= Afghanistan–Tajikistan border =

International border

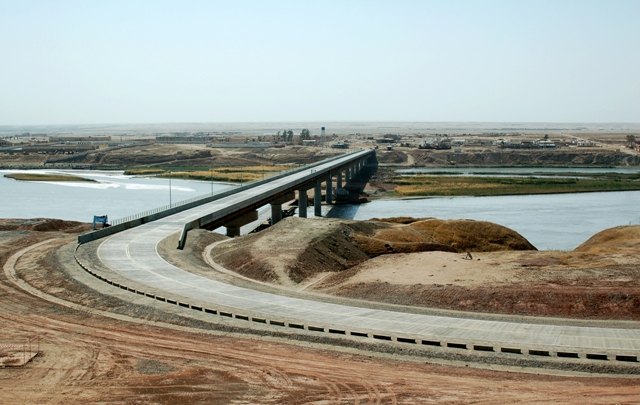
View of the bridge that connects Sher Khan Bandar in Afghanistan with Panji Poyon in Tajikistan

The Afghanistan–Tajikistan border is 1,357 km (843 mi) in length and runs from the tripoint with Uzbekistan in the west to the tripoint with the Xinjiang region of China in the east, almost entirely along the Amu Darya, Pyanj and Pamir Rivers, except for the easternmost section along the Wakhan Corridor and divides the ethnic Tajik community into citizens of two countries. The border was largely drawn in the late 19th century by the British and Russian empires during the Great Game, with Afghanistan left as a buffer state between them, and was later inherited by Tajikistan after the dissolution of the Soviet Union. When the border was established, the territory of present-day Tajikistan was under Russian control, while Afghanistan was under British influence.

The border area became highly volatile during the 1990s as a result of the Tajikistani Civil War and the Afghan Civil War, with insecurity on both sides contributing to cross-border instability. Security improved after the fall of the Taliban government in Afghanistan in 2001, but the frontier remained porous and weakly policed. Following the Taliban's return to power in 2021, the frontier has seen increased militarization, militant infiltration concerns, and repeated cross-border security incidents.

== Description ==
The border begins in the west at the tripoint with Uzbekistan on the Amu Darya. It continues along the thalweg of this river, which flows in a broadly eastwards direction, until it reaches the junction with the Vakhsh River. Hereafter the boundary continues along Pyanj river for 1,080 km (670 mi), the surrounding area becoming increasingly mountainous as the river traces a huge horse-shoe shape, up to the confluence with the Pamir River near the Afghan village of Gaz Khun. The boundary follows the Pamir for 71 km (44 mi) eastwards as far as Lake Zorkul (Sir-i-kol). The boundary then goes overland for 218 km (135 mi) up to the Chinese tripoint, mainly following various mountain peaks and ridges. The border's eastern terminus is found at the Afghanistan-China-Tajikistan tripoint on Povalo-Shveikovskogo Peak (Chinese: 波万洛什维科夫斯基峰; pinyin: Bōwànluò Shíwéikēfūsījī Fēng) / Kokrash Kol Peak (Kekelaqukaole Peak; Chinese: 克克拉去考勒峰; pinyin: Kèkèlāqùkǎolè Fēng).

Much of the boundary is paralleled by Tajikistan's Pamir Highway.

== History ==
Afghan and Tajik boundary markers

The border was inherited from the old Soviet Union-Afghan border, which largely took its current shape during the 19th century Anglo-Russian rivalry in Central Asia, known as the Great Game. With the Russian Empire having conquered the Khanate of Khiva and the Emirate of Bukhara, and with the British Empire controlling the British Raj, the two powers agreed to leave Afghanistan as an independent buffer state between them.

In 1873, Britain and Russia agreed on a rough formulation of the border, with the Amu Darya declared to be the border going east from the vicinity of the village of Khwaja Salar to Lake Zorku, with the Wakhan Corridor to remain in Afghanistan. The western section of the border (i.e. the bulk of the modern Afghan-Turkmen boundary) was to be determined at a later date by a boundary commission.

Tensions mounted as the Russians expanded further into what is now Turkmenistan in the early 1880s, reaching a crisis with the Panjdeh incident (near Sandykachi in what is now Turkmenistan), an area claimed by Afghanistan. Discussions calmed the situation and a joint Anglo-Russian boundary commission demarcated the boundary as it is today over the period 1884–87. As the village of Khwaja Salar could no longer be identified it was agreed that the boundary should meet the Amu Darya in the vicinity of Khamiab, Afghanistan.

The easternmost section of the border (now forming part of the Afghan-Tajik boundary) was not finally delimited until 1893–95, with the Afghans agreeing to waive any claims to lands north of the Amu Darya. This agreement also stipulated the position of the land border in section east of Lake Zorkul up to China, with a series of boundary pillars subsequently erected.

In 1921, a Soviet-Afghan treaty was signed whereby Russia agreed "to hand over to Afghanistan the frontier districts which belonged to the latter in the last century, observing the principles of justice and self-determination of the population inhabiting the same." However, this treaty was never implemented, and was explicitly annulled by the Frontier Agreement of 1946, which kept the boundary as it was, with riverine islands to be subsequently allocated by a joint commission.

The border area was extremely volatile in the 1990s due to the Tajikistani Civil War and the Afghan Civil War. Security improved with the end of the Tajik war and the fall of the Taliban government in 2001; however the long, porous frontier remains poorly policed and is a major drug smuggling route. There have also been a number of incidents related to the Taliban insurgency in Afghanistan. Russia assisted with policing it before 2005, and China may now be assisting with border policing. Several new border crossing and bridges have built in recent years in an effort to boost trade and links, partly funded by foreign governments and the Aga Khan Development Network.

In July 2021, many Afghan troops and government employees crossed the border into Tajikistan after the 2021 Taliban offensive. In response, Tajikistan's government stationed extra troops near the border.

== Border crossings ==
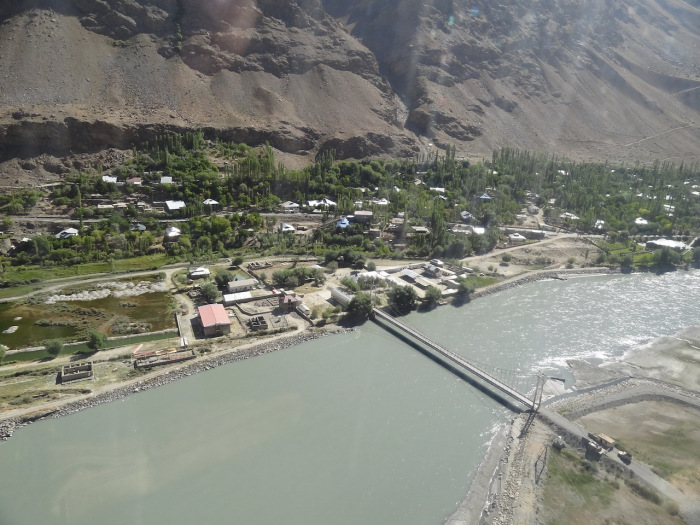
The Tajik–Afghan bridge at Tem-Demogan in 2014

Border crossings are listed West to East:

Afghan name	Tajik name	Type of crossing	location
Sher Khan Bandar	Panji Poyon	road (Tajik–Afghan bridge at Panji Poyon)	37°11′38.0″N 68°36′13.4″E
Ai Khanoum	Kakool	ferry only	37°11′43.96″N 69°25′24.58″E
Khwahan	Shohon	road	37°56′19.3″N 70°13′45.6″E
Nusay	Ruzvat	road (Tajik-Afghan Friendship Bridge)	37°13′44.9″N 67°25′39.6″E
Jamarj-e Bala	Vahdat	road (Vanj bridge)	38°16′19.3″N 71°20′18.3″E
Shighnan	Khorog	road (Tajik–Afghan bridge at Tem-Demogan)	37°31′41.0″N 71°30′13.0″E
Ishkashim	Ishkoshim	road	36°44′51.3″N 71°34′40.1″E
Langar	Dehaqan Khana	road (Langar bridge)	37°3′45.2″N 72°41′44.1″E

== Settlements near the border ==
=== Afghanistan ===
- Baghri Kol
- Kolukh Teppe
- Sher Khan Bandar
- Shah Ravan
- Chichkeh
- Dasht-e-Qaleh
- Kvahan
- Khosfav
- Arakhat
- Ishkashim

=== Tajikistan ===
- Ayvadzh
- Panji Poyon
- Dusty
- Panj
- Farkhor
- Kishti Royen
- Qal'ai Khumb
- Kevron
- Rushon
- Bazhdu Pavdiv
- Khorugh
- Ishkoshim
- Sinib

== History maps ==
Historical English-language maps of the Afghanistan-Tajik SSR border, mid to late 20th century:

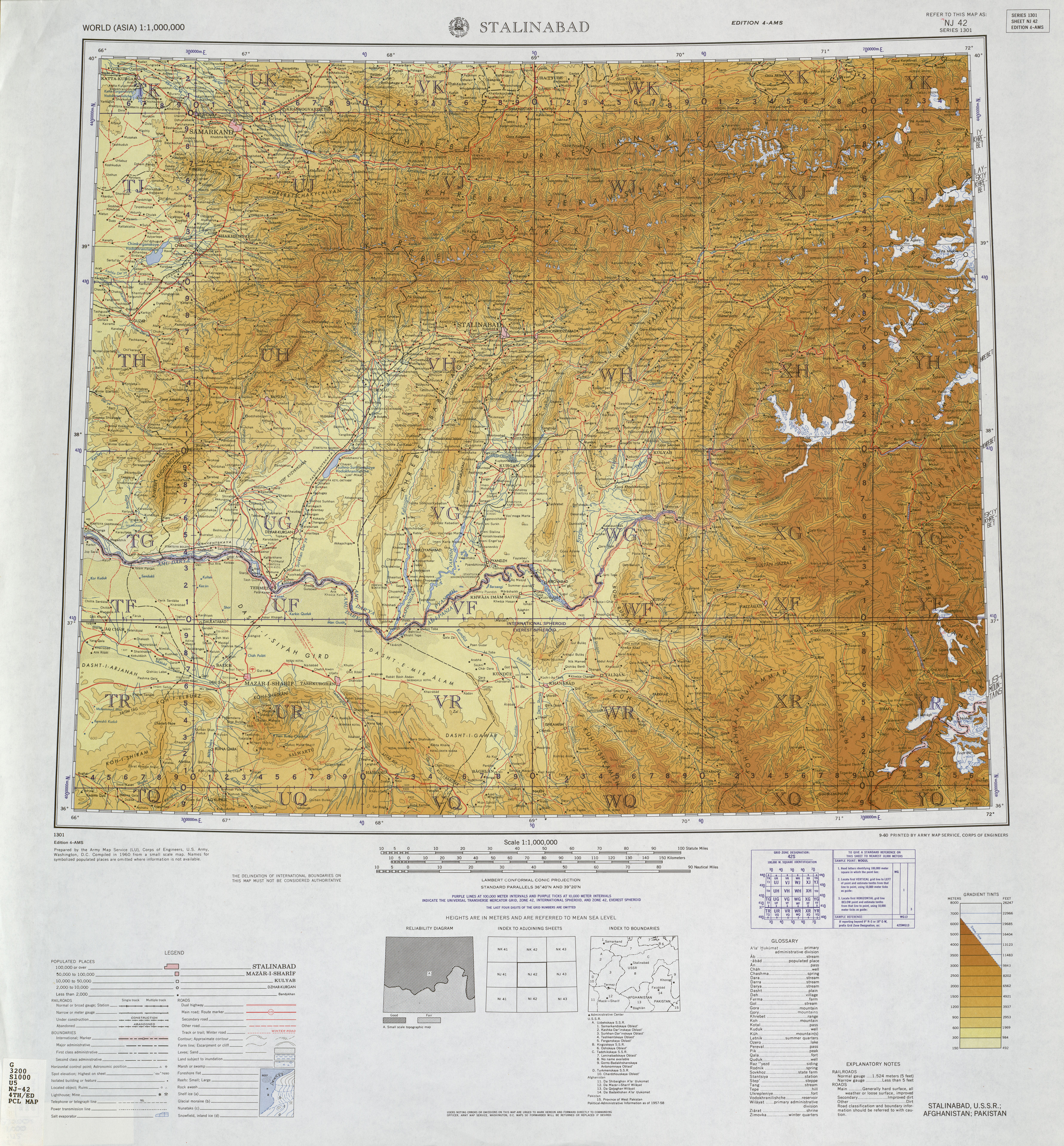

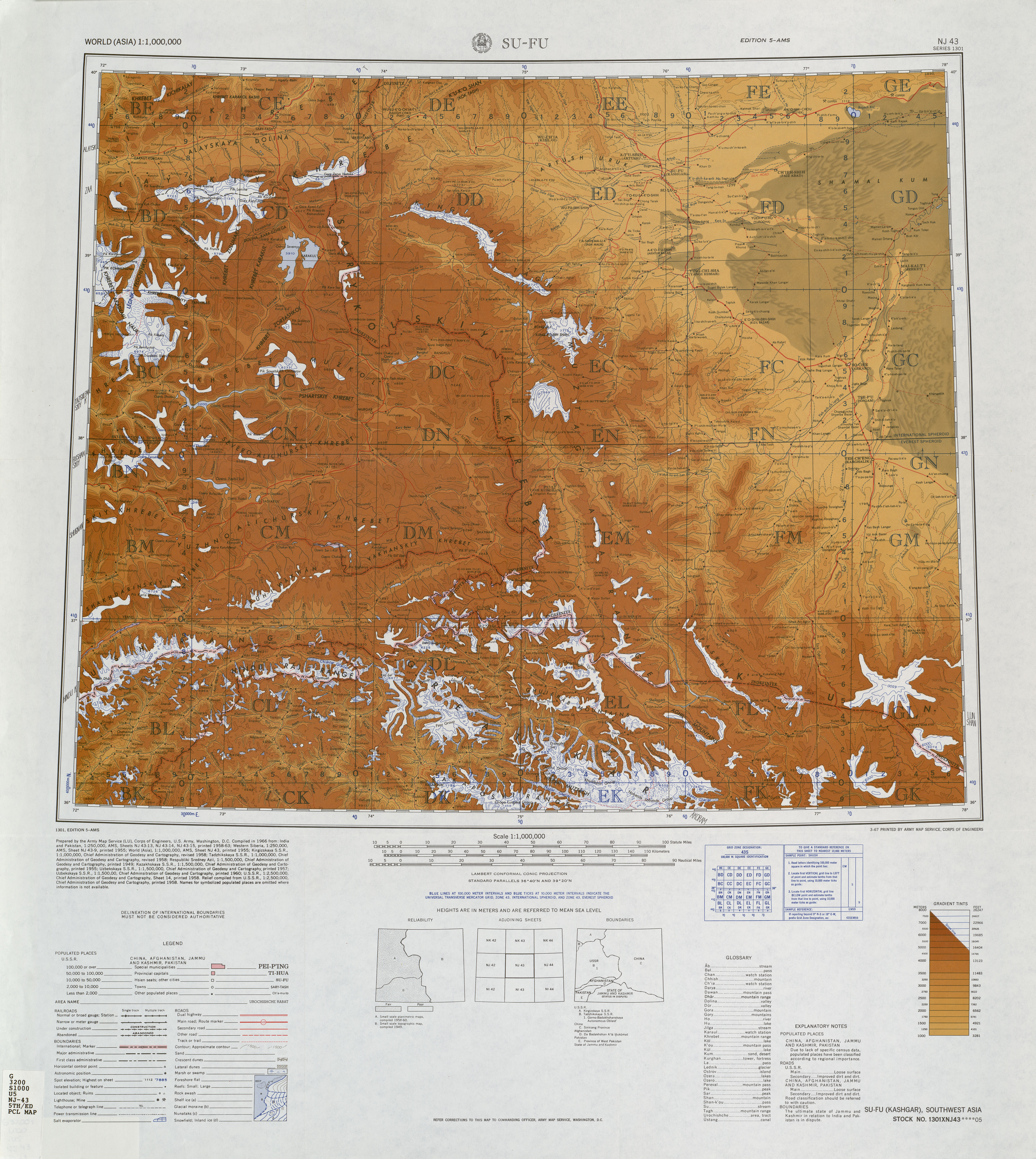

== See also ==
- Afghanistan–Tajikistan relations
- Afghanistan–Tajikistan border skirmishes
- Extreme points of Afghanistan
- Extreme points of Tajikistan
- Sarikol Range
