= List of bridges in Afghanistan =

== Historical and architectural interest bridges ==
	Name	Persian	Distinction	Length	Type	Carries Crosses	Opened	Location	Region	Ref.
1	Malan Bridge	پل مالان		230 m (750 ft)	Masonry; 22 arches	Road bridge Hari	1010	Herat; 34°17′10.1″N 62°11′28.7″E	Herat Province	

== Major road and railway bridges ==
This table presents the structures with spans greater than 100 meters (non-exhaustive list).

	Name	Span	Length	Type	Carries Crosses	Opened	Location	Region	Ref.
1	Kelif Pipeline Bridge	660 m (2,170 ft)	660 m (2,170 ft)	Suspension; Steel	Pipeline; Amu Darya	1975	Keleft - Kelif; 37°20′42.4″N 66°15′38.1″E	Balkh; Turkmenistan	
2	Tajik–Afghan bridge at Tem-Demogan	135 m (443 ft)		Suspension; Steel truss deck, steel pylons	Road bridge Panj River	2002	Shighnan District - Khorugh; 37°31′41.0″N 71°30′13.0″E	Badakhshan; Tajikistan	
3	Afghanistan–Uzbekistan Friendship Bridge		816 m (2,677 ft)	Truss; Steel	Road-rail bridge Amu Darya	1982	Hairatan - Termez; 37°13′44.9″N 67°25′39.6″E	Balkh; Uzbekistan	
4	Tajik–Afghan bridge at Vanj-Jamarj-e Bala		216 m (709 ft)	Suspension; Steel truss deck, steel pylons	Road bridge Panj River	2011	Jamarj-e Bala - Vanj District; 38°16′19.3″N 71°20′18.3″E	Badakhshan; Tajikistan	
5	Tajik–Afghan Friendship Bridge			Suspension; Steel	Road bridge Panj River	2004	Nusay - Ruzvat; 38°27′11.5″N 70°49′37.7″E	Badakhshan; Tajikistan	
6	Shurabad cross-border Bridge			Suspension; Steel truss deck, steel pylons	Road bridge Panj River		Khwahan District - Shohon; 37°56′17.2″N 70°13′46.4″E	Badakhshan; Tajikistan	

== Alphabetical list ==
- Afghanistan-Iran Bridge in Zaranj, Nimroz Province
- Afghanistan-Tajikistan Bridge at Sher Khan Bandar in Kunduz Province
- Afghanistan–Uzbekistan Friendship Bridge at Hairatan in Balkh Province
- Bar Shultan Bridge ( Kunar Province)
- Behsud Bridge in Jalalabad, Nangarhar Province
- Guryak Truck Bridge in Kunar Province
- Kandahar-Helmand Bridge (Bagh-e Pul), Kandahar Province
- Kandahar-Urozgan Bridge in Kandahar Province
- Khan Kunar Bridge ( Kunar province)
- Lal Pur Bridge in Jalalabad, Nangarhar Province
- Malan Bridge (Pul-e Malan) in Herat, Herat Province
- Pashad Bridge in Kunar Province
- Saw Bridge in Kunar Province

== See also ==
- Transport in Afghanistan
- Rail transport in Afghanistan
- Geography of Afghanistan
- List of bridges in Konar Province

== Notes and references ==
- Notes
- Nicolas Janberg. "International Database for Civil and Structural Engineering". Structurae.com.
- Others references
