= Afghanistan–Tajikistan border skirmishes =

Series of border incidents between Afghanistan and Tajikistan

- Part of Afghan conflict and conflicts in territory of the former Soviet Union
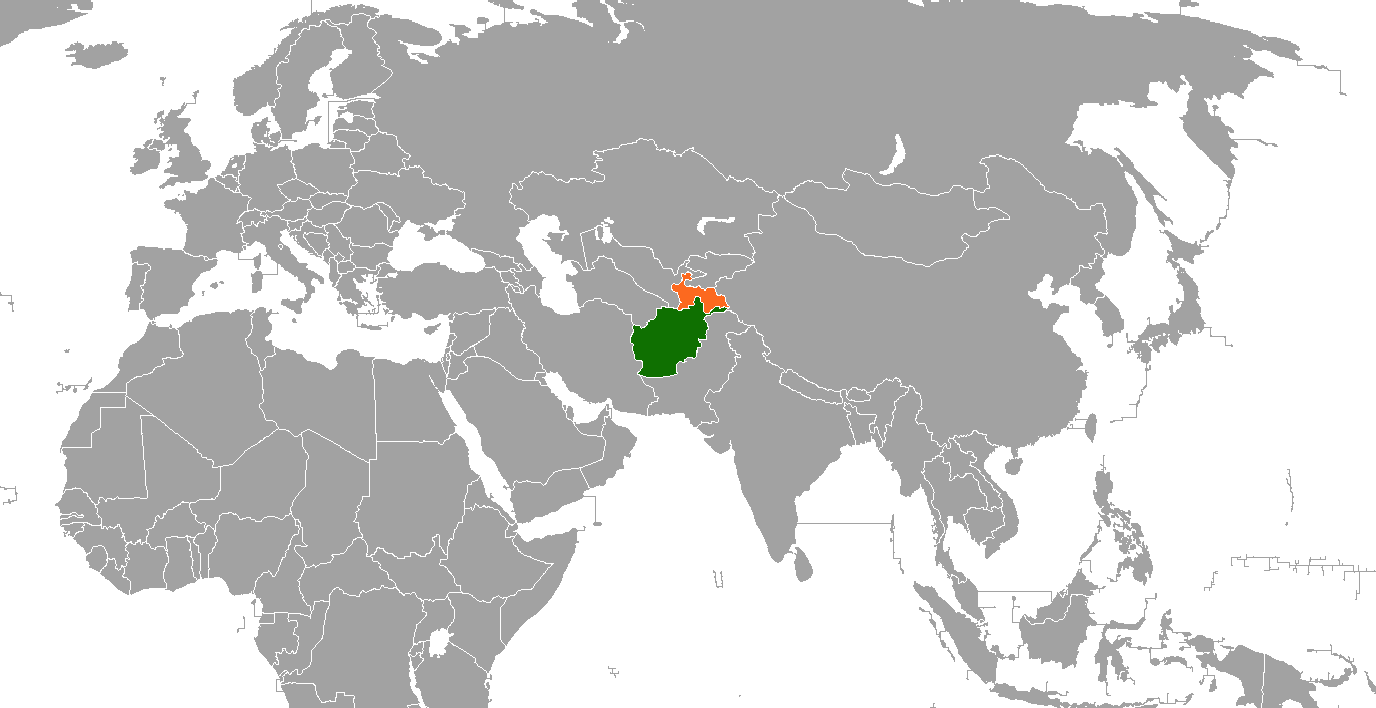
- Map showing the location of Afghanistan and Tajikistan along their shared border
Date	2022–present
Location	Afghanistan–Tajikistan border 38°N 71°E
Status	Ongoing

Belligerents
Afghanistan; Jamaat Ansarullah; Other anti-Tajikistan militants	Tajikistan

Commanders and leaders
Hibatullah Akhundzada; Sirajuddin Haqqani; Mullah Yaqoob; Fasihuddin Fitrat; Muhammad Sharifov (Mahdi Arsalan)	(Tajikistan) Emomali Rahmon (Tajikistan) Ramazon Rahimov (Tajikistan) Emomali Sobirzoda (Tajikistan) Bobojon Saidzoda

Units involved
Afghan Armed Forces; Ansar Unit	(Tajikistan) Tajikistani Armed Forces; Ground Forces; Mobile Forces; Border Troops; National Guard; Internal Troops

Strength
4,000 fighters 200+ fighters	(Tajikistan) 20,000 soldiers

Casualties and losses
Per Afghanistan: 1 Afghan fighter killed 4 Afghan fighters injured Per Tajikistan: 15 militants killed (Note: 2 killed on 26 April 2023, 3 killed on 6 September 2023, 3 killed on 25 December 2025, 4 killed on 19 January 2026.)	Per Tajikistan: 4+ soldiers killed
- 9 Chinese civilians killed, 7+ Chinese civilians wounded in Tajikistan (2024–2026) (Note: 1 killed, 5 injured in November 2024. 3 killed on 26 November 2025. 5 killed, 5 injured on 27 November 2025.)

A series of occasional skirmishes have occurred along the Afghanistan–Tajikistan border between the Taliban-led Afghan Armed Forces and Tajikistani Border Troops. The Taliban’s return to power in Afghanistan led to a deterioration in relations between the two countries. Tajikistani president Emomali Rahmon has vowed not to recognize the Taliban-led government and has criticized the group for neglecting the rights of ethnic Tajiks in Afghanistan. The Afghan Taliban, in turn, has warned Tajikistan against interfering in Afghanistan’s internal affairs. Tajikistan also accuses the Afghan Taliban of sheltering anti-Tajikistan militants, while the Taliban, in turn, accuses Tajikistan of training anti-Taliban groups.

Security concerns for Tajikistani authorities along the Afghanistan-Tajikistan border have intensified since the Taliban's return to power. In response, Tajikistan has accelerated border fortification and increased number of troops deployed to reinforce its border defense. It has established at least 172 border security outposts and support bases along its border with Afghanistan, many of them after the Taliban takeover in 2021. Afghanistan, in turn, has also deployed additional troops along the border.

== Background ==
Relations between Tajikistan and the Taliban-led Afghanistan have long been marked by ideological hostility and mutual suspicion. During the 1990s, Tajikistan aligned with the anti-Taliban Northern Alliance, and after the Taliban returned to power in August 2021, it remained the only neighboring state to refuse hand over of Afghan Embassy to the new Afghan government. Tajikistan is widely regarded as the Taliban’s strongest critic in Central Asia, with President Emomali Rahmon describing the Taliban’s Islamic Emirate as having been formed through oppression. Rahmon also insisted on the establishment of an inclusive government in Afghanistan representing all ethnic and political groups, particularly Tajiks and other minorities, and accused the Taliban of persecuting minorities, especially Tajiks, Uzbeks, and other non-Pashtun communities. The Taliban, in turn, warned Tajikistan against interfering in Afghanistan’s internal affairs.

Security concerns were further heightened by the presence in Afghanistan of Jamaat Ansarullah, a Tajik militant group that seeks to overthrow the government of Tajikistan. The group has operated in northern Afghanistan since the mid-2000s and has reportedly maintained ties with the Taliban and other regional militant networks. During the Taliban’s 2021 offensive, commander Muhammad Shafirov was reportedly placed in charge of security in several districts of Afghanistan’s Badakhshan Province near the Tajik border, reinforcing fears in Tajikistan about cross-border militancy and infiltration.

== Timeline ==
=== 2021 ===
On 4 October, the Taliban reportedly supplied Tajik militants based near the Tajikistan border with new United States-made military vehicles, weapons, and equipment, as tensions and military deployments increased on both sides of the frontier. According to Tajik and Afghan security sources, the militants, identified as members of Jamaat Ansarullah, were among at least 200 Tajik fighters present in northern Afghanistan. The reported buildup came amid worsening Taliban-led Afghanistan-Tajikistan relations, with Tajikistan warning against threats to ethnic Tajiks and other minorities and the Taliban accusing Tajikistan of interference. During the same month, amid rising tensions with Tajikistan, Taliban authorities announced the deployment of 3,000 suicide bombers to the border between the two countries.

=== 2022 ===
On 15 May, a four-hour clash occurred between Taliban forces and Tajikistani border guards near the Panji Poyon–Sher Khan Bandar border crossing. The skirmish reportedly began after a verbal altercation, with both sides using light and heavy weapons. Fighting ended following negotiations, and neither Tajikistan nor Taliban officials commented; it was the first reported clash at this crossing since the Taliban’s return to power.

=== 2023 ===
On 26 April, Tajikstani authorities stated that two members of international terrorist organisations were killed in an anti-terror operation in Vanj district, Gorno-Badakhshan, near the Afghanistan-Tajikistan border. Authorities said the two had crossed into Tajikistan illegally with the intention of carrying out a terrorist attack, and that weapons, explosives, grenades, ammunition, communication devices, and mobile phones were recovered at the scene.

On 6 September, Tajikistani authorities reported that three militants from Jamaat Ansarullah were killed after crossing the Afghanistan-Tajikistan border and entering Darvoz district in Tajikistan. According to Tajikistan, the recent cross-border incursion from the Afghan side was carried out solely by Jamaat Ansarullah and the Taliban’s intelligence services. Shortly after the armed incursion, Jamaat Ansarullah released a video threatening Tajikistan and calling on Tajik nationals to rise up against the country’s government.

On 19 October, Tajikistan established 24 new outposts along its border with Afghanistan. Earlier, President Emomali Rahmon said that Tajikistan needed hundreds of security installations along the border because of threats originating from Afghanistan. Tajikistani authorities have also repeatedly urged Central Asian countries to create a "security belt" around Afghanistan.

=== 2024 ===
On the night of 17-18 November, one Chinese national was killed and five others were injured in a cross-border attack in the Zarbuz Gorge of Tajikistan's Shamsiddin Shohin district, near the Tajikistan-Afghanistan border. The injured included four Chinese nationals and one Tajik national.

=== 2025 ===
On 13 February, Jamaat Ansarullah established a unit known as "Ansar" in Imam Sahib District, Kunduz province, near the Tajikistan border. The unit is tasked with infiltrating border areas, apparently referring to Tajikistan. Jamaat Ansarullah is also operating training camps in Afghanistan’s Khost province with support from al-Qaeda-linked instructors, as well as a military training centre in Kalafgan district, Takhar province, for Central Asian and Arab fighters.

On 13 March, Maulvi Amanuddin Mansoor, a senior Taliban commander, said that he and his forces could capture Tajikistan if authorized to do so.

On 24 August, a border clash occurred between Taliban fighters and Tajikistani border guards in Dovang district, Badakhshan province, near Tajikistan’s Shamsiddin Shohin District. One Taliban fighter was killed and four injured, with heavy weapons reportedly used amid disputes over Chinese mining operations and the Panj River. Following the skirmish, representatives from both sides met for talks, while neither Tajikistani nor Taliban officials issued an official statement.

On 26 October, a border clash occurred between Tajikistani border guards and Taliban forces near Tajikistan's Shamsiddin Shohin district and Afghanistan's Shahri Buzurg district, close to a gold mining area. The confrontation reportedly stemmed from shifts in the Amu River’s course, though casualty figures remain unconfirmed. Following the skirmish, both sides held talks to de-escalate tensions.

On 26 November, three Chinese Nationals were killed and one other was wounded in a drone strike on Tajikistan side of the border. According to the Tajikistani authorities, the drone strike was carried out by criminal groups based in Afghanistan. Tajikistani authorities also urged Afghanistan to stabilise and secure their side of the border. Following the drone strike, Chinese authorities urged its citizens to leave Afghanistan-Tajikistan border area.

On 30 November, Tajikistani authorities reported that two Chinese nationals were killed and two others were wounded in cross-border fire carried out by militants operating from an Afghan village of Ruzvayak, in the Mohi Mai district of Badakhshan province. Tajikistani authorities condemned the cross-border attack and called on Taliban authorities to take timely effective measures to reduce such incidents.

On 24 December, Tajikistan's president inaugurated four new military outposts and a tank training ground along the Afghanistan-Tajikistan border. According to Tajikistani authorities, over the past two to three years, the country has set up 80 new border outposts along the Afghanistan-Tajikistan border.

On 10 December, The Collective Security Treaty Organization (CSTO) has approved the delivery of military equipment to Tajikistan to strengthen security along its border with Afghanistan. Russia, Belarus, and Kazakhstan are expected to provide the equipment, while financial arrangements and contracts are being finalized. The deliveries are part of a five-year border-reinforcement programme approved in 2024, whose first phase began in 2025.

On 25 December, Tajikistani authorities stated that they had foiled an infiltration attempt from Afghanistan into Khatlon province in southern Tajikistan, which resulted in the deaths of three militants and two Tajikistani border guards. Tajikistani authorities criticized the Taliban for not fulfilling their international obligations to stop cross-border attacks. They urged the Taliban leadership to apologize to the people of Tajikistan and take meaningful steps to ensure the security of the shared border.

A total of 17 armed clashes were reported along the Tajikistan-Afghanistan border in 2025.

=== 2026 ===
On 19 January, officials in Tajikistan said that Tajik border guards had killed four militants who had crossed from Afghanistan into the Khatlon Region of Tajikistan.

On 30 January, Tajik border guards clashed with five armed individuals who had crossed from Afghanistan into the Shamsiddin Shohin area of Tajikistan, killing three, while the other two fled, according to Tajikistan officials.

== See also ==
- Afghanistan–Tajikistan relations
- Jamaat Ansarullah
