= Afghanistan-Tajikistan Bridge =

Afghanistan-Tajikistan Bridge or Tajikistan-Afghanistan Bridge or similar may refer to:

- Tajik–Afghan bridge at Panji Poyon
- Tajik–Afghan Friendship Bridge
- Tajik–Afghan bridge at Tem-Demogan (2002)
