= Tajikistan Jamaat Ansarullah =

Tajikistani jihadist militant organization

- تاجکستان جماعت انصارالله (Persian); Тоҷикистон Ҷамоати Ансоруллоҳ (Tajik)
- Flag used by the Tajikistan Jamaat Ansarullah
- Leaders: Amriddin Tobarov † (2006–2015); Mahdi Arsalan (2015–present)
- Dates active: 2006–present
- Allegiance: Islamic Emirate of Afghanistan
- Headquarters: Badakhshan, Afghanistan
- Active regions: Badghis: Jawand; Ab Kamari; Badakhshan: Kuf Ab; Khwahan; Maimay; Darwaz-e Bala; Shekay
- Ideology: Islamic fundamentalism Jihadism; Islamic nationalism Tajik nationalism Anti-communism
- Size: ~100
- Part of: Islamic Movement of Uzbekistan (2006–2019)
- Wars: War in Afghanistan

The Tajikistan Jamaat Ansarullah (TJA), (Note: Tajik: Тоҷикистон Ҷамоати Ансоруллоҳ, Persian: تاجکستان جماعت انصارالله lit. 'Society of the Supporters of God') also known as the Tajikistani Taliban, (Note: Tajik: Толибони Тоҷикистон, Persian: طالبان تاجکستان lit. 'Tajikistani Taliban') is a Islamist jihadist militant organization that primarily operates along the Afghanistan–Tajikistan border. Its stated aim is to overthrow the Republic of Tajikistan under President Emomali Rahmon and establish an Islamic emirate there.

The TJA was founded in 2006 and consisted of dissident Islamist factions of the United Tajik Opposition who were opposed to the 1997 armistice that ended the Tajikistani Civil War (1992–1997). The TJA publicized its presence in 2010 by claiming responsibility for the Khujund police station bombing.

As of July 2021, members of the organization has served as the Islamic Emirate of Afghanistan’s partial border security for the Afghanistan–Tajikistan border. The group has also been a flashpoint of deterioration in Afghanistan–Tajikistan relations under the Taliban regime. The group's current leader Mahdi Arsalan is believed to be in northern Afghanistan. In 2025, a United Nations report said that the TJA have established a number of training camps in northern Afghanistan with the support of the Taliban. In February 2026, it was reported that the TJA has escalated attacks in the Afghanistan–Tajikistan border region.

== History ==
Tajikistan Jamaat Ansarullah was founded by Amriddin Tobarov in 2006. Tobarov was a former field commander of the Islamist faction within the United Tajik Opposition. The organization's original members were former UTO members who refused to accept the 1997 armistice that ended the Tajikistani Civil War.

The group first publicized its presence in 2010 by claiming responsibility for the September 3 car bombing of a police station in Khujand that killed three and injured 25. According to the Tajikistani government, Tajikistan Jamaat Ansarullah was also linked to insurgents fighting in the Rasht District that have since been suppressed.

In 2015, the Police of Tajikistan arrested 10 men residing in Isfara between the ages of 30 and 38 on suspicion of joining Tajikistan Jamaat Ansarullah. The men were found guilty by the Sughd Regional Court and sentenced to eight-and-a-half years in jail. Earlier that year, the Sughd Regional Court's branch in Istaravshan sentenced 13 men to lengthy prison sentences for being group members. In March, the same court sentenced a man to nine years in prison for being a member of the group.

Tobarov, the group's leader, was killed by Afghan security forces during a combat operation on 27 January 2016. Mahdi Arsalan succeed him shortly after.

Tajikistan Jamaat Ansarullah also caught the attention of the Afghan government in November 2020, when social media was posted of its fighters brutally killing Afghan National Army officers in uniform. The video itself purportedly showed the fall of the Maimay district to the Taliban.

=== Under the Taliban (2021–present) ===
In July 2021, the organization's Afghan-based fighters were entrusted by the Taliban with security of Northern Badakhshan. After the fall of Kabul on August 15, 2021, Tajikistani officials were reviewing reports of Jamaat Asadullah planning to infiltrate Tajikistan. During this time, Tajikistani president Emomali Rahmon, deployed 20,000 soldiers of the Tajikistani Ground Forces to the Afghan–Tajikistani border.

In July 2022, Tajikistani security forces noticed a guard tower that was built with assistance from the Taliban across from the Darvoz district. The group's name was also tagged on a rock on the base of the guard tower, being meant as a threat to Tajikistani authorities. According to an official from the Tajikistani Border Troops, members of the group walk demonstratively along the Panj everyday, or drive their cars in the area to verbally harass them via loudspeaker.

In September 2022, Shapirov was reported to have been killed in Kabul. However another source claimed that he might be alive.

On April 26, 2023, the State Committee for National Security counter-terrorism forces killed three fighters of Tajikistan Jamaat Ansarullah in the village of Dashti Yazoglum. Both men intended to internally destabilize Tajikistan.

Another incident occurred on September 6, 2023, the State Committee for National Security counter-terrorism unit killed three fighters of Tajikistan Jamaat Ansarullah. The clash occurred in the Darvoz district after the latter refused to surrender. According to state media outlet Khovar, the men were intended to carry out "terrorist acts." The unit also seized night-vision devices, M16 rifles, and M15 pistols smuggled from Afghanistan.

In late 2023, representatives from Tajikistan and the Islamic Emirate of Afghanistan were negotiating the status of Tajikistan Jamaat Ansarullah in the latter's territory. The Tajikistani government reportedly wanted the members of the group extradited while the Afghan government offered to mediate between both groups instead. The leadership of Tajikistan Jamaat Ansarullah said they would only negotiate with the Tajikistani government if the latter agreed to several conditions including expelling the Russian 201st Guards Military Base and declaring an Islamic state. Tajikistan rejected both, amongst other conditions.

As of August 2023, border guards of the Islamic Emirate of Afghanistan and several other sources close to Tajikistan Jamaat Ansarullah confirmed that the group was no longer present in the districts they were initially given security for. They explained that members of TJA have relocated elsewhere within Badakhshan Province. In June 2023, much of its members again relocated to Kunduz Province.

On 25 December 2025 at least three Tajikistan Jamaat Ansarullah members tried to infiltrate into Tajikistan and attempted to smuggle homemade explosives. Tajikistani officials said clashes between border guards and the armed men left three militants and two Tajikistani security personnel dead. Earlier in the month at least 5 Chinese contractors in Tajikistan were killed by drone attacks from Tajikistan Jamaat Ansarullah & Turkistan Islamic Party, both parties being based in Badakhshan Province of Afghanistan.

UN estimates there to be around 400 Tajikistani nationals in Afghanistan being associated with Tajikistan Jamaat Ansarullah in 2025. It was also reported that Afghan Taliban absorbed many fighters of the TJA and other militant groups into its security ranks.

== Membership ==
Tajikistan Jamaat Ansarullah is reported to have between 100–500 fighters within Afghanistan. Much of its original membership were fighters and supporters loyal to Tabarov who rejected the 1997 armistice ending the Tajikistani Civil War. The current and second generation of membership are the children and relatives of the above. A majority of them are Tajikistani citizens coming from the ethnic Tajik regions of Sughd, Khatlon, and Rasht Valley.

In 2017, the Singapore-based International Centre for Political Violence and Terrorism Research reported that the group had less than 100 fighters, and thus didn't have the manpower to overthrow the Tajikistani government. However, an officer from the Tajikistani Border Patrol said in an interview to Radio Free Europe/Radio Liberty that the group's current leader, Muhammad Sharifov, "introduced" 200 members to Afghanistan in July 2021. Despite its current size, the organization also works to recruit members from Afghanistan, Pakistan, Central Asia, and Russia.

== Ideology and aims ==
Jamaat Ansarullah is ideologically Islamic fundamentalist and jihadist, aligned with the Islamic Movement of the Taliban and al-Qaeda, with the majority of its fighters from the regions of Sughd, Khatlon, and the Rasht Valley. They have also expressed admiration for the anti-Shia group Jaysh al-Adl in Iran. However, the group is ostensibly nationalist with its aims to limited to Tajikistan as opposed to establishing a worldwide caliphate.

Their main goal is to overthrow the Republic of Tajikistan under Emomali Rahmon and replace it with an Islamic emirate. In September 2011, the group has called on Tajiks to overthrow the current government, referring to them as a taghut. On Telegram channels, supporters of the group have portrayed and ridiculed Rahmon as an idolater protected by a servile security apparatus, and the titles he holds, saying they were concocted by "palace psychopaths". In its propaganda, Tajikistan Jamaat Ansarullah portrays Rahmon as a personal enemy who "has been waging a bloody war against the believers of Allah for the last two decades".

In September 2011, the organization issued several videos calling on Tajikistani citizens to embrace jihad against infidels and take action supporting the implementation of sharia nationwide. A man in one of the videos claims "Those who pray namaz, who follow fasting rules but support democracy are nonbelievers…Allah is killing nonbelievers by our hands and, thus, blesses us".
