= Extreme points of Afghanistan =

This is a list of the extreme points of Afghanistan.

Extreme points of Afghanistan (approximate)

== Cardinal directions ==
Heading	Location	Administrative entity	Bordering entity/entities	Coordinates (Note: Coordinates obtained from Google Earth. Google Earth makes use of the WGS84 geodetic reference system.)
North	in the Panj River on the Afghanistan-Tajikistan border	Maimay District (formerly part of Darwaz District), Badakhshan Province, Afghanistan	Darvoz District, Gorno-Badakhshan Autonomous Region, Tajikistan	38.49091037795163°N 70.98910900954883°E
South	on the Afghanistan-Pakistan border	Afghanistan	Pakistan	29.377053840714115°N 64.11498849911357°E
East	Afghanistan-China-Tajikistan tripoint on Povalo-Shveikovskogo Peak (Chinese: 波万洛什维科夫斯基峰; pinyin: Bōwànluò Shíwéikēfūsījī Fēng) / Kokrash Kol Peak (Kekelaqukaole Peak; Chinese: 克克拉去考勒峰; pinyin: Kèkèlāqùkǎolè Fēng)	Wakhan District, Badakhshan Province, Afghanistan	Taxkorgan Tajik Autonomous County, Kashgar Prefecture, Xinjiang Uygur Autonomous Region, China and Murghob District, Gorno-Badakhshan Autonomous Region, Tajikistan	37.23531938299142°N 74.89018923839505°E
West	on the Afghanistan-Iran border	Afghanistan	Iran	33.12961099465783°N 60.582111332020865°E

== Elevation ==
Noshaq (7492 m above sea level) is the highest point in Afghanistan.

Lowest point in Afghanistan (about 255 m above sea level): The area in the northern end of Khamyab District where the Amu Darya flows into Turkmenistan.

== See also ==
- Geography of Afghanistan
- Extreme points of Asia
