= Afghanistan–Tajikistan relations =

- Afghanistan: Tajikistan

Afghanistan and Tajikistan established diplomatic relations in 1992 after the dissolution of the Soviet Union. However, relations remained highly hostile as the Islamic State of Afghanistan supported the United Tajik Opposition against the forces of the Tajikistani government under Rahmon Nabiyev and Emomali Rahmon during the Tajikistani Civil War (1992–1997). Following the overthrow of the Taliban in 2001, Tajikistan opened its embassy in Kabul when the Karzai administration took control of Afghanistan. Ties were cooled down during this era; both countries initiated economic trade and started CASA-1000 infrastructure project.

Following the Taliban takeover of Afghanistan in 2021, Tajikistan remained largely hostile to the Taliban (whom it declares a terrorist organization) and have been alleged to have provided aid to the anti-Taliban National Resistance Front (NRF) led by Ahmad Massoud while the Taliban government in Afghanistan has also been accused of providing support to the Islamist militia Jamaat Ansarullah against Tajikistan. Since 2022, both countries have also engaged in a number of border clashes.

== History ==
The areas which form the two countries were once connected, especially during the Samanid, Ghaznavid, Timurid and Durrani periods. After the 1895 Pamir Boundary Commission protocols were signed between Russia and Britain, the Amu River became the border of Afghanistan. Persian language is widely used in both countries, and there are slightly more ethnic Tajiks in Afghanistan than in Tajikistan. The citizens of both countries are usually friendly and respectful toward each other.

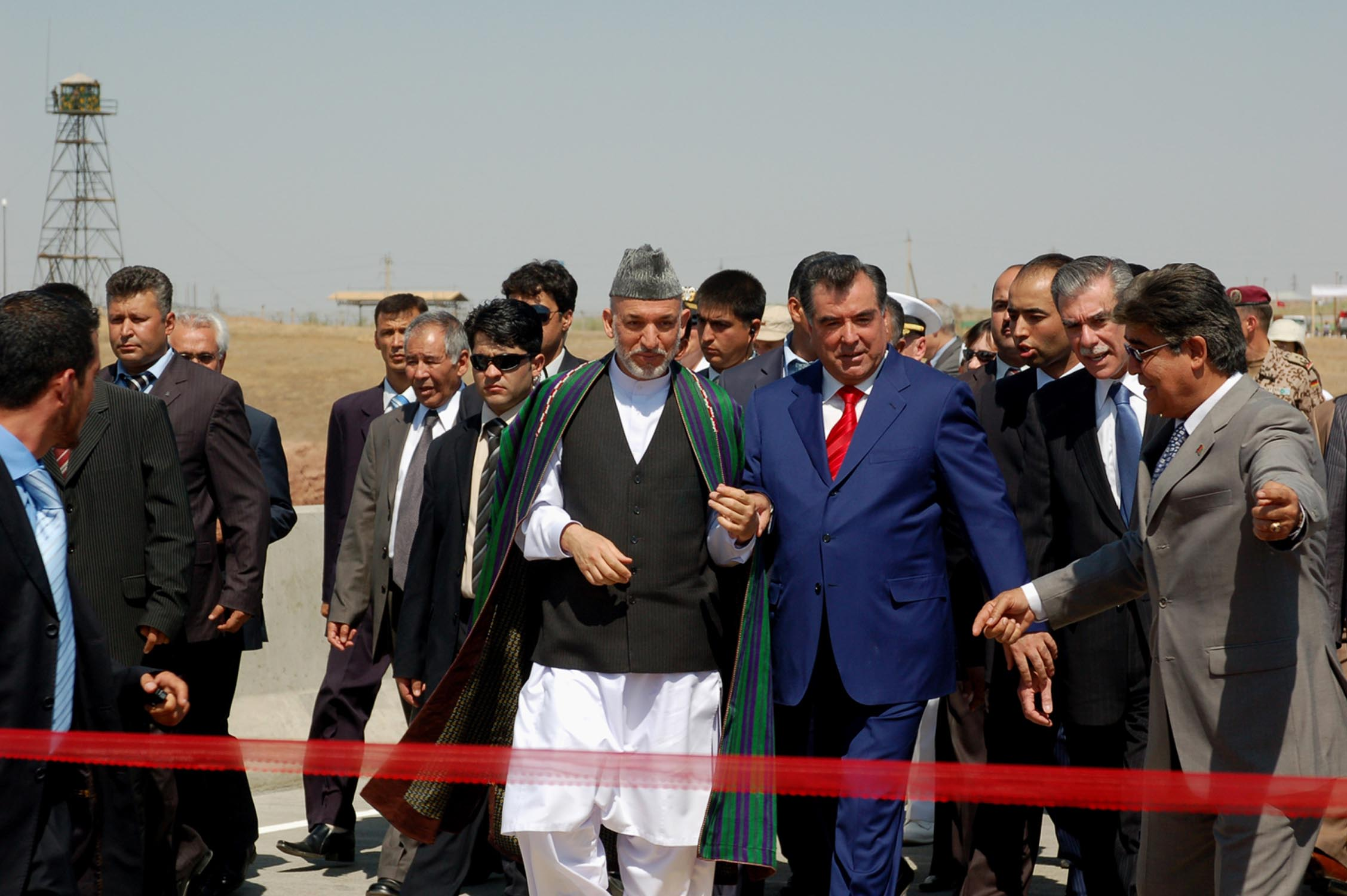
Afghan President Hamid Karzai and Tajik President Emomali Rahmonov, with Carlos M. Gutierrez (U.S. Secretary of Commerce) at the Afghan-Tajik bridge opening in 2007.

Diplomatic relations between the two countries were officially established on June 15, 1992. The outbreak of the Tajikistani Civil War complicated matters as most of Tajikistan's southern border region (Khatlon and Gorno-Badakhshan) was contested between Tajik government forces (and allied Russian border guards) and the United Tajik Opposition, which was supported by forces of the Islamic State of Afghanistan. During 1992, at least 80,000 citizens of Tajikistan sought refuge in Afghanistan. The Tajik opposition leaders enjoyed the support of the Afghan government and based themselves there, mainly in Badakhshan Province. The civil war in Afghanistan had likewise caused refugee migration between the two countries, this time citizens of Afghanistan fleeing to Tajikistan as refugees and asylum seekers.

Tajikistan opened its embassy in Kabul when the Karzai administration took control of Afghanistan. The consulate in Mazar-i-Sharif was also opened around that time. Afghanistan maintains an embassy in Dushanbe and a consulate in Khorog.

Presidents Emomalii Rahmon of Tajikistan and Hamid Karzai of Afghanistan met on the sidelines of the 2004 Economic Cooperation Organization summit held in Dushanbe. In April 2005 Rahmon made an official visit to Afghanistan. Diplomatic, business and cultural ties between the two countries have been gradually expanding since then. There are an estimated 13,600 Afghans in Tajikistan. About 500 are studying in different universities in Tajikistan.

=== Islamic Emirate (2021–present) ===
Following the Taliban takeover in 2021, Tajikistani president Emomali Rahmon refused to recognize an "oppressive" government in Afghanistan. Rahmon also condemned the Islamic Emirate for failing to form an inclusive government, to which Taliban officials responded by warning Tajikistan to not interfere in Afghanistan's internal affairs. Tajikistani government also labels the Taliban as a terrorist organization. The Taliban has also been accused of supporting Jamaat Ansarullah against Tajikistan.

The Afghan consulate in Tajikistan is now operated by Naqibullah Dehqanzada under the Islamic Emirate of Afghanistan and the embassy by Mohammad Zahir Aghbar under the Islamic Republic of Afghanistan.

=== Afghan military aircraft ===
Taliban government has called on Uzbekistan and Tajikistan to return Afghan military aircraft that had been flown there by pilots fleeing the collapse of the former Afghan government. Taliban Defense Minister Mullah Yaqoob warned both countries not to keep or use the planes and helicopters, saying the Taliban could take retaliatory steps. The aircraft had been taken to safety by Afghan pilots and their families shortly before the Taliban entered Kabul in August 2021.

=== Afghan Refugees ===
In July 2025, Tajikistan launched a large-scale crackdown on Afghan refugees, detaining and deporting many while giving them only 15 days to leave the country. The move affected thousands of Afghans, including some with valid documents, and drew criticism from UNHCR, which warned that forced returns could expose them to persecution and violence in Taliban-controlled Afghanistan. As of late 2024, approximately 9,000 Afghan refugees were officially registered in Tajikistan.

== Economic ties ==
Bilateral trade between Afghanistan and Tajikistan is currently around $40 million. Afghanistan has been purchasing as much as 150 megawatts of electricity from Tajikistan. The CASA-1000 is a $1.2 billion project under construction that will allow for the export of surplus hydroelectricity from Kyrgyzstan and Tajikistan to Afghanistan and then to Pakistan. There are a number of common markets along the Amu River, one of which is located between Ishkashim, Afghanistan and Ishkoshim, Tajikistan. Citizens of both countries shop and trade there without a travel visa.

== Border security ==
Afghanistan and Tajikistan share a roughly 1,300-kilometer (810 mi) border, which is monitored and controlled by both nations. Transportation links between the two countries, such as the Afghanistan-Tajikistan Bridge, have been rebuilt with assistance from external powers.

The Afghanistan–Tajikistan border is sometimes used by criminals for illegal activities. Border clashes are also reported between local security forces. In late 2024 a citizen of China working in Tajikistan was mysteriously killed. In 2018 four international cyclists were attacked and killed by militants in the Danghara District of Tajikistan.

== See also ==
- Foreign relations of Afghanistan
- Foreign relations of Tajikistan
- Afghanistan–Tajikistan border skirmishes
