= Zorkul =

Lake in Tajikistan

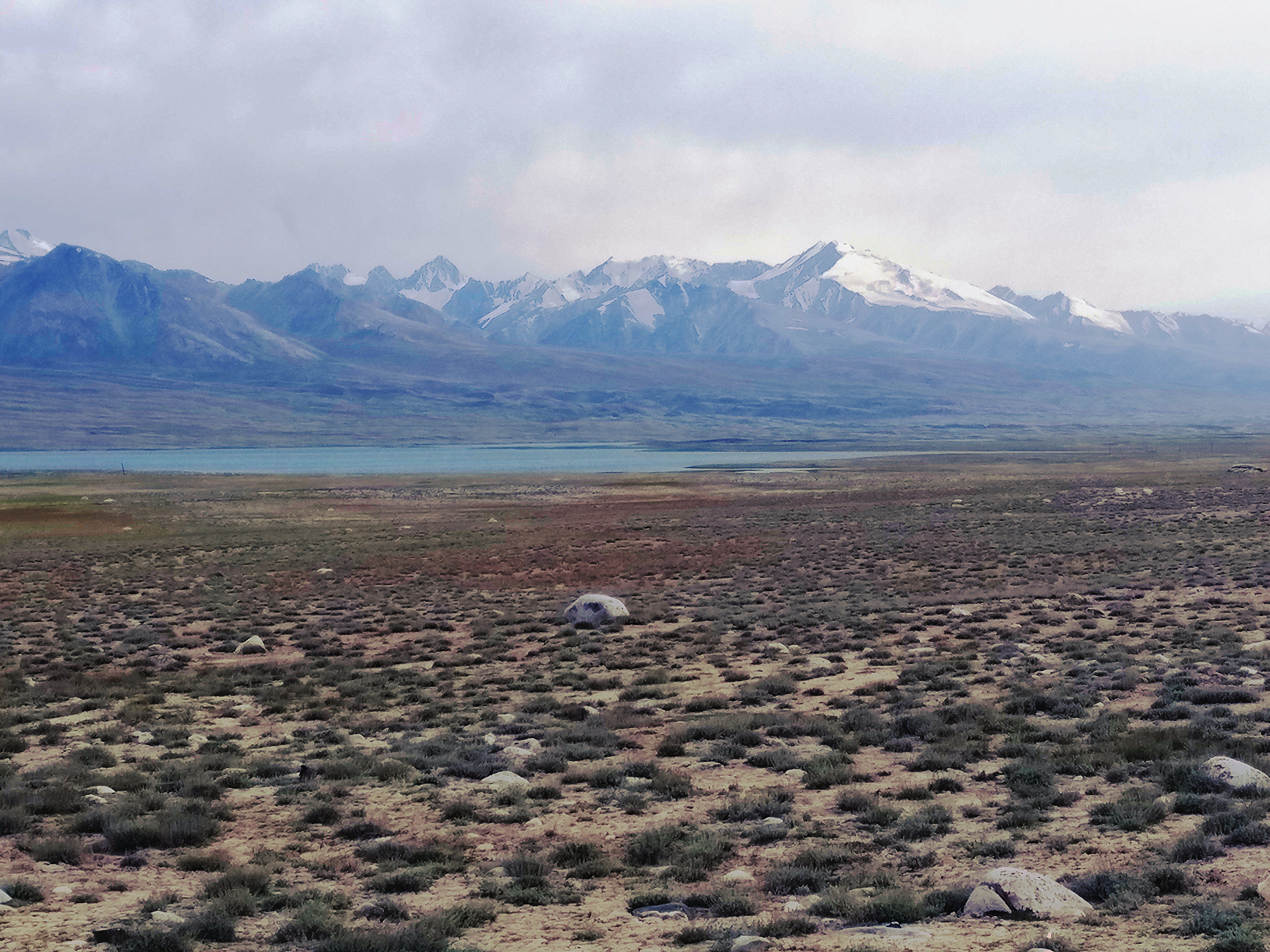
- The western end of lake Zorkul, where the Pamir River starts its course.

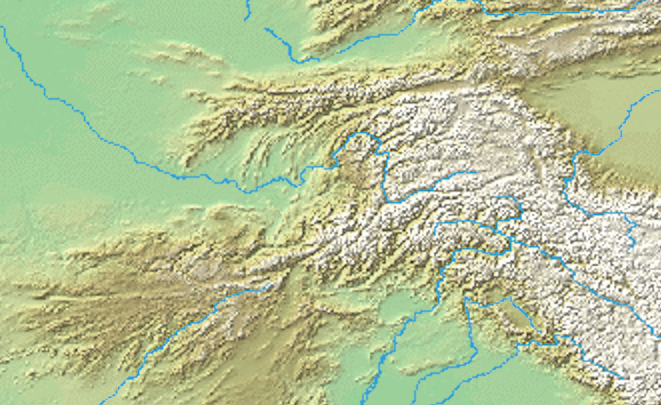
- Location within Tajikistan Location within Afghanistan Location within Pamir
- Interactive map of Zorkul
- Location: Pamir Mountains, Hindu Kush
- Coordinates: 37°27′N 73°42′E
- Primary outflows: Pamir River
- Basin countries: Afghanistan and Tajikistan
- Surface area: 38.9 km^{2} (15.0 sq mi)
- Surface elevation: 4,130 m (13,550 ft)

Ramsar Wetland
- Official name: Zorkul Lake
- Designated: 18 July 2001
- Reference no.: 1086

Zorkul (Dari: زارکول; Pashto: زارکول; Tajik: Зоркӯл, romanized: Zārkul) is a lake in the Pamir Mountains that runs along the border between the Wakhan District in Badakhshan Province of Afghanistan and the Gorno-Badakhshan autonomous region of Tajikistan. It is part of both the Wakhan National Park of Afghanistan and the Tajik National Park.

== Geography ==
Lake Zorkul extends east to west for about 25 km (16 mi). The Afghanistan–Tajikistan border runs along the lake from east to west, turning south towards Concord Peak (5,469 m (17,943 ft)), about 15 km (9.3 mi) south of the lake. The lake's northern part lies in Gorno-Badakhshan where it is protected as part of the Zorkul Nature Reserve. Out of the lake, towards the west, flows the Pamir River, tracing the Afghan–Tajik border. It is therefore a source of the Amu Darya (Amu River). The Great Pamir extends to the south of the lake.

== History ==
The lake is on the path of the Silk Road. It was referred to as "Great Dragon Pool" (Chinese: 大龍池) in Chinese historical records.

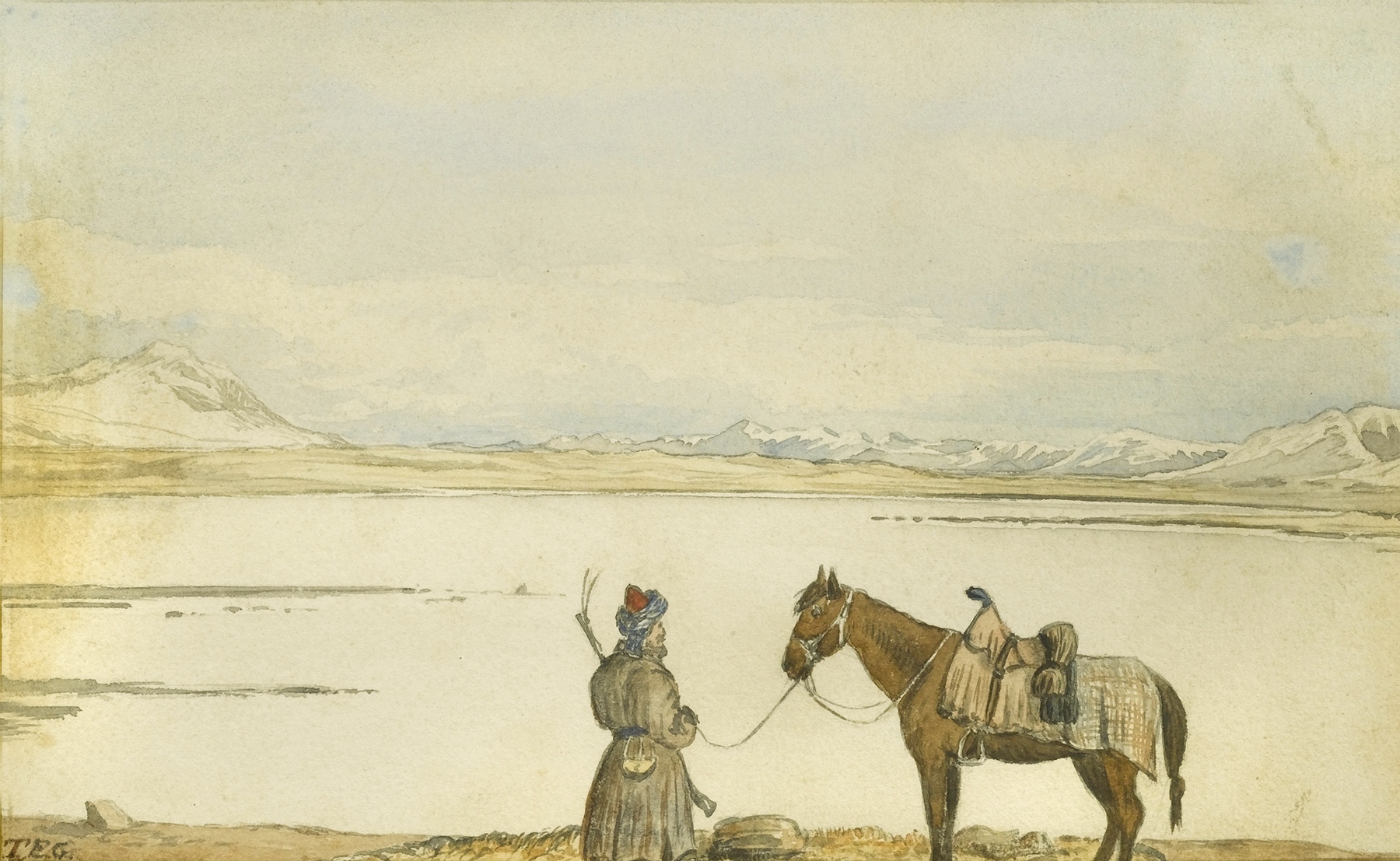
Zorkul, watercolor by Thomas Edward Gordon (2 May 1874)

The territory was conquered by Ahmad Shah Durrani in 1750 and became part of the Durrani Empire. The lake and river were established in 1895 as the new frontier between the Russian Empire and the Emirate of Afghanistan. A general treaty of friendship was signed between the two powers, agreeing that the lake area would be a nature reserve, and that neither empires will post national or international military forces within a certain distance of the frontier, nor establish settled communities in the area.

Although there is a probable reference to the lake in Marco Polo's account, the first European known to have visited the lake was the British naval officer John Wood in 1838. Sir-i-kol became known to the British as Lake Victoria, after the British queen, although Wood declined to name it so. It was also known as "Lake Victoria in the Pamirs" to distinguish it from the much larger Lake Victoria in Africa.

== See also ==
- Chaqmaqtin Lake
- Sarikol Range
