= Sargez =

Village in Badakhshan, Afghanistan

- Village
- Location within Afghanistan Location within Asia
- Coordinates: 36.9699°N 72.9087°E
- Country: Afghanistan
- Province: Badakhshan
- District: Wakhan
- Time zone: UTC+04:30 (Afghanistan Standard Time)

Sargez is a village in Wakhan District of Badakhshan Province in Afghanistan. It is located in Upper Wakhan which is made up of valleys of Wakhan and Pamir rivers and their tributaries, and the terrain between them.

== Demography ==
Sargez is a part of a cluster of villages called Baba Tungi. Per survey conducted by Wildlife Conservation Society in 2016, there are 8 households in Sargez with a total population of 100. The residents here own livestock and are involved in dairy production. They send their livestock in winter elsewhere as amanat because the village lacks grazing pastures in cold season.

== Tourism ==
The village lies at an elevation of 3040 meters above sea level. The area attracts a small number of tourists interested in wilderness trekking.

== See also ==
- Wakhan
- Wakhan Corridor
- Wakhan River
- Pamir River
