= E123 =

E123 may refer to:

- Amaranth (dye) or E123, a food additive
- Element 123, a predicted chemical element; see Extended periodic table § Superactinides
- European route E123, a road in central Asia
- E.123, an ITU-T recommendation
- E-123 Omega, a recurring character in Sonic the Hedgehog games
