= Kevran =

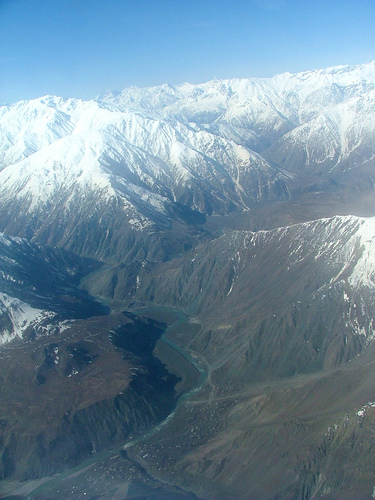
- Scenery near Kevron

- Location in Tajikistan
- Coordinates: 38°28′37″N 70°53′7″E
- Country: Tajikistan
- Region: Gorno-Badakhshan
- District: Darvoz District

Kevran (Tajik: Кеврон) is a village in Gorno-Badakhshan Autonomous Region in the Panj valley. It is located on the border between Afghanistan and Tajikistan. Nearby is the larger town of Kalai-Khumb. It is part of the jamoat Vishkharv in Darvoz District.
