= European route E123 =

Road in trans-European E-road network

E123

Route information
- Length: 2,760 km (1,710 mi)

Major junctions
- North end: Chelyabinsk, Russia
- Troitsk; Kostanai; Derzhavinsk; Kyzylorda; Shymkent; Tashkent; Lyagin; Koshkent; Istaravshan; Dushanbe
- South end: Panji Poyon, Tajikistan-Afghanistan

Location
- Countries: Russia; Kazakhstan; Uzbekistan; Tajikistan; Afghanistan

Highway system
- International E-road network; A Class; B Class

European route E123 is a Class A north-south reference European route that connects the Ural region with Central Asia, spanning 2,760 kilometres (1,710 mi).

== Route ==
The E123 routes through four Asian countries:

Russia

- A 310: Chelyabinsk - Troitsk - border with Kazakhstan

Kazakhstan

- M 36: Podgorodka – Kostanai
- P 36: Kostanai - Zapadnoye
- A 16: Zapadnoye – Esil – Derzhavinsk – Arkalyk – Zhezkazgan
- A 17: Zhezkazgan – Kyzylorda
- M 32: Kyzylorda – Shymkent
- A 2: Shymkent – Frontovoy - Border of Uzbekistan

Uzbekistan

- M39 : Border of Kazakhstan - G‘ishtko‘prik - Tashkent - Chinoz - Sirdaryo
- M34 : Sirdaryo - Xovos

Tajikistan

- РБ15 РБ15 Road: Border of Uzbekistan - Zarafshon - Istaravshan
- РБ01 РБ01 Road: Istaravshan - Spitamen - Ayni - Dushanbe
- РБ09 РБ09 Road: Dushanbe - Qizilqala - Bokhtar - Panji Poyon

Afghanistan

- Sher Khan Bandar

The E123 is only signed in Russia and Kazakhstan. In Russia (as well as and Kazakhstan), European route numbers are signposted on direction signs, however this is not the case in many other Asian countries.
