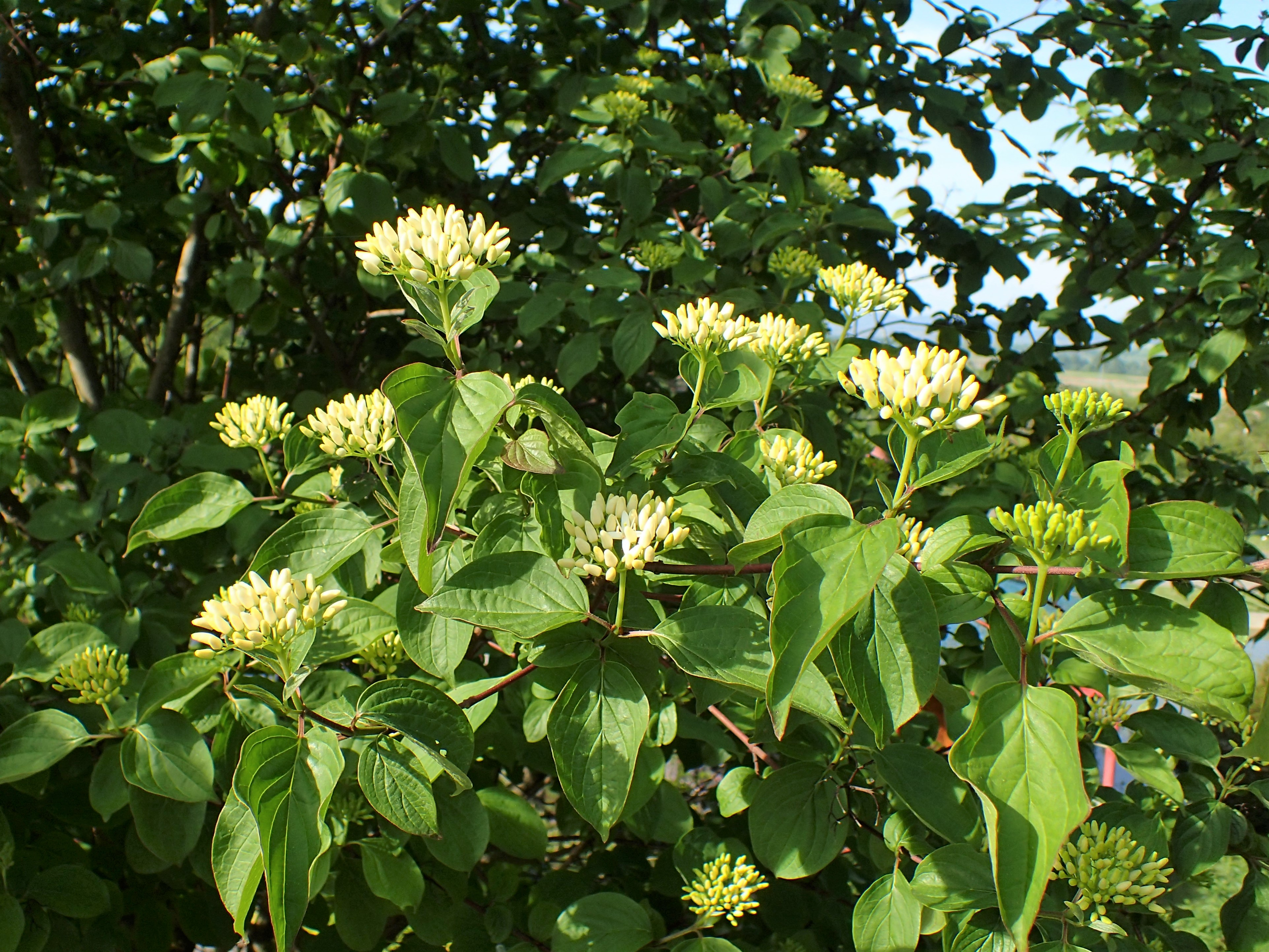

Conservation status
- Critically Endangered (IUCN 3.1)

Scientific classification
- Kingdom: Plantae
- Clade: Tracheophytes
- Clade: Angiosperms
- Clade: Eudicots
- Clade: Asterids
- Order: Cornales
- Family: Cornaceae
- Genus: Cornus
- Species: C. darvasica

Binomial name
- Cornus darvasica (Pojark.) Pilip.

Synonyms
- Swida darvasica (Pojark.) Soják; Thelycrania darvasica Pojark.

= Cornus darvasica =

Species of plant

Cornus darvasica is a species of plant in the family Cornaceae that is endemic to Tajikistan.

== Distribution and habitat ==
C. darvasica is known only from a single site in the Darvaz area of Tajikistan, east of Kalai-Khumb, where it grows in shrubby thickets on the slopes of gorges, occupying an area of less than 10 km^{2} (3.9 sq mi).
