= Concord Peak =

Mountain on the Afghan-Tajik border

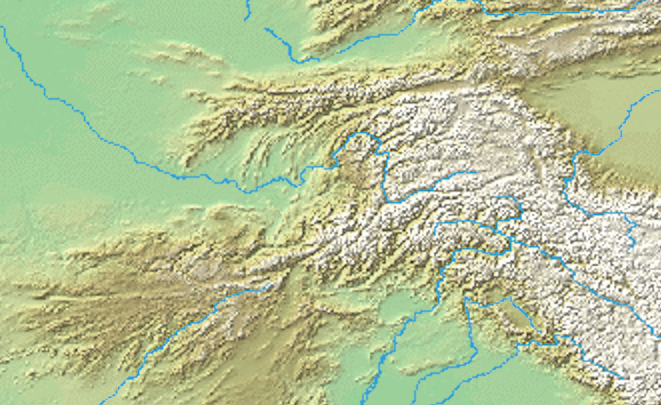
- Location within Tajikistan Location within Afghanistan Location within Pamir

Highest point
- Elevation: 5,469 m (17,943 ft)
- Prominence: 569 m (1,867 ft)
- Coordinates: 37°19′59″N 73°45′58″E

Geography
- Location: Afghanistan–Tajikistan
- Parent range: Pamir Mountains

Concord Peak or Pik Soglasiya is a mountain of the Pamirs, on the Afghan-Tajik border, about 15 km (9 mi) south of Lake Zorkul. The mountain is located in the Wakhan District in Badakhshan Province of Afghanistan and the Gorno-Badakhshan autonomous region of Tajikistan.
