= Koshkent =

Koshkent Кошкент
- Selo
- Location within Republic of Dagestan Location within Russia
- Coordinates: 41°44′N 48°02′E
- Country: Russia
- Region: Republic of Dagestan
- District: Khivsky District
- Time zone: UTC+3:00

Koshkent (Russian: Кошкент) is a rural locality (a selo) and the administrative center of Koshkentsky Selsoviet, Khivsky District, Republic of Dagestan, Russia. Population: 645 (2010 census); 656 (2002 census); 540 (1989 Soviet census). There are 17 streets in this selo.

== Geography ==
It is located 9 km from Khiv (the district's administrative centre), 144 km from Makhachkala (capital of Dagestan) and 1,782 km from Moscow. Dardarkent is the nearest rural locality.
