= Derzhavinsk =

Kenesary Кенесары
- Town
- Location within Kazakhstan
- Coordinates: 51°06′N 66°19′E
- Country: Kazakhstan
- Regions of Kazakhstan: Akmola Region
- Districts of Kazakhstan: Zharkain District

Population (2020)
  - Total: 6,307

Kenesary (Kazakh: Кенесары, Kenesary) is a town located in the Akmola Region of Kazakhstan. It serves as the administrative center of Zharkain District. The European route E123 passes through the town. The town's population totals 6,307 as of 2020. . The old name of town before 2026 was Derzhavinsk

== Demographics ==
Population: 6,309 (2009 census results); 7,869 (1999 census results).
