= Grattacielo Intesa Sanpaolo =

Coordinates: 45°04′10″N 7°39′46″E

- The building as it appeared in June 2015
- Interactive map of the Grattacielo Intesa Sanpaolo area

General information
- Type: Commercial offices
- Location: Turin, Italy
- Construction started: 2011
- Completed: 2014
- Opened: 2014
- Cost: ~ € 235 million
- Owner: Intesa Sanpaolo

Height
- Roof: 167.25 m (548.7 ft)

Technical details
- Floor count: 38 (+ 6 underground)
- Lifts/elevators: 25

Design and construction
- Architect: Renzo Piano
- Engineer: Expedition Engineering and Studio Ossola, Jacobs Engineering Group, Manens-Tifs s.p.a.
- Main contractor: Rizzani de Eccher

Grattacielo Intesa Sanpaolo in Turin, Italy is a skyscraper as well as the headquarters for the banking group Intesa Sanpaolo.

== Features ==
The building is the third tallest in the city, after the landmark Mole Antonelliana which has held the record since 1889, and Piedmont Region Headquarters. It provides office accommodation for more than 2,000 employees as well as providing leisure facilities for the general public. At its summit, a rooftop greenhouse houses Piano35, a public restaurant, alongside a roof garden and a panoramic terrace that provides far-reaching views over the city. At its base, a 364-seat multifunctional public hall/auditorium is hung from the transfer trusses four stories above ground level.

Renzo Piano, Grattacielo Intesa Sanpaolo's architect, described the skyscraper as a "bioclimatic building", being naturally ventilated and cooled; with a substantial amount of its power requirement to be generated from photovoltaic panels that cover the southern façade. It was awarded the LEED Platinum rating, making it the only high-rise building in Europe to hold such a certification.

== History ==
Grattacielo Intesa Sanpaolo under construction in 2012

The project was first introduced to the municipality in November 2007. After controversies on its height and the impact on the skyline, construction eventually started in December 2008. The Intesa Sanpaolo tower was envisioned by Renzo Piano and subsequently built by the Italian main contractor Rizzani de Eccher and Swiss Implenia on an area of about 160 x 45 m between corso Inghilterra, corso Vittorio Emanuele II, via Cavalli and the Nicola Grosa Park.

In December 2014, construction was completed and the first 50 employees of the Bank moved in the new premises. In 2016, readers of ArchDaily magazine voted the tower winner of the Building of the Year award, in the office category.

== See also ==
- Piedmont Region Headquarters
