= Zharkain District =

Coordinates: 51°08′24″N 66°18′36″E

Zharkain
- District
- Jarqaiyñ audany
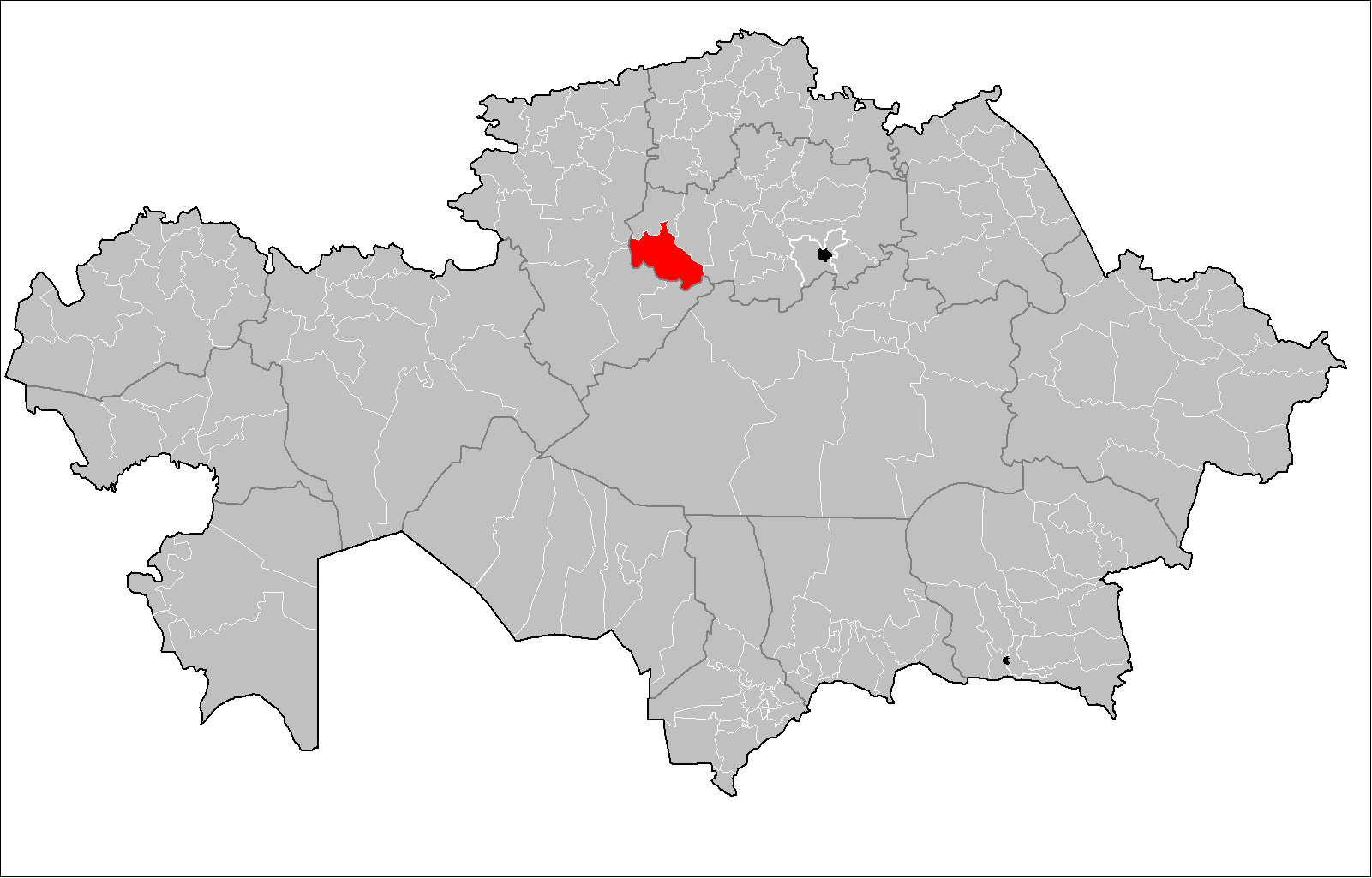
- Country: Kazakhstan
- Region: Aqmola Region
- Administrative center: Derzhavinsk
- Founded: 1955

Government
  - Akim: Khamitov Zhanbolat Kameridovich

Area
  - Total: 4,700 sq mi (12,100 km^{2})

Population (2013)
  - Total: 15,041
- Time zone: UTC+6 (East)
- Website: http://zharkain.gov.kz/

Zharkain District (Kazakh: Жарқайың ауданы, Jarqaiyñ audany) is a district of Aqmola Region in northern Kazakhstan. The administrative center of the district is the town of Derzhavinsk. Population: 24,326 (2009 census results); 15,423 (1999 census results).

== Geography ==
Zharkainsky district is located in the southwestern part of the Akmola region of the Republic of Kazakhstan. It borders in the southwestern part with the Kostanay region, in the north - with the Esil region, in the east - with the Zhaksyn and Atbasar regions.

The city of Derzhavinsk is located on the banks of the river. Ishim River, rich in fish stocks. The sights include the "red mazarka", a birch grove, lakes with. Shoyyndykol, richness of flora and fauna. "Red Mazarka" is the only surviving architectural monument in the region, it is interesting for the "wisdom" of the production of materials, the brick is no worse than refractory.
