= Qal'ai Khumb =

Qal'ai Khumb Russian: Калаихум Tajik: Қалъаи Хумб
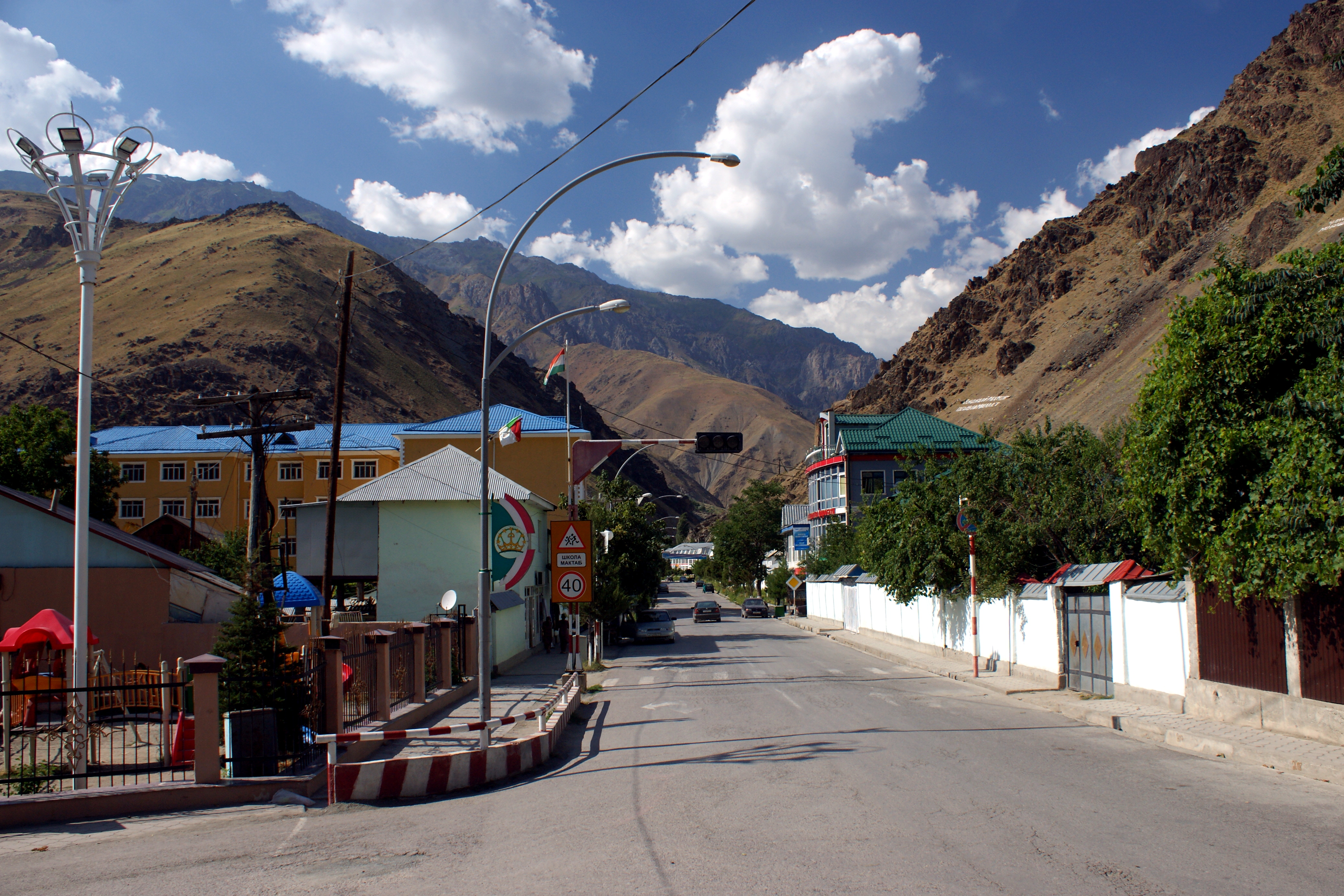
- View from eastern end of town (near mosque)

- Location in Tajikistan
- Coordinates: 38°27′59″N 70°47′48″E
- Country: Tajikistan
- Region: Gorno-Badakhshan Autonomous Region
- District: Darvoz district
- Established: XV
- Elevation: 1,200 m (3,900 ft)

Population
  - Total: 1,909
- Time zone: UTC+5 (GMT)
  - Summer (DST): UTC+5 (GMT)
- Postal code: 736400
- Area code: +992 3552
- Climate: Csa
- Official languages: Russian (Interethnic); Tajik (State)

Qal'ai Khumb (Russian: Калаихум, Tajik: Қалъаи Хумб, Qal‘a‘i Xumb/Qal'haji Xumв — meaning fortress on the banks of the river of Khumb) or Qal'a-i-Khum, also Kalai-Khumb (transliterated from Russian: Калай-Хумб), is a border town located in the Gorno-Badakhshan Autonomous Region of Tajikistan, next to the border with Afghanistan. In the past it was the center of the independent Principality of Darvaz. It is now the capital of the Darvoz District of Tajikistan. The Pamir Highway meets here the Panj River.

The town is an important overnight rest stop between Kulob and Khorugh, located at a distance of 168 km (104 mi) from Kulob (or 368 km (229 mi) from Dushanbe) and 235 km (146 mi) from Khorugh. It has several hotels to accommodate travelers on their way between cities. The town is almost entirely surrounded by the Pamir Mountains.

The town is connected by road with Afghanistan via the Tajik–Afghan Friendship Bridge. The Saturday cross-border trade market, which was closed for several years, has been reopened recently.

== History ==
In the 17th century the town was capital of the small mirdom of Darwaz.This small state held sway of many of its neighbours including the mirdoms of Ragh to the west, and Roshan and Shughnan to the east. Eventually the mirs of Darwaz ruled as far away as inkashim and the wakan valley.

The people of Kala e Khum at this time spoke the Darwazi language, but eventually the principality was conquered by the more powerful kingdoms of Bukhara and Afghanistan. The Darwazi language was persecuted by the emir of Bukhara such that the language is now extinct North of the Panj river but is still spoke on the opposite side of the river.

Archaeology has found that in the Middle Ages Kala e khum was a large and prosperous town, grown rich as an important stop on the Silk Road.

== See also ==
- Afghanistan–Tajikistan border
- Land border crossings of Afghanistan
