= Ruzvat =

Ruzvat Рузват
- Village
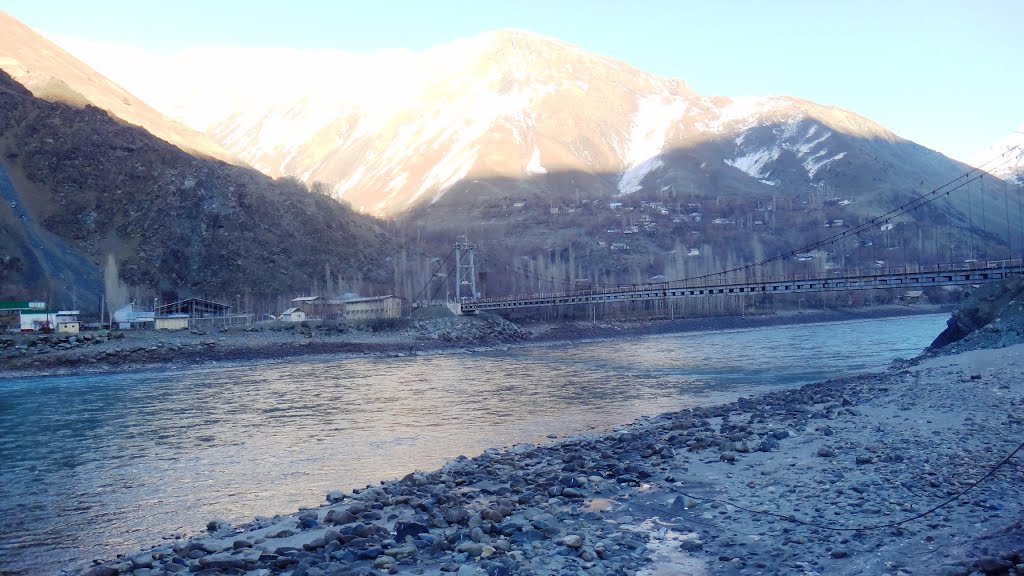
- Friendship Bridge between Afghanistan and Tajikistan

- Location in Tajikistan
- Coordinates: 38°26′35″N 70°48′20″E
- Country: Tajikistan
- Region: Gorno-Badakhshan
- Elevation: 3,900 ft (1,200 m)
- Time zone: + 4.30

Rusvat or (Tajik: Рузват) is a village in Gorno-Badakhshan, southern Tajikistan. The village is connected to the Afghan village of Nusay via the Tajik–Afghan Friendship Bridge.

In 2012, the ruins of the ancient Castle Karon and the surrounding settlement was discovered to the east of Ruzvat.
