= Pamir River =

River in Tajikistan and Afghanistan

Coordinates: 37°01′N 72°39′E

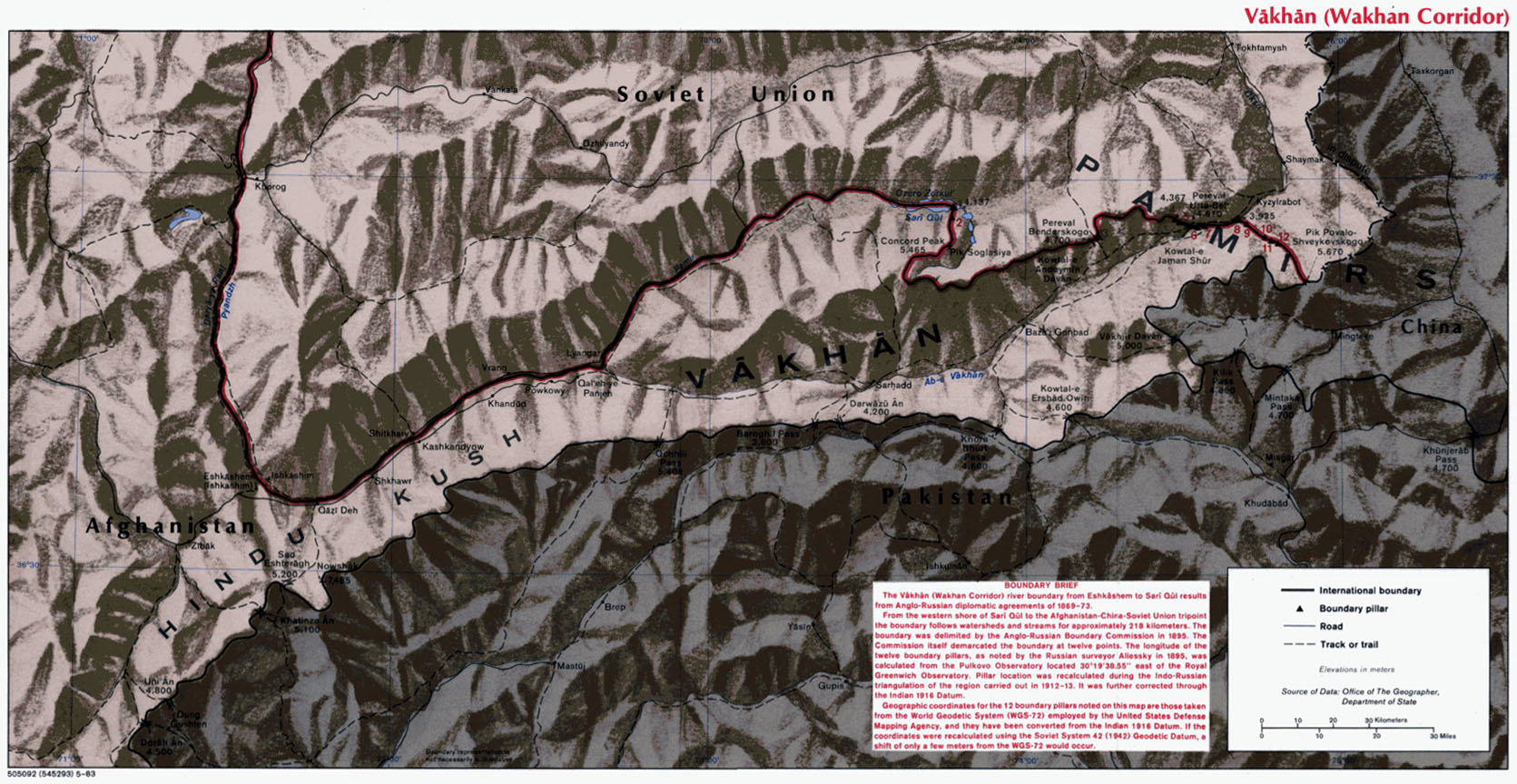
Map of Wakhan Corridor, including the Pamir

The Pamir River is a shared river located in the Badakhshan Province of Afghanistan and in the Gorno-Badakhshan in Tajikistan. It is a tributary of the Panj River, and forms the northern boundary of Afghanistan's Wakhan District.

The river has its sources in the Pamir Mountains in the far eastern part of Gorno-Badakhshan, Tajikistan. It flows between the Alichur mountain range in the north and the Wakhan District in the south. It starts from the Lake Zorkul, at a height of 4,130 meters, and then flows west, and later southwest. Near the town of Langar, at 2,799 m, its confluences with the Wakhan River forms the Panj River. The Pamir forms the boundary between Afghanistan and Tajikistan along its entire length. Northwest of Langar is the 6,726 m (22,067 ft) high Karl Marx Peak and Friedrich Engels Peak (6,507 m (21,348 ft)). A road runs along the river on the Tajik side to Khargush where it turns north to join the Pamir Highway. A road of lower quality continues east past Zorkul, almost to the Chinese border.

Scottish explorer John Wood was the first known European to try to find the source of the Oxus, or Pamir River. He made a pioneering journey in 1839 and reached Lake Zorkul.

== See also ==
- List of rivers in Afghanistan
