= Dardarkent =

Dardarkent Дардаркент Дардархуьр
- Selo
- Location within Republic of Dagestan Location within Russia
- Coordinates: 41°44′N 48°01′E
- Country: Russia
- Region: Republic of Dagestan
- District: Khasavyurtovsky District
- Time zone: UTC+3:00

Dardarkent (Russian: Дардаркент; Lezgian: Дардархуьр) is a rural locality (a selo) in Koshkentsky Selsoviet, Khivsky District, Republic of Dagestan, Russia. Population: 371 (2010 census); 285 (2002 census); 228 (1989 Soviet census).

== Geography ==
Dardarkent is located 20 km southeast of Khiv (the district's administrative centre) by road. Koshkent is the nearest rural locality.
