= CASA-1000 =

Proposed infrastructure project in Asia

The Central Asia-South Asia power project, commonly known by the acronym CASA-1000, is a $1.2 billion project currently under construction that will allow for the export of surplus hydroelectricity from Kyrgyzstan and Tajikistan to Afghanistan and Pakistan. Groundbreaking for the project took place in May 2016 by leaders of the four nations. The project is expected to be completed by the end of 2026.

== Project details ==
Funding for the CASA-1000 comes from various sources. The project will allow for the export of 1,300 megawatts (MW) of electricity during the summer months when both Tajikistan and Kyrgyzstan experience surplus electricity generation from hydroelectric dams.

In April 2025, work on the high voltage direct current (HVDC) converter stations was completed, including the laying down of a 485 kilometer-long and 500 kilovolt (kV) alternating current transmission line between Datka in Kyrgyzstan and Khujand in Tajikistan. A 1,300 MW AC/DC converter station was also constructed in Sangtuda, Tajikistan. A 750 km HVDC line would be constructed between there and the Pakistani city of Nowshera, passing through Kabul in Afghanistan. A 1,300 MW DC/AC converter station is also being constructed in Nowshera and it will be connected to Pakistan's electric grid. The transmission line is designed to transmit up to 1,300 MW of electricity to Pakistan. Additionally, an existing 220 kV AC line between Tajikistan and Afghanistan is being modified for a back-to-back HVDC connection. The modification will allow Afghanistan to draw up to 300 MW more power from the existing 220 kV transmission line.

The CASA-1000 project was inaugurated in February 2020, in a ceremony attended by the then-Afghan President Ashraf Ghani and Pakistani Ambassador Zahid Nasrullah Khan. As of October 2025, approximately 75% of the project covering Afghanistan has been completed.
