= Rizzani de Eccher =

Italian construction company

Rizzani de Eccher S.p.A.
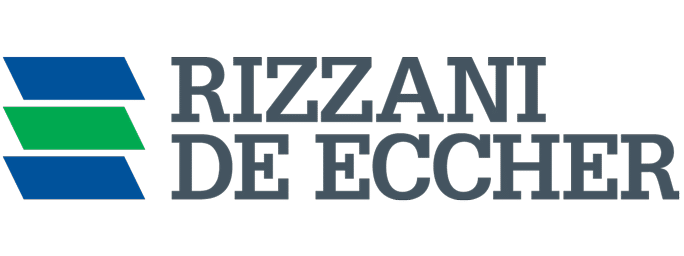
- Type: Private Società per azioni
- Industry: Construction, civil engineering
- Founded: 1831
- Headquarters: Pozzuolo del Friuli, Italy
- Key people: Paolo Amato; Massimo Lucchini; Alberto Franzone; Roberto Rondelli; Matteo Macciò; Massimo Sala
- Products: Infrastructure and industrial plant construction; motorway operating concessions
- Revenue: ▲€ 510 million (2021)
- Number of employees: ▲1564 (2021)
- Subsidiaries: Rizzani de Eccher USA Inc., Sacaim S.p.A., Deal S.r.l., Tensacciai S.r.l., Tensa America LLC, Immobiliare Rizzani de Eccher (IRiDe) S.r.l., de Eccher Interiors S.r.l.
- Website: https://rde.it/

Rizzani de Eccher S.p.A. is an Italian general contractor with headquarters in Pozzuolo del Friuli, Italy, active globally in the areas of engineering, infrastructure and buildings construction.

== History ==
Rizzani was established in Udine, Italy in 1831. Over the following century, Rizzani developed its presence in Italy and ventured in several countries in Africa, Asia and Latin America.

In 1948 Riccardo de Eccher established the company bearing his name in the northern Italian region of Trentino Alto Adige engaging in real estate development.

In 1970 Riccardo de Eccher takes over Rizzani. Ten years later, the construction of two segments of the Carnia-Tarvisio motorway marked the acquisition of technologies for prefabrication and the launching of overhead bridges. These technologies will be constantly developed over the successive years and finally consolidated into Deal S.r.l., a group affiliate specialized in advanced bridge construction technologies. In 1982 the first important overseas project of Rizzani De Eccher was acquired – five schools in Algeria. In 1984 five landmark projects were acquired in what was then the Soviet Union, becoming the first registered Western contractor in the Soviet Union, and marking the beginning of a successful expansion in Russia. The following years were marked by a swift growth. The Group's consolidated revenues grew from 37 billion lira in 1986 to 228 billion lira in 1990. In 1994 the difficult conditions of the infrastructure and construction Italian market, generally related to mani pulite, the Company decided to focus towards overseas markets. In 2004 Rizzani de Eccher first appeared in the top ten Italian contractors and in the world's 100 largest contractors rankings compiled by Engineering News-Record. By 2005, through its established presence in many countries (Russia and other CIS countries through its Codest subsidiary, Middle East, Mediterranean Basin and North and Central America), the share of overseas revenues tops 70%. It operates in four areas of activity: general building, infrastructure development, equipment manufacturing and specialised engineering for bridges and viaducts and real estate development. Thanks to its consolidated position in several countries (such as the Middle East, East Asia, North and Central America as well as Africa), the Group's share of turnover from overseas operations has always been above 70% since 2005.

The Group operates in the construction sector in three distinct areas:

- General contracting of buildings and infrastructure
- Design, engineering and special equipment and technologies for bridge construction
- Real estate development.

== Projects by Area ==
Italy

- Torre Intesa Sanpaolo, design by Renzo Piano (Turin)
- Portopiccolo Residential Complex Sistiana (Trieste)
- Requalification of Brescia Hospital (Brescia)
- CityLife (Milan), design by Daniel Libeskind and Zaha Hadid
- Reconstruction of Teatro della Fenice (Venice)
- Restoration of Fondaco dei Tedeschi Palace, design by Rem Koolhaas (Venice)
- Milano Central Station (Milan)
- Cattinara Hospital (Trieste)
- Nuovo Salesi Hospital (Ancona)
- Tramway Sir 1 (Padua)
- Multifunctional Complex (Treviso)
- Naval Base (Taranto)
- Marghera Cable-Stayed Bridge (Venice)
- Therme Hotel & SPA (Merano)
- Modern and Contemporary Museum (Bolzano)
- Perfetti Van Melle Industrial Complex (Lainate)
- A32-Bardonecchia Motorway (Turin)
- A23-Udine-Tarvisio Motorway
- Milan-Naples Motorway
- A24-Rome-L'Aquila-Teramo Motorway
- A20-Messina-Palermo Motorway

Europe

- Y-Towers Hotel and Residences (Amsterdam, the Netherlands)
- Bispebjerg Hospital (Copenhagen, Denmark). Rescinded after negligence by Rizzani de Eccher
- VTB Arena Park (Moscow, Russia)
- VTB Arena – Central Stadium Dynamo (Moscow, Russia)
- Docklands-City Airport DLR (Docklands Light Railway) (London, UK)
- Cloche d'Or Shopping Center and Residential Towers (Gasperich, Luxembourg)
- Four Seasons Hotel Baku (Baku, Azerbaijan)
- Multi-purpose Centre (Lugano, Switzerland)
- Olympic Complex Luzhniki Swimming Pool (Moscow, Russia)
- Ducat Place III (Moscow, Russia)
- Design and Construction of a Pavillon of Moscow Exhibition Center (Moscow, Russia)
- Balchug Office Complex (Moscow, Russia)
- Residential Complex Granatny (Moscow, Russia)
- Most Bank Office Building (Moscow, Russia)
- Tobacco Factory for Ligget Ducat (Moscow, Russia)
- Vnukovo International Airport (Moscow, Russia)
- Domodedovo International Airport (Moscow, Russia)
- Pedestrian Bridge on Moskva River (Moscow, Russia)
- 15 Storey Residential Building for St Kapranov LTD (Moscow, Russia)
- Shell & Core Residential Building Stolnik (Moscow, Russia)
- Industrial Complex for Cremonini Group (Moscow, Russia)
- Moscow Medical Center (Russia)
- Krylatsky Hills Business Park (Moscow, Russia)
- Design and Construction Industrial Plant (Lipetsk, Russia)
- Industrial Plant for the Production of Tiles (Stupino, Russia)
- Residential Complex at Kazan (Russia)
- Radisson Hotel Kiev (Ukraine)
- Baku Business Center (Baku, Azerbaijan)
- Kársnesskóli New Elementary School (Kópavogur, Iceland). Rescinded after negligence by Rizzani de Eccher.

Americas

- Google Hudson Square HQs (New York City)
- Miami I-395 (Florida, US)
- Miami Metro Orange Line (Florida, US)
- Palmetto Dolphin Interchange (Florida, US)
- Washington Bypass (North Carolina, US)
- Manhattan West Development Platform (New York City)
- Hathaway Bay Bridge (Florida, US)
- High Five Interchange (Dallas, US)
- Dulles Corridor Metrorail Project (Virginia, US)
- Richmond-Vancouver Airport Light Railway (Canada)
- Elevated Guideway for the Skytrain (Vancouver, Canada)
- Millennium Line Vancouver Light Railway (Vancouver, Canada)
- Evergreen Line Rapid Transit Project (Vancouver, Canada)
- Réseau Express Métropolitain (REM) (Montréal, Canada)
- Cuscatan Bridge (San Salvador, El Salvador)
- San Marcos Bridge (San Salvador, El Salvador)
- Water Treatment Plant (Montego Bay, Jamaica)
- Kingston Regional Hospital (Kingston, Jamaica)
- St Ann's Bay Regional Hospital (Jamaica)
- Mandeville Regional Hospital (Jamaica)

Middle East, Asia & Oceania

- Al Udeid Military Base (Doha, Qatar)
- Dubai Metro (Dubai, UAE)
- Golden Market (Abu Dhabi, UAE)
- Sheikh Zayed Grand Mosque (Abu Dhabi, UAE)
- ADCO (Abu Dhabi, UAE)
- Marjan Island Channel Crossings (Ras al Khaimah, UAE)
- Private International Roads at Jebel Haffet (Al Ain, UAE)
- Shore Protection and Site Preparation Works in Dad Island (Abu Dhabi, UAE)
- Jamal Abdul Nasser Street (Kuwait City, Kuwait)
- North Manama Causeway (Manama, Bahrain)
- Al Kharj Flour Mill (Riyadh, Saudi Arabia)
- Summerland Kempinski Hotel & Resort (Beirut, Lebanon)
- Almaty International Airport (Almaty, Kazakhstan)
- Residential Complex (Atyrau, Kazakhstan)
- Presidential Palace (Dushanbe', Tajikistan)
- Ismaili Centre (Dushanbe', Tajikistan)
- Tajikistan–Afghanistan bridge at Panji Poyon
- Manila LRT Line 2 (Manila, Philippines)
- Ho Chi Minh City Mass Rail Transit (Ho Chi Minh City, Vietnam)
- South Road Superway (Adelaide, Australia)

Africa

- RN77 highway between Jijel and El Eulma (Algeria)
- Oued Tlélat – Tlmcen High Speed Railway (Algeria)
- Andilana Beach Resort (Nosy Be, Madagascar)
- Entebbe International Airport (Kampala, Uganda)
- Bata International Airport (Equatorial Guinea)
- Patani Bridge (Niger Delta, Nigeria)
- Lagos Osborne Bridge (Lagos, Nigeria)
- El Ain Sokhna Thermal Power Plant (Egypt)

== Awards ==
- ENR Best Bridge or Tunnel Project 2020: Matagarup Pedestrian Bridge (originally Swan River Pedestrian Bridge), located in Perth, Australia
- ENR Best Sports or Entertainment Project 2020: VTB Arena – Dynamo Central Stadium, located in Moscow, Russian Federation
- Johnson Controls ASPESI "Skyline – Sua Altezza il Grattacielo" Award 2019: Rizzani de Eccher for the construction of Torre Intesa SanPaolo "for its high habitability and maximum eco-sustainability certified Leed Platinum, strongly consolidates the smart vocation of the city of Turin".
- ENR's Top 100 Global Contractors Award 2018: Rizzani de Eccher

== Financial Data ==
- In 2021, the Group recorded revenues for €510,06 million, ending the financial year with a loss of € -21,758 million.
- In 2020, the Group recorded revenues for €405.5 million, ending the financial year with a loss of € -34.562 million.
- In 2019, the Group recorded revenues for €574,9 million, ending the financial year with a loss of € -13,097 million.
- In 2018, the Group recorded revenues for €960,1 million, ending the financial year with a loss of € -48,182 million.
