= Panji Poyon =

Panji Poyon Панҷи Поён Nizhniy Pyandzh
- outpost
- Location in Tajikistan
- Coordinates: 37°11′43″N 68°34′43″E
- Country: Tajikistan
- Viloyat: Khatlon
- Elevation: 1,089 ft (332 m)

Panji Poyon (Tajik: Панҷи Поён), also known since the times of the Soviet Union as Nizhny Panj (from Russian: Нижний Пяндж, Nizhniy Pyandzh) is a border checkpoint on the Tajik side of the Afghanistan-Tajikistan border. Both Tajik and Russian names mean literally "Lower Panj". It is the place of an Afghanistan-Tajikistan Bridge across the Panj River. At the opposite side of the river lies the Sherkhan Bandar of Kunduz Province, Afghanistan.

It is the last point on the European route E123.

The outpost witnesses the increase of drug traffic. Within the framework of international cooperation, in 2008 the new customs facility was built with the help of the United States at the outpost.

Panji Poyon has recorded the highest temperature ever recorded in Tajikistan: 48.0 °C (118.4 °F).
