= Sher Khan Bandar =

Sher Khan Bandar شیر خان بندر
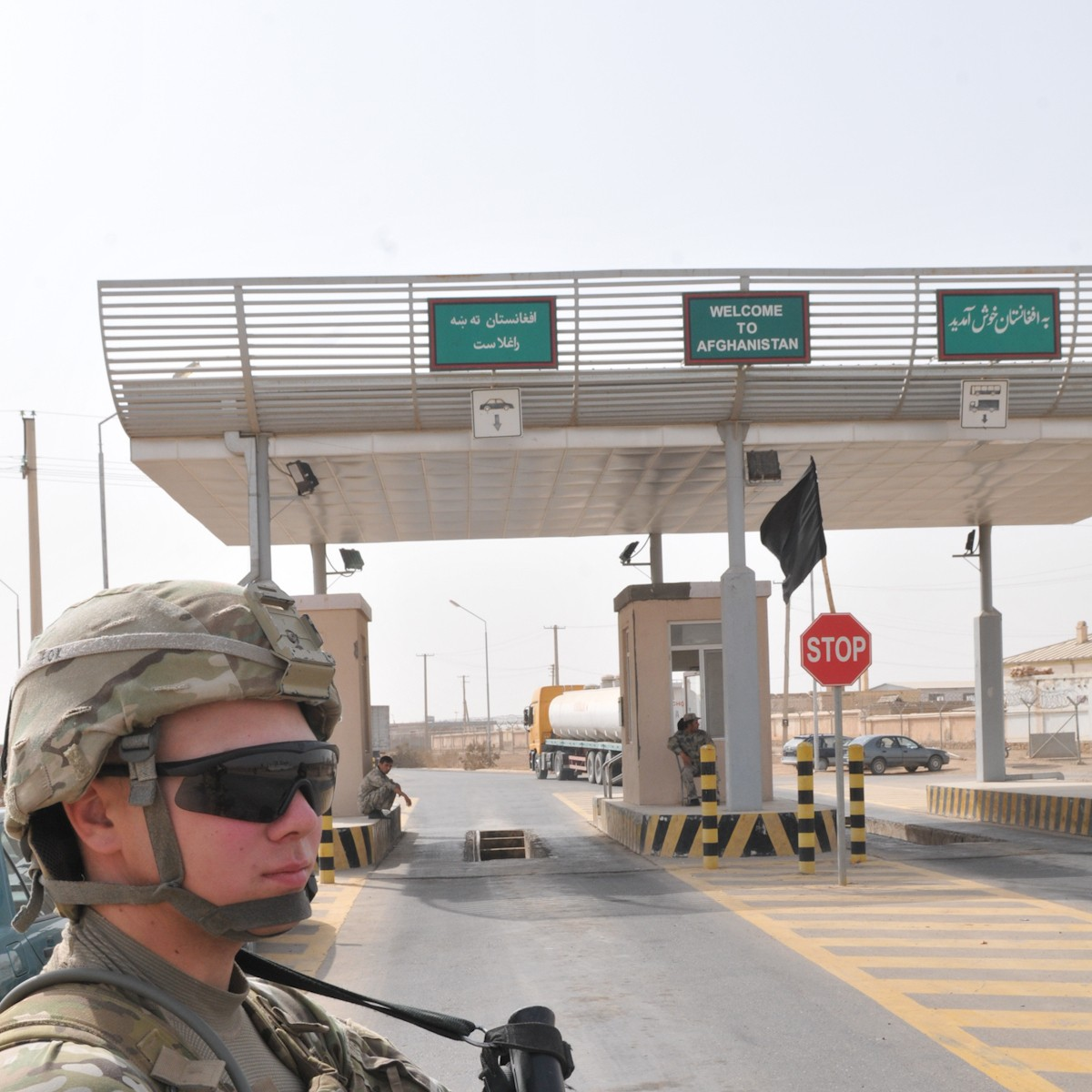
- The entry point into Sher Khan, Afghanistan (2011)

- Location in Afghanistan
- Coordinates: 37°11′0″N 68°25′01″E
- Country: Afghanistan
- Province: Kunduz
- District: Imam Sahib
- Time zone: + 4.30

Sher Khan or Shir Khan (Pashto: شیر خان بندر; Dari: شیرخان بندر, Uzbek: Sherxon-Bandar, شېرخان بندر) is a border town in the northern Kunduz Province of Afghanistan, next to the Panj River. The town's main attraction is the Sher Khan Bandar, which is a dry port and border checkpoint that officially connects by road Afghanistan with neighboring Tajikistan. It is located about 8 km (5.0 mi) northwest from the center of the town. The city of Kunduz is about 60 km (37 mi) of driving distance south from Sher Khan Bandar. The historical name of the town was Qizil Qalah. It was given the current name in honor of Sher Khan Nashir, Khan of the Nashers. The town has around 600 families.

Situated at an altitude of approximately 339 m (1,112 ft) in the Imam Sahib District of Kunduz Province, Sher Khan Bandar serves as one of the official land border crossings of Afghanistan with neighboring Tajikistan. It is a major transporting, shipping and receiving location. It has various facilities of different sizes, including Afghan government offices. Security in and around the town is provided by the Afghan National Security Forces. Every traveler between Afghanistan and Tajikistan is required to possess a valid travel visa.

Sher Khan began to grow after the completion of the Tajik–Afghan bridge at Panji Poyon in 2007. Its southern end is the official port of entry into Afghanistan. The bridge and the easy connectivity with Tajikistan boosted trade between Afghanistan and Central Asia. It has been reported in the past that as many as 400 shipping trucks passed through the town every day, carrying trade goods from one country to the other. This trade has also made many local shop owners wealthy. In November 2012, Afghan officials announced that they plan to build about 2,000 new residential houses, 41 business plazas including offices, shops and stores.

== See also ==
- Afghanistan–Tajikistan border
- Afghanistan–Tajikistan relations
- Land border crossings of Afghanistan
