= Nusay =

Nusay نوسی Nusai
- Village
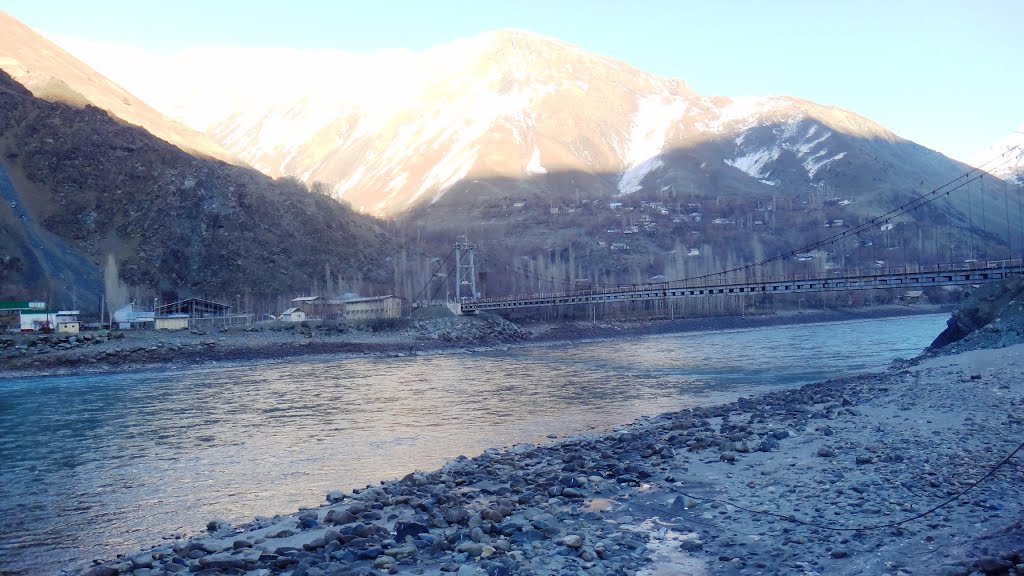
- Friendship Bridge between Afghanistan and Tajikistan

- Location in Afghanistan
- Coordinates: 38°26′35″N 70°48′20″E
- Country: Afghanistan
- Province: Badakhshan
- District: Nusay
- Elevation: 3,900 ft (1,200 m)
- Time zone: + 4.30

Nusay or Nusai (Dari: نسی) is a village in Nusay District, Badakhshan Province, northeastern Afghanistan.

The village is connected to the Tajik village of Ruzvat via the Tajik–Afghan Friendship Bridge.

== See also ==
- Badakhshan Province
