= Darvoz District =

Darvoz District Russian: Дарвазский район Tajik: Ноҳияи Дарвоз
- District
- Location of Darvoz District in Tajikistan
- Coordinates: 38°30′N 70°45′E
- Country: Tajikistan
- Region: Gorno-Badakhshan Autonomous Region
- Capital: Qal'ai Khumb

Area
  - Total: 2,824.5 km^{2} (1,090.5 sq mi)
- Elevation: 4,484 m (14,711 ft)

Population (2020)
  - Total: 24,000
  - Density: 8.5/km^{2} (22/sq mi)
- Time zone: UTC+5 (TJT)
- Postal code: 736400
- Area code: +992 3552
- Official languages: Russian (Interethnic); Tajik (State)

Darvoz District (Russian: Дарвазский район, Tajik: Ноҳияи Дарвоз Nohiyai Darvoz) is a district in Tajikistan, located at the extreme north-west of the Gorno-Badakhshan Autonomous Region. It borders on Afghanistan to the south, along the Panj, and within Tajikistan on Khatlon Region to the west and on the Districts of Republican Subordination to the north. Its administrative capital is Qal'ai Khumb. The population of Darvoz district is 24,000 (1 January 2020 estimate). The district was historically part of the Darvaz principality, a semi-independent statelet ruled by a mir.

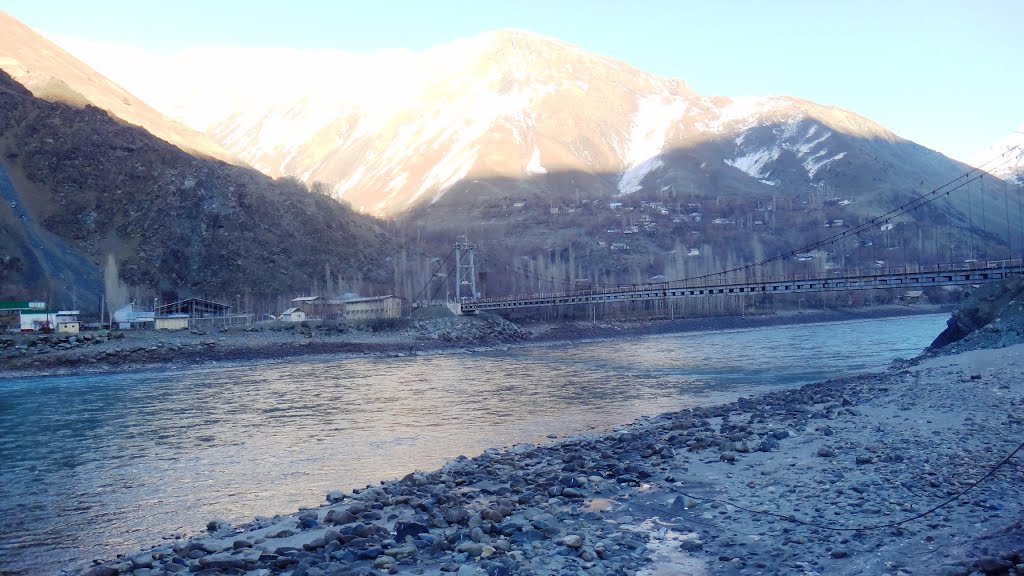
Friendship bridge between Afghanistan and Tajikistan in Region Darwaz-Darvoz, * Qal'ai Khumb, *Nusay.

== Administrative divisions ==
The district has an area of about 2,800 km^{2} (1,000 sq mi) and is divided administratively into four jamoats. They are as follows:

Jamoat	Population (Jan. 2015)
Nulvand	4,025
Qal'ai Khumb	8,366
Saghirdasht	5,420
Vishkharv	3,637

== See also ==
- Darvaz (region)
- Darwaz District
