= John Wood (explorer) =

Scottish naval officer, surveyor, cartographer and explorer (1812–1871)

John Wood (1812 – 14 November 1871) was a Scottish naval officer, surveyor, cartographer and explorer, principally remembered for his exploration of central Asia.

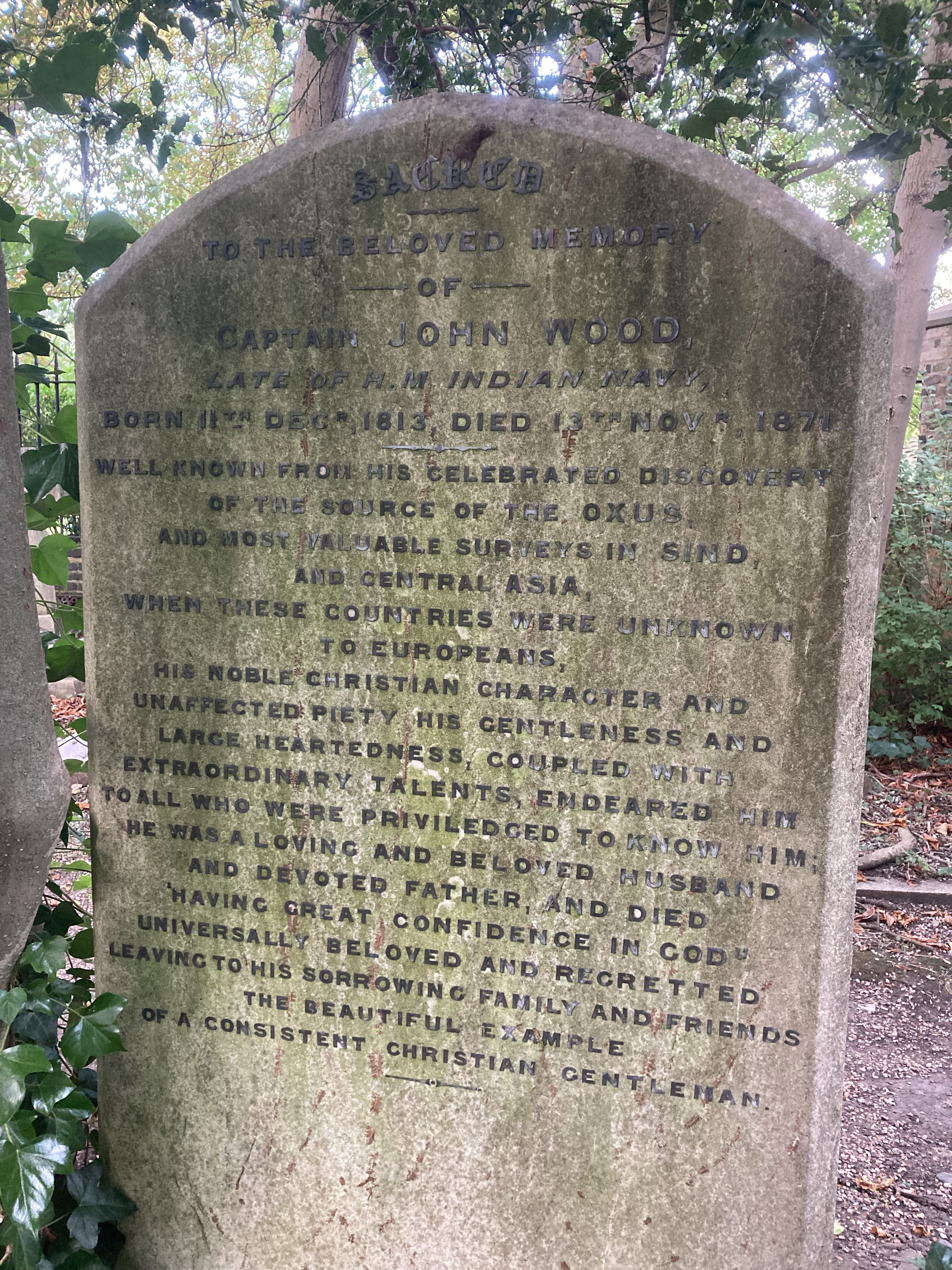
Grave of Captain John Wood in Highgate Cemetery

== Biography ==
Wood was born in Perth, Scotland. After schooling at Perth Academy, he joined the British Indian Navy, was made a Lieutenant, and soon demonstrated a flair for surveying. Many of the maps of southern Asia which he compiled remained standard for the rest of the 19th century.

In 1835, aged twenty-two, he commanded the first steamboat to paddle up the Indus River and surveyed the river as he went. In 1838, he led an expedition that found one of the River Oxus's sources in central Asia. The Royal Geographical Society recognised his work by awarding him their Patron's Medal in 1841.

After his central Asian explorations, Wood spent a year in Wellington, New Zealand, before moving back to India and establishing himself in Sind, a northern Indian province that is now part of Pakistan. In 1871, he decided to return to Britain, but before leaving made one final trip to Shimla in the Punjab, where he fell ill. He nonetheless embarked on the voyage home, but died only two weeks after his arrival, on 14 November. His travels were published in 1872.

He is buried on the eastern side of Highgate Cemetery.

== Bibliography ==
- John Wood
  - Narrative of a Journey to the Source of the River Oxus, London: John Murray, 1841
  - Twelve Months in Wellington, London: Pelham Richardson, 1843
