= Tajik–Afghan bridge at Tem-Demogan =

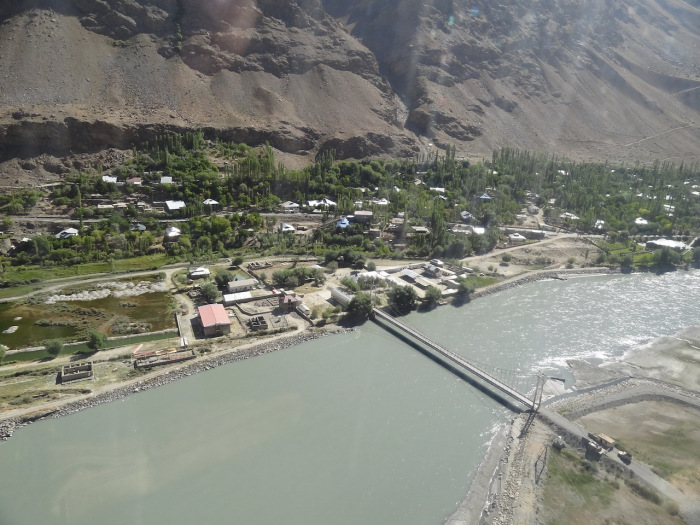
- Friendship bridge between Afghanistan and Tajikistan Across the Panj river in Region shughnon-shughnan
- Coordinates: 37°31′41″N 71°30′13″E
- Carries: Commercial and passenger vehicles up to 25 metric tonnes
- Crosses: Panj River
- Locale: Shughnon, Shughnan, Tajikistan
- Official name: Афгано-таджикский мост (Тем—Демоган) پل افغانستان-تاجیکستان در تم-دموگان

Characteristics
- Design: Suspension bridge
- Total length: 135 metres
- Width: 3.5 metres

History
- Opened: 3 November 2002

Location
- Interactive map of Tajik–Afghan bridge at Tem-Demogan

The Tajik–Afghan bridge at Tem-Demogan was opened on 3 November 2002. It spans the Panj River. It was the first of four bridges planned for construction with the assistance of the Aga Khan Foundation.

Tem is a microdistrict of Khorugh, in Gorno-Badakhshan Autonomous Province, Tajikistan, which is very sparsely settled. Many of the inhabitants are Ismaili Muslims, followers of the Aga Khan.

Demogan is a location in Afghanistan.

The bridge cost $400,000.

== See also ==
- Tajikistan–Afghanistan bridge at Panji Poyon
- Tajik–Afghan Friendship Bridge
