= Tajik–Afghan Friendship Bridge =

Tajikistan-Afghanistan Friendship Bridge In Darwaz region
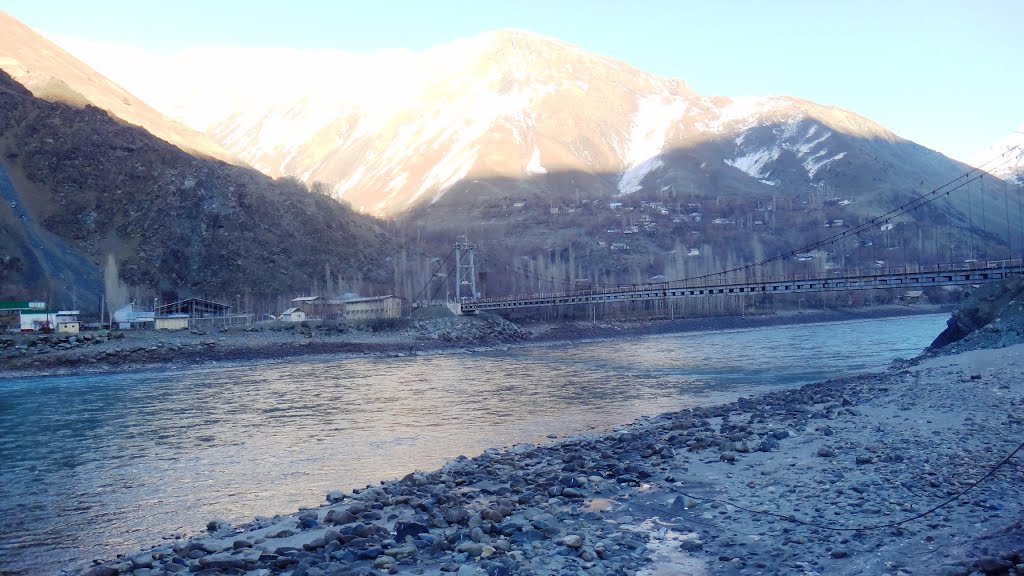
- Coordinates: 38°27′N 70°50′E
- Carries: Commercial and passenger vehicles up to 25 metric tonnes
- Crosses: Panj River
- Locale: Darvaz; Tajikistan

Characteristics
- Design: Suspension bridge
- Total length: 135 metres
- Width: 3.5 metres

History
- Opened: 6 July 2004

Location
- Interactive map of Tajikistan-Afghanistan Friendship Bridge In Darwaz region

The Tajikistan–Afghanistan Friendship Bridge (Russian: Мост дружбы) connects the two banks of Darvaz region across the Panj River (further downstream known as Amu Darya) separating Tajikistan and Afghanistan, at the town of Qal'ai Khumb. It was opened on 6 July 2004.

== Overview ==
Inaugurated by Tajikistan's President Emomali Rahmon, Afghanistan's Vice-President Nematullah Shahrani and Imam Aga Khan in July, 2004, the bridge was built at a cost of US$500,000 by the Aga Khan Development Network (AKDN) with collaborative support from the governments of the United States and Norway. It was the second of a series of bridges being built by the AKDN along the Panj River between Tajikistan and Afghanistan. (The Amu Darya begins at the junction of the Panj and Vakhsh rivers.)

The 135-metre-long suspension bridge has a single track 3.5 metres wide and a carrying capacity of 25 metric tonnes. It carries both commercial and passenger traffic and represents a permanent overland link between the two countries.

== Other Tajikistan-Afghanistan bridges ==
The first bridge crossing the Tajik-Afghan border was opened in November 2002, connecting Tem in Tajikistan and Demogan in Afghanistan. It too was constructed with assistance from the Aga Khan Foundation.

An additional bridge, connecting Tajikistan and Afghanistan, spanning the Panj river, at Panji Poyon (Nizhni Pyanj), was opened on 26 August 2007.

There are plans to span the border with an additional bridge, spanning the Panj river, in Gorno Badakhshan's Khumroghi area near Vanj.

== See also ==
- Tajik–Afghan bridge at Panji Poyon
- Tajik–Afghan bridge at Tem-Demogan
- List of international bridges
