= Tajik–Afghan bridge at Panji Poyon =

Афгано-таджикский мост (Нижний Пяндж) پُل دوستى افغانستان - تاجكستان (فارسى)
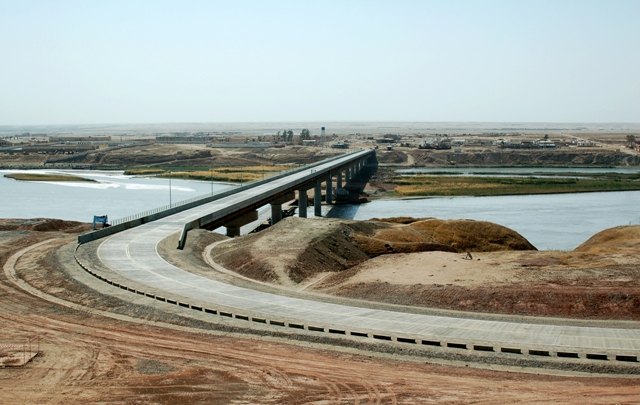
- Coordinates: 37.1946°N 68.6053°E
- Crosses: Panj River
- Locale: Panji Poyon (alternatively Nizhni-Pyanj)

Characteristics
- Design: Girder bridge
- Total length: 672 metres (2,205 ft)
- Width: 11.6 metres (38 ft)

History
- Opened: 2007-08-26

Location
- Interactive map of Афгано-таджикский мост (Нижний Пяндж) پُل دوستى افغانستان - تاجكستان (فارسى)

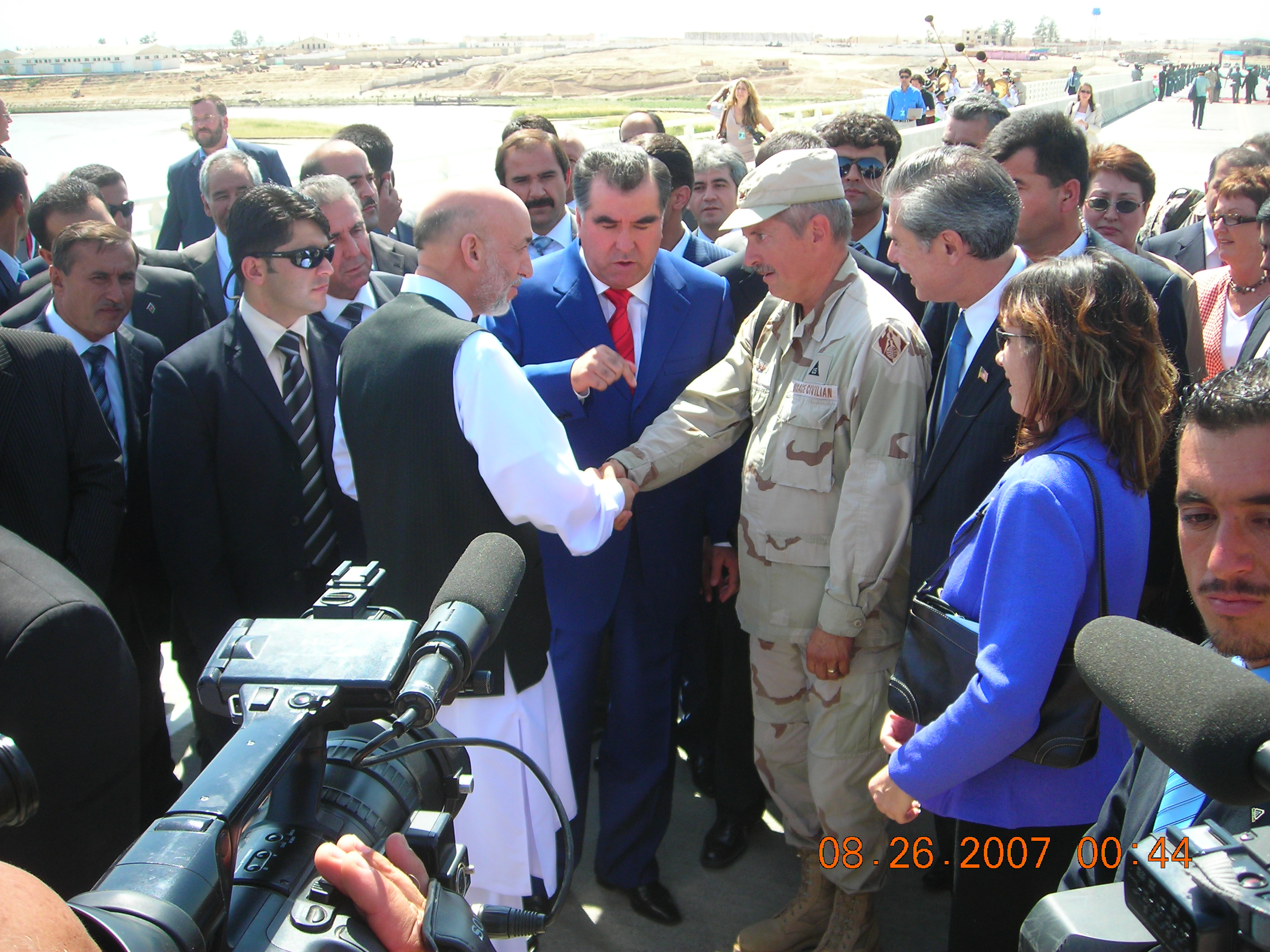
Opening Ceremony of Afghan-Tajik Bridge

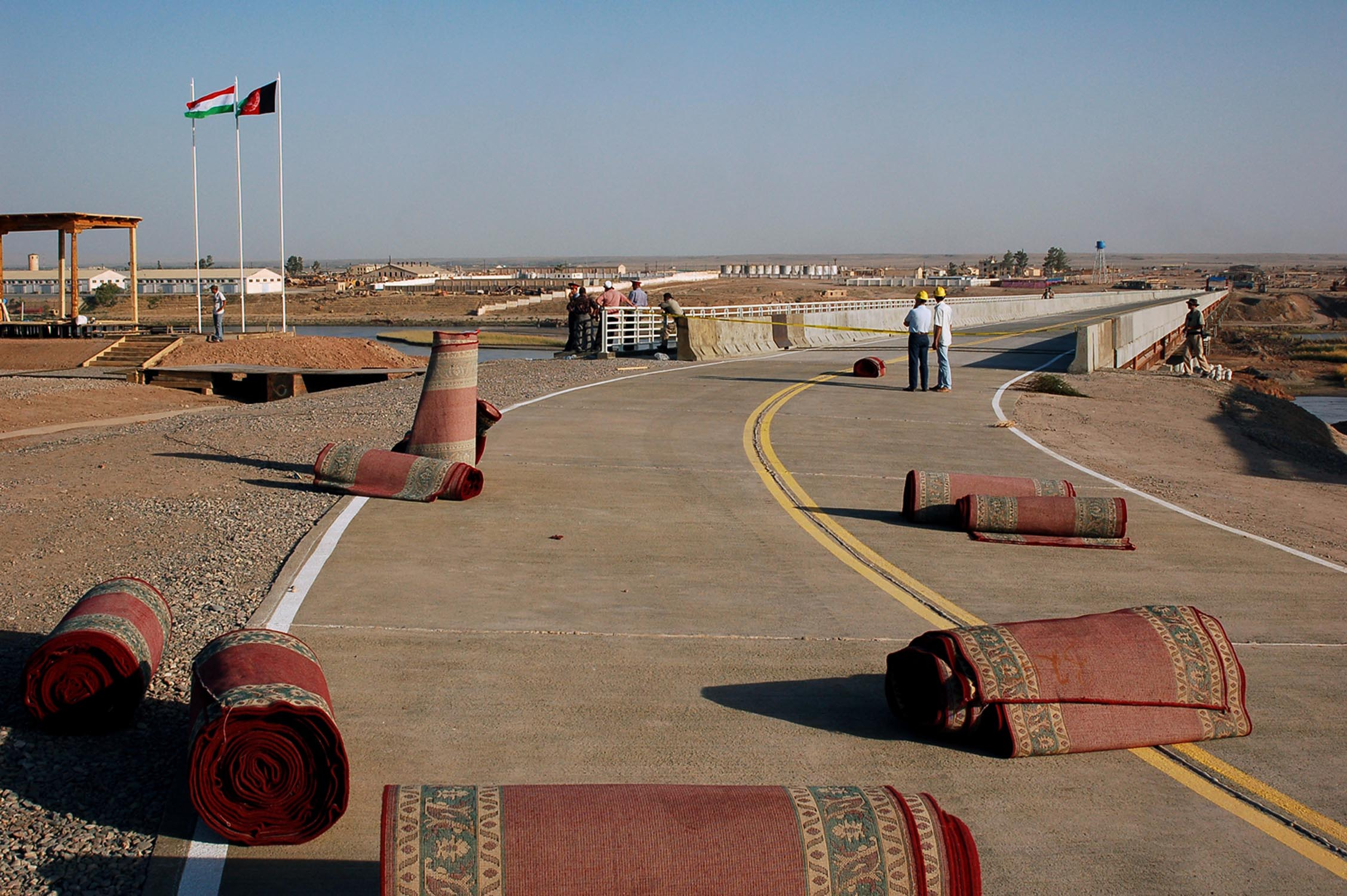
Preparation of Opening Ceremony of Afghan-Tajik Bridge

The Tajikistan-Afghanistan bridge spanning the Panj River between Panji Poyon (or Nizhniy Pyandzh), Tajikistan and Sherkhan Bandar, Afghanistan was opened on 26 August 2007. The two-lane bridge is 672 metres (2,205 feet) long and 11.6 metres (38 feet) wide. It cost approximately $40 million, financed by the US Army Corps of Engineers and was designed and constructed by Italian company Rizzani de Eccher S.p.A. The Tajik President Emomali Rahmon and Afghan President Hamid Karzai were joined by US Secretary of Commerce Carlos Gutierrez at the opening ceremony.

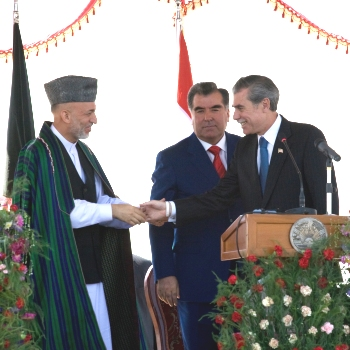
Tajik President Emomali Rahmon, Afghan President Hamid Karzai, and U.S. Secretary of Commerce Carlos Gutierrez at the 2007 dedication ceremony of the bridge.

== See also ==
- Tajik–Afghan bridge at Tem-Demogan
- Tajik–Afghan Friendship Bridge
