= Panj (river) =

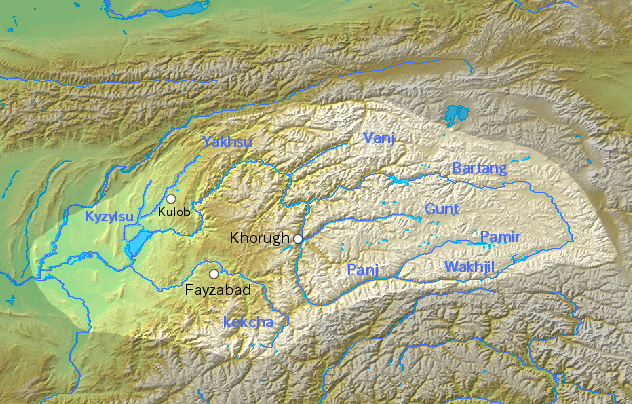
- The Panj river forms much of the border between Tajikistan and Afghanistan

Location
- Countries: Afghanistan and Tajikistan

Physical characteristics
- Source
  - location: confluence of Pamir and Wakhan rivers
- Mouth: Amu Darya
  - coordinates: 37°06′39″N 68°18′53″E
- Length: 921 km (572 mi)
- Basin size: 114,000 km^{2} (44,000 sq mi)
- Discharge
  - average: 1,000 m^{3}/s (35,315 cu ft/s)

Basin features
- Progression: Amu Darya→ Aral Sea

Ramsar Wetland
- Official name: Lower part of Pyandj River
- Designated: 18 July 2001
- Reference no.: 1084

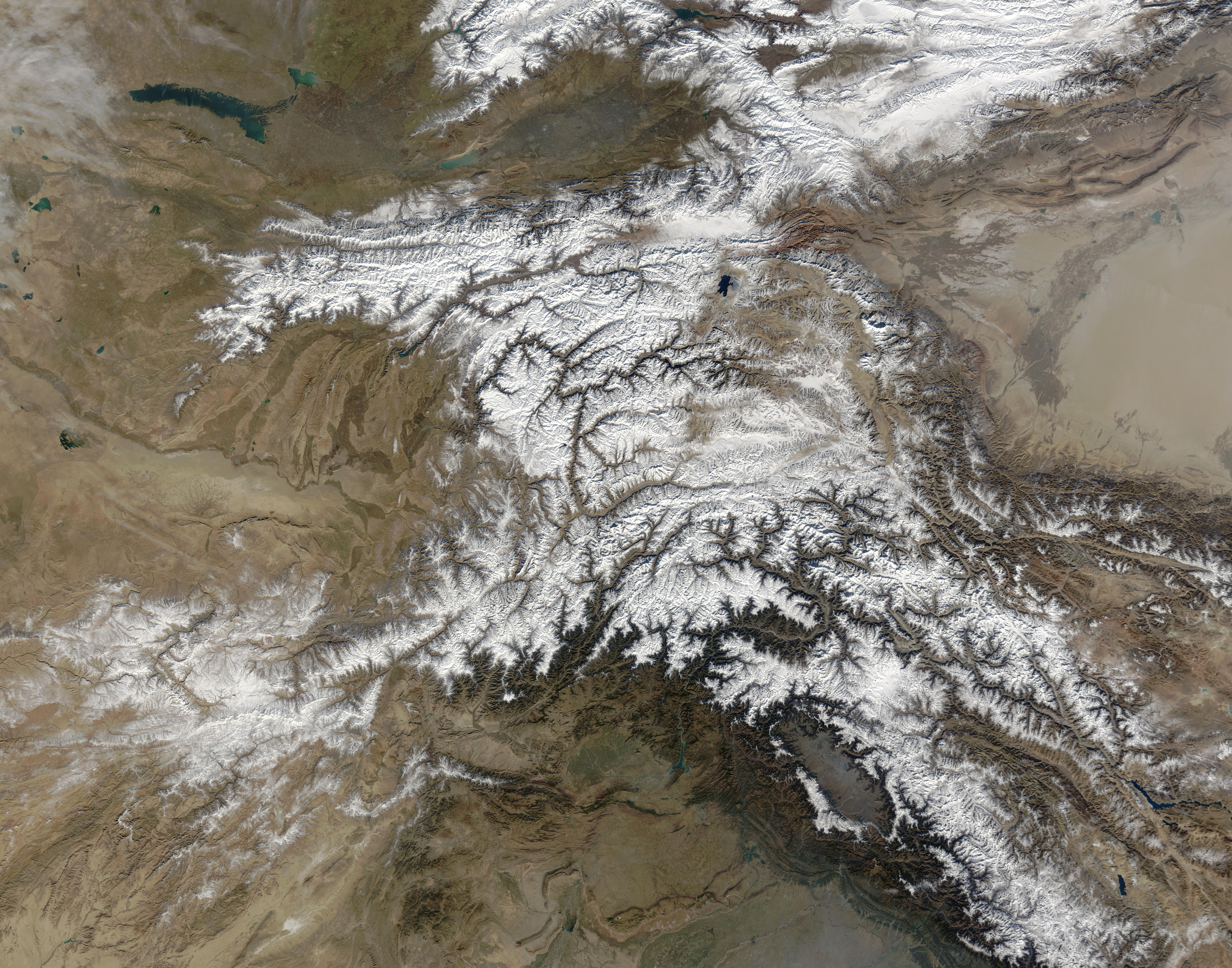
The Panj River from space

The Panj, (Note: English: /ˈpændʒ/, US also /ˈpɑːndʒ/; Pashto: پنج, romanized: Panj, pronounced [pandʒ]; Dari: پنج, romanized: Panj, pronounced [pʰandʒ]; lit. 'Five'; Tajik: Панҷ, romanized: Panj, arabized: پنج, hebraized: פנג׳, pronounced [pʰandʒ]; lit. 'Five'; Russian: Пяндж, romanized: Pjandž, pronounced [pʲæntʂ]) traditionally known as the Ochus River, is a river in Afghanistan and Tajikistan and a tributary of the Amu Darya. The river is 921 km (572 mi) long and has a basin area of 114,000 km^{2} (44,000 mi^{2}). It forms a considerable part of the Afghanistan–Tajikistan border.

The river is formed by the confluence of the Pamir River and the Wakhan River near the village of Qala-i-Panjah in the Wakhan District of Badakhshan Province in Afghanistan. From there, it flows westwards and marks part of the Afghanistan–Tajikistan border. After passing the city of Khorog, capital of the Gorno-Badakhshan Autonomous Region of Tajikistan, it receives water from one of its main tributaries, the Bartang River. It then turns towards the southwest, before joining the Vakhsh River and forming the greatest river of Central Asia, the Amu Darya. The Panj played an important role during Soviet era, and was a strategic river during the Soviet military operations in Afghanistan in the 1980s.

== Water consumption ==
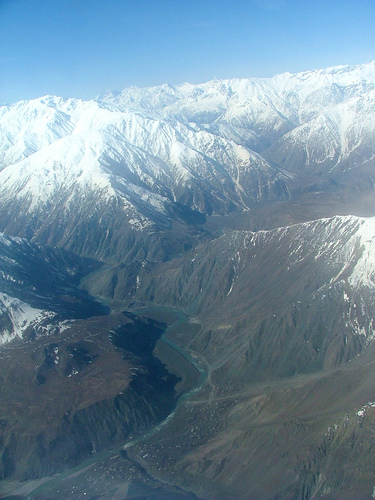
The Panj near Kevron, on the Afghanistan–Tajikistan border

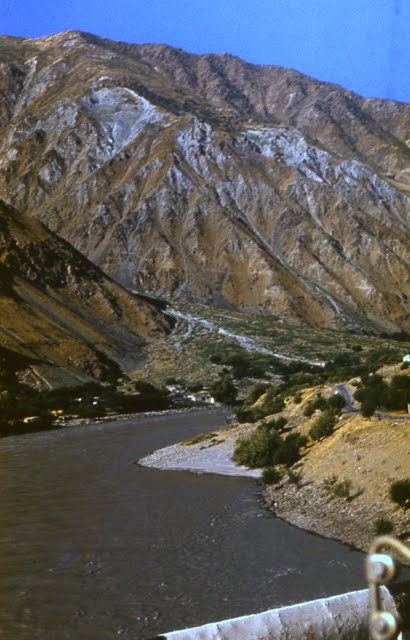
Panj river

A water treaty between the Soviet Union and Afghanistan was signed in 1946, allows Afghanistan to draw 9 million cubic metres of water a year from the Panj. It currently draws only 2 million cubic metres of water. According to the Panj River Basin Project, environmental damage could be expected if Afghanistan drew the entire amount of allocated water from the river under the treaty.

== Bridges ==
- Afghanistan-Tajikistan Bridge: A highway bridge was built over the river between Tajikistan and Afghanistan at Nizhnii Panj. The contract was awarded in May 2005 and the construction of the bridge began in Jan 2006 and was completed in August 2007. Funding was provided by the United States, amounting to US$37 million, and the construction was done by an Italian General Construction company Rizzani de Eccher S.p.A. under the ownership of US Army Corps of Engineers. The bridge replaced a barge that could transport only 60 cars a day and which was unusable many months in the year due to strong currents in the river. It was reported in 2009 that this facilitates the heroin trade.
- Another bridge was built at the confluence with the Gunt River at Khorog in 2003.
- A bridge exists at Langar, which may still be closed.

The Aga Khan Development Network has been engaged in a project to build a series of three bridges across the Panj River between Tajikistan and Afghanistan.

- The first of these bridges, connecting Tem on the Tajik side with Demogan on the Afghan side, was inaugurated by Tajikistan's President Emomali Rahmonov, Afghanistan's Vice-President Hedayat Amin Arsala and His Highness the Aga Khan in November, 2002.
- This was followed by the inauguration of the Tajik-Afghan Friendship Bridge at Darwaz in July, 2004,
- The Ishkashim bridge between Ishkashim, Afghanistan and Ishkashim, Tajikistan was inaugurated in October, 2006.

== See also ==
- List of rivers of Afghanistan
- Urta Tagay Island
