= Wakhan (disambiguation) =

Wakhan is a mountainous and rugged part of the Pamir and Karakoram regions of Afghanistan and Tajikistan.

Wakhan may also refer to:

- Wakhan Corridor
- Wakhan River
- Wakhan District
- Wakhan Mirdom
- Wakhan National Park
- Wakhan Front
- Wakhan Range

== See also ==
- Wakhi (disambiguation)
