= Wakhan Corridor =

Narrow strip of land in Afghanistan

Coordinates: 37°N 73°E

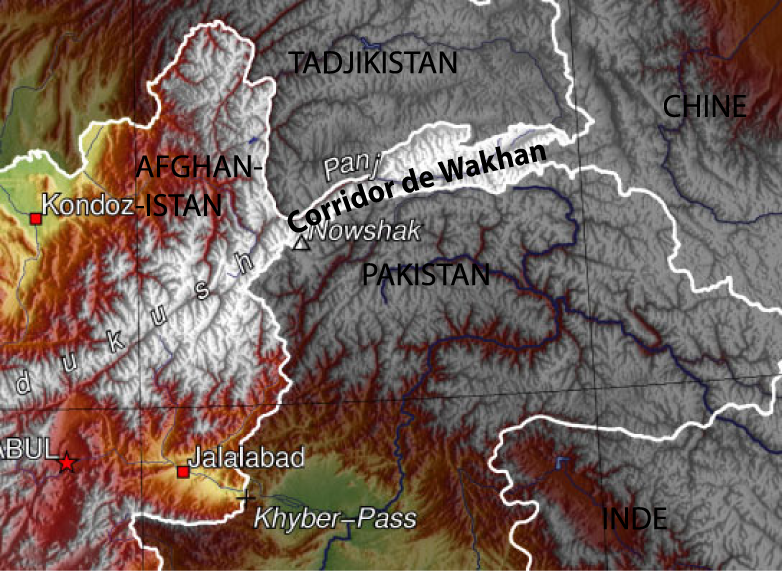
- Wakhan Corridor

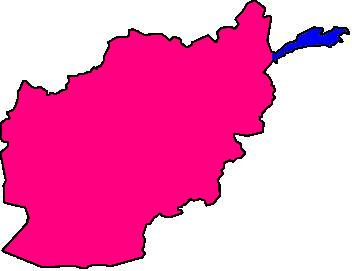

Chinese name
- Simplified Chinese: 瓦罕走廊
- Traditional Chinese: 瓦罕走廊
- Literal meaning: Wakhan Corridor
Transcriptions
Standard Mandarin
- Hanyu Pinyin: Wǎhǎn Zǒuláng
- IPA: [wàxàn tsòʊlǎŋ]
Yue: Cantonese
- Jyutping: Ngaa^{5}Hon^{2}Zau^{2}Long^{4}

Alternative Chinese name
- Simplified Chinese: 阿富汗走廊
- Traditional Chinese: 阿富汗走廊
- Literal meaning: Afghan Corridor
Transcriptions
Standard Mandarin
- Hanyu Pinyin: Āfùhàn Zǒuláng
- IPA: [áfûxân tsòʊlǎŋ]
Yue: Cantonese
- Jyutping: Aa^{3}Fu^{3}Hon^{6} Zau^{2}Long^{4}

Second alternative Chinese name
- Simplified Chinese: 瓦罕帕米尔
- Traditional Chinese: 瓦罕帕米爾
- Literal meaning: Wakhan Pamir
Transcriptions
Standard Mandarin
- Hanyu Pinyin: Wǎhǎn Pàmǐ'ěr
- IPA: [wàxàn pʰâmìàɚ]
Yue: Cantonese
- Jyutping: Ngaa^{5}Hon^{2} Paak^{8}Mai^{5}Yi^{5}

Uyghur name
- Uyghur: ۋاخان كارىدورى

Pashto name
- Pashto: دهلېز واخان

Russian name
- Russian: Ваханский коридор

The Wakhan Corridor (Note: Dari: دالان واخان, romanized: Dālān-i Wāxān; Pashto: د واخان دهلېز, romanized: Da Vāxān Dahlīz; Urdu: واخان راہداری, romanized: Vāxān Rāhdārī; Tajik: Даҳлези Вахон, romanized: Dahlezi Vaxon; Russian: Ваханский коридор, romanized: Vakhanskiy koridor; Chinese: 瓦罕走廊; pinyin: Wǎ hǎn zǒuláng; Uyghur: ۋاخان كارىدورى, romanized: Vākān Kārīdorī) is a protruding strip of territory mainly in the Wakhan District of Badakhshan Province in northeastern Afghanistan. It begins east of Ishkashim District and stretches eastward to the Wakhjir Pass, which connects by road Afghanistan with the Xinjiang Uygur Autonomous Region of China. The strip narrowly separates Gorno-Badakhshan in Tajikistan from Khyber Pakhtunkhwa and Gilgit-Baltistan in Pakistan. This high mountain valley, part of the wider Wakhan region, rises to a maximum altitude of 4,923 m (16,152 ft), and serves as the source of both the Panj and Pamir rivers, which converge to form the larger Amu Darya River. A trade route has traversed the valley for centuries, facilitating the movement of travelers to and from East, South, and Central Asia.

The corridor was formed out of the Wakhan Mirdom after the signing of the 1893 Durand Line Agreement and the 1895 Pamir Boundary Commission protocols, so that the Russian Turkestan dominion, now Tajikistan, would not touch British dominion, now Pakistan. This agreement also created the Durand Line, which today forms the border between Pakistan and Afghanistan. The last Mir of Wakhan fled with a quarter of Wakhi population to Chitral, whose ruler settled the refugees in Ishkoman; many Wakhis were also forced to migrate to Hunza and Sarikol. Its eastern end bordered China's Xinjiang region, then claimed by the Qing dynasty.

As of 2024, Afghanistan's Wakhan District has an estimated population of 18,000 residents. The northern part of the Wakhan, populated by the Wakhi, Pamiri and Kyrgyz peoples, is also referred to as the Pamir. The closest major airport is Fayzabad Airport in the city of Fayzabad to the west, which is accessible by a road network.

== Geography ==
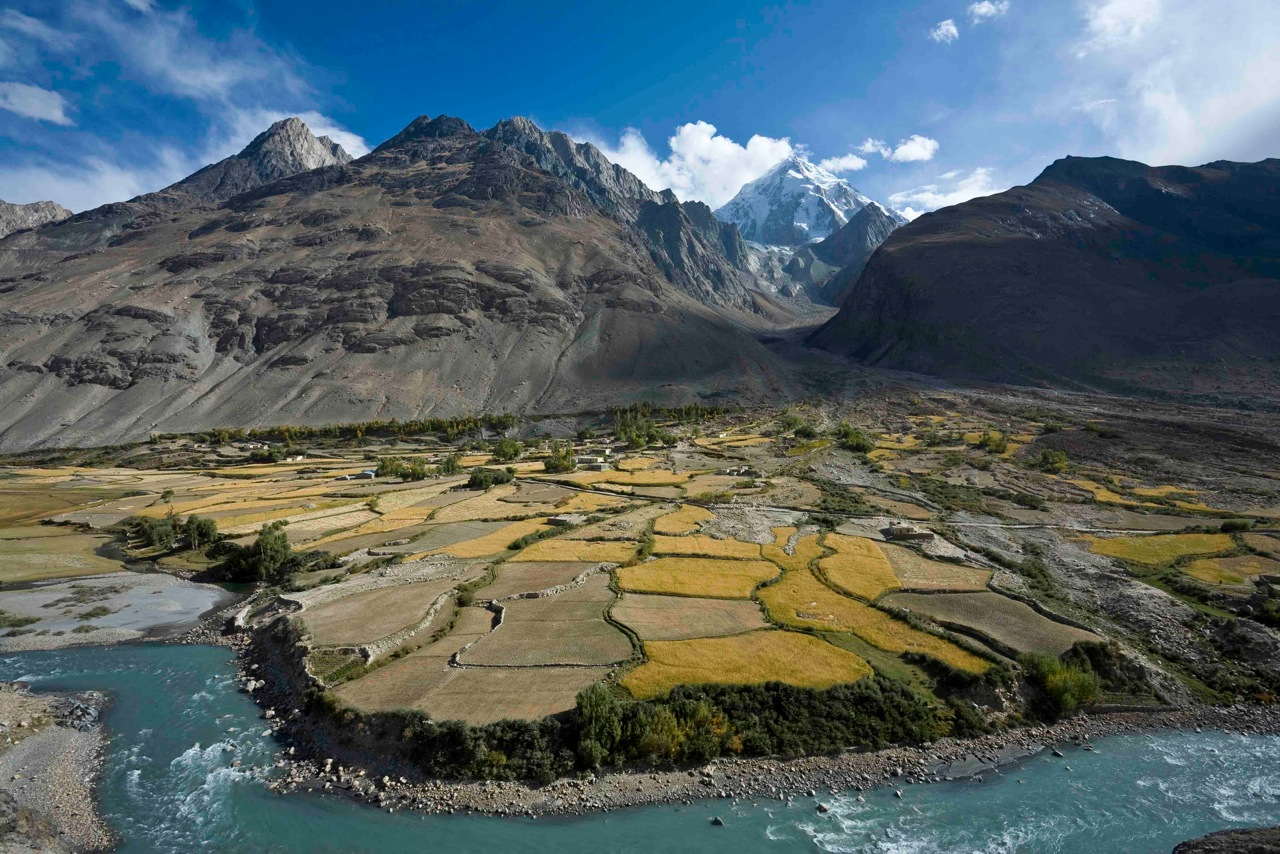
Floodplains in the Wakhan Corridor

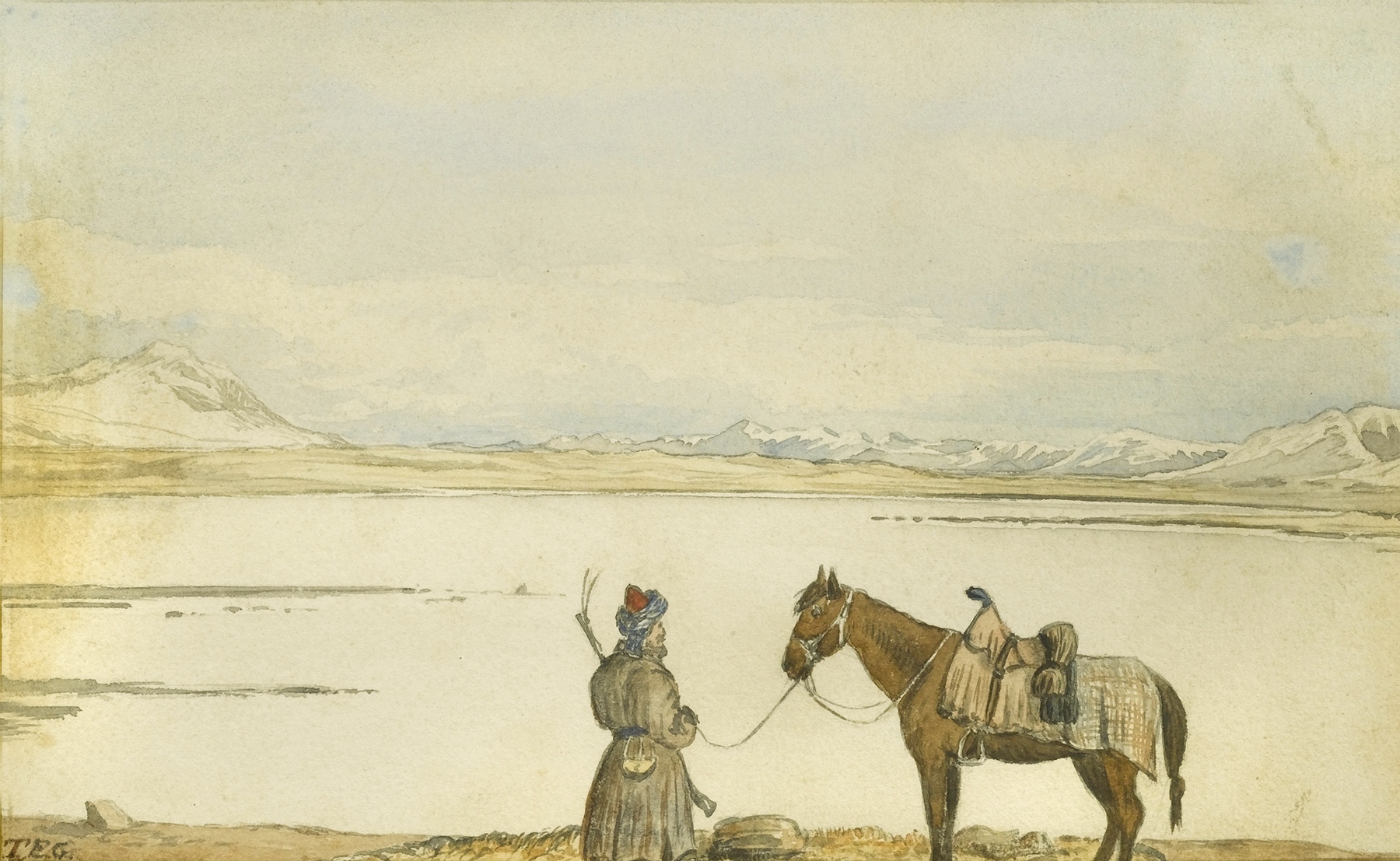
Lake Victoria, the Great Pamir, 2 May 1874, watercolour by Thomas Edward Gordon

At its western entrance, near the Afghan town of Ishkashim, the corridor is 18 km (11 mi) wide. The western third of the corridor varies in width (13–30 km (8–19 mi)) and widens to 65 km (40 mi) in the central Wakhan. At its eastern end, the corridor forks into two prongs that wrap around a salient of Chinese territory, forming the 92 km (57 mi) boundary between the two countries. The Wakhjir Pass on the Afghanistan–China border, which is the easternmost point on the southeastern prong, is about 300 km (190 mi) from Ishkashim. The easternmost point of the northeastern prong is a nameless wilderness about 350 km (220 mi) from Ishkashim. On the Chinese side of the border is the Tashkurgan Tajik Autonomous County of Xinjiang Uyghur Autonomous Region.

The northern border of the corridor is defined by the Pamir River and Lake Zorkul in the west, and the high peaks of the Pamir Mountains in the east. To the north is Tajikistan's Gorno-Badakhshan Autonomous Region. To the south, the corridor is bounded by the high mountains of the Hindu Kush and Karakoram. Along its southern flank, two mountain passes connect the corridor to neighboring regions. The Broghil Pass provides access to Pakistan's Khyber Pakhtunkhwa region, while the Irshad Pass links the corridor to Gilgit-Baltistan. The Dilisang Pass, which also connects to Gilgit-Baltistan, is disused.

The corridor is higher in the east than in the west; (the Wakhjir Pass is 4,923 m (16,152 ft) in elevation) and descends to about 3,037 m (9,964 ft) at Ishkashim. The Wakhjir River emerges from an ice cave on the Afghan side of the Wakhjir Pass and flows west, joining the Bozai Darya near the village of Bazai Gumbad to form the Wakhan River. The Wakhan River then joins the Pamir River near Qala-i-Panjah to form the Panj River, which then flows out of the Wakhan Corridor at Ishkashim.

The Chinese consider Chalachigu Valley, the valley east of Wakhjir Pass on the Chinese side connecting Taghdumbash Pamir, to be part of the Wakhan Corridor. The high mountain valley is about 100 km (60 mi) long. This valley, through which the Tashkurgan River flows, is generally about 3–5 km (2–3 mi) wide and less than 1 km (0.6 mi) at its narrowest point. This entire valley on the Chinese side is closed to visitors; however, local residents and herders from the area are permitted access.

== See also ==
- Little Pamir
- Great Pamir
- Mount Imeon
