= Fotur =

Fotur Fotūr Futūr, Pātūr
- Location in Afghanistan
- Coordinates: 36°41′10″N 71°38′24″E
- Country: Afghanistan
- Province: Badakhshan Province
- District: Wakhan
- Time zone: + 4.30

Fotur is a village on the left bank of the Ab-i-Panj river in Badakhshan Province in north-eastern Afghanistan.

It is historically important, as it is the settlement in Wakhan territory nearest to the approximately two-mile-away border with Ishkashim District. The population of the village was 436 in 2003, having increased from about 60 at the turn of the 20th century. Poplar trees grew plentifully.

Fotur is inhabited by Wakhi people.
