= Ab Gaj =

Ab Gaj Ābgach
- Location in Afghanistan
- Coordinates: 36°58′59″N 72°42′0″E
- Country: Afghanistan
- Province: Badakhshan Province
- District: Wakhan
- Time zone: + 4.30

Ab Gaj (or Abgach) is a village in Badakhshan Province in north-eastern Afghanistan. It is on the left bank of the Ab-i-Wakhan about a mile upstream of the meeting of that river and the Amu Darya, and about ten miles southeast of Kala Panja.

Ab Gaj is inhabited by Wakhi people. The population of the village (2003) is 342.
