= Sakar Sar =

Mountain in Afghanistan/Pakistan

- Location within Pakistan Location within Gilgit Baltistan

Highest point
- Elevation: 6,272 m (20,577 ft)
- Coordinates: 36°53′42″N 74°14′30″E

Geography
- Parent range: Karakoram

Climbing
- First ascent: August 13, 1999 by a Japanese team

Sakar Sar is a mountain peak located at 6,272 metres (20,577 ft) above sea level. It lies in the Hindu Kush-Karakoram, in part in the Gilgit-Baltistan region of Pakistan and in part in Afghanistan's Wakhan Corridor.

The first successful ascent was completed by a Japanese team in August 1999.

== Location ==
Sakar Sar is located 9 km east of the Irshad Pass on the watershed between Wachandarja in the north and Chapursan in the south. The dominance reference point is a 6,610-metre high mountain in the Karakoram, located 2.26 km east of the Koz Sar (6,677 m) . Also, a few km away is Dilisang Pass, a historic and disused cross-border trading route connecting Kyrgyz people and Wakhi people settlements.

== First ascent ==
On August 13, 1999, a Japanese team consisting of Akira Miyazawa, Makoto Ishikawa, Kanji Kamei, and Teruaki Suzuki and two porters Alam jan Dario and Afzal Baig reached the summit.
