= Qazideh =

- Location in Afghanistan
- Coordinates: 36°40′12″N 71°46′3″E
- Country: Afghanistan
- Province: Badakhshan
- District: Wakhan
- Time zone: UTC+04:30 (Afghanistan Time)

Qazideh (Pashto: قاضي ده) is a village in the Wakhan District of Badakhshan Province in northeastern Afghanistan. It lies on the left bank of the Panj River, approximately 20 km (12 mi) from Ishkashim. The towns of Khandud and Qala-i-Panjah are located to the northeast.

Qazideh is the trailhead for a 5-day round trip trek up a narrow side valley to the base camp for Noshaq.

The village is inhabited mostly by the Wakhi people. The population of the village in 2003 was 548.

== See also ==
- Tourism in Afghanistan
- Valleys of Afghanistan
