= Kharat =

Kharat Kharāt
- Location in Afghanistan
- Coordinates: 36°58′0″N 72°56′0″E
- Country: Afghanistan
- Province: Badakhshan Province
- District: Wakhan
- Time zone: + 4.30

Kharat is a village in Badakhshan Province in north-eastern Afghanistan. It is located about 28 miles southeast of Kala Panja.
