= Wakhi =

Wakhi may be:

- Wakhi language, the language of the majority of the people of Wakhan
- Wakhi people, an ethnic group in Wakhan, Afghanistan and the Northern Territories of Pakistan
- An adjectival form of Wakhan, the extreme northeastern region of Afghanistan that borders China, Tajikistan, and Pakistan
- wakhi hat, A type of traditional hat used by the Shoghnan people in Tajikistan, Afghanistan, Pakistan, and China.

== See also ==
- Wakhan (disambiguation)
