= Great Pamir =

Large U-shaped valley in the Wakhan

Coordinates: 37°24′N 73°37′E

The Great Pamir or Big Pamir (Note: Wakhi: Past Pamir; Kyrgyz: Чоң Памир, romanized: Chong Pamir; Persian: پامیر کلان, romanized: Pāmīr-e Kalān; Pashto: لوی پامیر) is a U-shaped, grassy valley (or pamir) in the eastern part of the Wakhan National Park, which itself is located in the Wakhan District of Badakhshan Province in northeastern Afghanistan. The Big Pamir and Little Pamir both make up the Pamir Mountains. The area is home to a diverse range of animals and has traditionally been used as summer pasture by Wakhi and Kyrgyz herders.

== Geography ==
The Great Pamir is part of the Pamir Mountains, consisting of the primary range of high mountains and the plateau at the western end of the Pamir Knot. It constitutes the eastern portion of the Wakhan Corridor, which is a narrow strip of Afghanistan's mountainous terrain situated between Pakistan and Tajikistan. The valley is 60 km (37 mi) long and bound to the north by the Southern Alichur Range and to the south by the Nicholas Range and the Wakhan Range. Lake Zorkol lies at the northern edge of the Great Pamir.

== Human and animal activity ==
Before 1895 the valley was under the jurisdiction of the Wakhan Mirdom, with its capital at Qala-i-Panjah. The Wakhi and Kyrgyz herders use the area for summer pasture. Side valleys support populations of Marco Polo sheep, snow leopard, ibex, and brown bear.

== National parks ==
The 57,700 ha (143,000-acre) Pamir-i-Buzurg Wildlife Reserve in Afghanistan contains an area of high mountains, within which the valleys of the Abakhan, Manjulak, Sargaz and Tulibai rivers flow into the Pamir River. In the south is the wide Wakhan River valley. The reserve has been designated an Important Bird Area (IBA) by BirdLife International because it supports populations of Himalayan snowcocks, Himalayan griffons, wallcreepers, white-winged redstarts, Altai accentors, brown accentors, white-winged snowfinches, great rosefinches, plain mountain finches, and Brandt's mountain finches.

== See also ==
- List of protected areas of Afghanistan
