= Wakhi hat =

A type of hat in the Pamirs (Tajikistan, Afghanistan, Pakistan, China)

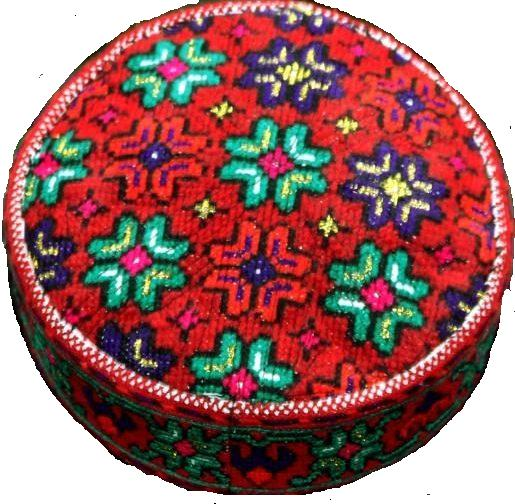
Wakhi taqin

Wakhi taqin (Wakhi: skid; Tajik: тоқии вахонӣ) is a traditional embroidered headwear worn in the clothing tradition of the Wakhi people in the Pamir region. In terms of its structure, motifs, and sewing techniques, it is regarded as a distinctive type of traditional headwear of the Wakhan region.

The Wakhi taqin is widespread in the Wakhan Valley and surrounding areas of Badakhshan. Examples of this headwear have also been documented among Wakhi communities living in neighboring countries; however, examples found in China and Pakistan differ in some respects from those commonly worn in Tajikistan, particularly in their form and decoration.

== Name ==
In the Wakhi language, the word skid is used to refer to a "hat" or "small cap". The word has been recorded in linguistic studies as one of the traditional terms for headwear in Wakhi.

The name skid in Wakhi has a history predating its present-day use. According to linguistic studies, the word came to be used at a relatively late period for the embroidered Wakhi cap and had previously referred to another type of headwear, including a tall, pointed cap.

The Wakhi word skid has been linguistically connected with the reconstructed Old Iranian form *skauδa-. This root has been compared with a number of terms for headwear in Iranian languages, including Avestan xaoδa, Old Persian xauda, Ossetian xud, Pashto xol, Yaghnobi xud/t, Munji xūla, and Shughni xɛwδ.

== History ==
Headwear was an important element of the traditional clothing of the peoples of the Western Pamirs. Historical and ethnographic sources indicate that various types of hats and other forms of headwear were used in the region according to season, gender, and occasion.

In the early 20th century, A. A. Bobrinsky recorded in Wakhan and the areas around the Panj River a small, flat cap that was made of white cotton yarn and worn during summer. He also reported that another woolen cap known as "pakul" or "pakol" was worn during winter and cold weather, while Wakhi women wore a small, flat cap beneath a headscarf.

Traditional Tajik caps have differed between regions in their shape, colors, and embroidered designs, and these regional differences sometimes made it possible to identify the geographical origin of the wearer. The Wakhi taqin developed its own distinctive characteristics within this regional diversity.

The oldest examples of embroidered Wakhi taqin designs examined in studies of the headwear are preserved in museum collections and have been dated to the middle of the 19th century. These examples demonstrate the diversity of motifs and the characteristics of traditional cap design.

== Structure ==
The Wakhi taqin consists of several parts. In traditional descriptions, the peripheral or forehead section of the cap is called raf, while its upper section is known as toysari or skidtor. These parts are prepared and embroidered separately and are then joined.

In a more detailed description, the components of the cap include the tora or upper section, raf, lining, pilta, shiroz, edging, and popak. The composition and dimensions of these elements may vary according to the individual example and method of manufacture. After the embroidery has been completed on the raf and toysari, the cap is reinforced from the lining side. In the example described in the study, seven layers of cotton fabric were used to thicken and strengthen the embroidered sections. Once the raf and toysari have been prepared, the two sections are manually joined. The final joining requires considerable sewing skill and is regarded as one of the specialized stages of making the cap.

== Fabric and thread ==
The traditional base of the raf is made of fine white cotton fabric, on which designs are embroidered according to a pattern. In some local descriptions, the white background is associated with concepts such as purity and cleanliness.

In earlier periods, cotton, silk, and woolen threads and fabrics were used in the production and decoration of the cap. In the contemporary period, synthetic threads and fabrics and other new materials have also been incorporated into Wakhi taqin production.

Some Wakhi artisans also use natural dyes to color silk threads. Pomegranate and onion skins are among the materials mentioned for this purpose.

== Sewing techniques ==
The Wakhi taqin is embroidered using two principal techniques: left-hand embroidery and embroidery based on a pattern or template. Left-hand embroidery is a more difficult technique that was more widespread during the Soviet period, while in the pattern-based method, a design is prepared in advance and then executed on the fabric.

In the pattern-based method, the design is first drawn, after which the individual units of the pattern are counted and transferred onto the cap according to a prescribed arrangement. This technique makes it possible to produce complex geometric designs.

In the left-hand technique, embroidery is carried out from the lining side. This method was more common in the past and was also widely used during the Soviet period.

The time required to make a cap depends on the production technique and the complexity of its design. A 2016 field report by Radio Free Europe/Radio Liberty stated that making a Wakhi cap could take approximately two to three months, depending on the complexity of the motifs. Another study of Wakhi headwear gives approximately one month for the preparation of a hand-embroidered example in the Wakhan Valley. The difference between this estimate and other reports may be related to differences in the type of cap, complexity of the design, and sewing technique.

== Motifs ==
The motifs of the Wakhi taqin include floral, geometric, and animal elements. Recorded traditional motifs include pepper, almond, pomegranate, leaves, buds, chains, roses, tulips, stars, crosses, spiral lines, and stylized animal forms.

Floral motifs such as three-leaf forms, wildflowers, roses, and tulips appear on Wakhi caps. These motifs vary in form and color and are not necessarily repeated in exactly the same way across different examples.

Within the decorative system of the Wakhi taqin, some floral motifs have been assigned symbolic meanings. Almond and pomegranate motifs have been associated with blessing, abundance, and prosperity, while pepper, tamur, and thorn-flower motifs have been used in some local beliefs as protection against the evil eye and supernatural forces.

== Symbolism ==
Some examples of the Wakhi taqin feature representations of the sun, floral motifs, crosses, the simurgh, and the peacock. Studies of the cap associate the sun with light and warmth; the simurgh and peacock with wisdom; floral branches with peace and beauty; and the cross with happiness.

In some symbolic interpretations, motifs found on the Wakhi taqin have been associated with water, earth, the sun, fire, and the crown. The sun motif has also been interpreted as representing the relationship between humans and nature.

Along the edge of the designs, a band known as yopkik has been described. It is likened to a water channel and is executed with green and red colors. Within the same decorative system, another element known as kingra, placed over the yopkik, has been associated with a crown and a mountain peak.

== Colors ==
Red, white, and green are among the traditional colors documented for the Wakhi taqin. More varied colors are also used in newer examples, while red occupies a particularly prominent position in Pamiri clothing traditions.

A Radio Free Europe/Radio Liberty field report also identifies red, pink, green, and yellow as characteristic colors of Wakhi caps and describes meanings associated with warmth, vitality, and nature.

== Use and transmission of skills ==
In the past, the making of Wakhi caps was practiced primarily among female artisans of the region, and the skills were passed from one generation to the next. In recent years, increasing demand for Wakhi caps has encouraged more young people to learn the craft.

Ethnographic reports also document the transmission of embroidery skills within families from an early age. In the handicraft traditions of Badakhshan, girls began participating in embroidery and knitting activities from around the age of 10 to 12.

In the contemporary period, Wakhi caps are used not only as cultural items but are also sold as handicrafts and souvenirs. Tourists visiting Ishkashim District and the Wakhan Valley are among the buyers of these products.

== Regional variations ==
Wakhi caps differ in form and decoration across the various countries where Wakhi communities live. Examples from China and Pakistan may differ from Tajik examples in the height and shape of the raf and in the types of motifs used; in some examples, animal motifs are more prominent.

Comparative research on Pamiri clothing indicates that clothing and headwear in the region have been influenced over time by contact among different communities and languages. These contacts are reflected in the naming, form, and development of different types of headwear.

In Wakhan, alongside local traditions, cultural contacts with surrounding regions have also influenced the development of clothing. Studies of clothing terminology and historical records indicate that the movement of cultural elements from the north and south over several centuries played a role in shaping the clothing traditions of the Western Pamirs.

== Wakhi taqin in contemporary culture ==
In 1998, the Ministry of Culture of Tajikistan, together with the Department of Culture of the Gorno-Badakhshan Autonomous Region, organized a competition to select the most beautiful Wakhi cap. Artisans from different parts of the region participated, and the cap made by Gulbegim Yogibekova from the village of Isor in Ishkashim District won first place.

In the contemporary period, the Wakhi taqin is presented as a recognizable element of Wakhan clothing culture, and its image also appears on the 20 somoni banknote of Tajikistan.

Contemporary production of Wakhi caps continues to incorporate new designs and materials. Some modern examples combine traditional motifs with elements such as the flag and map of Tajikistan.

Alongside traditional production, increased demand has led to the marketing of Wakhi caps as handicrafts. A 2016 Radio Free Europe/Radio Liberty report described the sale of these caps in Tajik markets and their purchase by foreign tourists.

== Traditional and contemporary status ==
In the contemporary period, the Wakhi taqin has retained two characteristics simultaneously: the use of traditional structures and motifs, and the incorporation of new designs and materials. As a result, newer examples may differ from traditional ones in their colors and decoration.

In the past, production of Wakhi caps was concentrated mainly among female artisans of the region, while increasing demand in recent years has encouraged greater participation by young people in learning and producing them.

== Cultural significance ==
The Wakhi taqin has been examined in ethnographic research as part of the decorative arts and traditional clothing of Wakhan. Its motifs, together with its structure and sewing techniques, form part of the distinctive characteristics of the region's textile and clothing arts.

Traditional embroidery and decorative motifs associated with the Wakhi taqin are not limited to the cap itself. Similar motifs have also been used on other items of traditional Wakhan clothing and accessories. Ethnographic sources record examples of these motifs on headbands, aprons, belts, socks, and gloves.

== Gallery ==
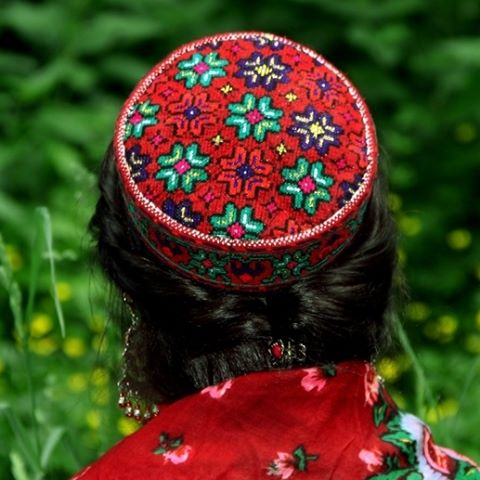
Wakhi taqin worn by a Wakhi girl

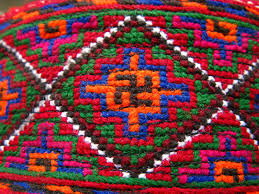
Swastika motif in the design of a Wakhi Tania

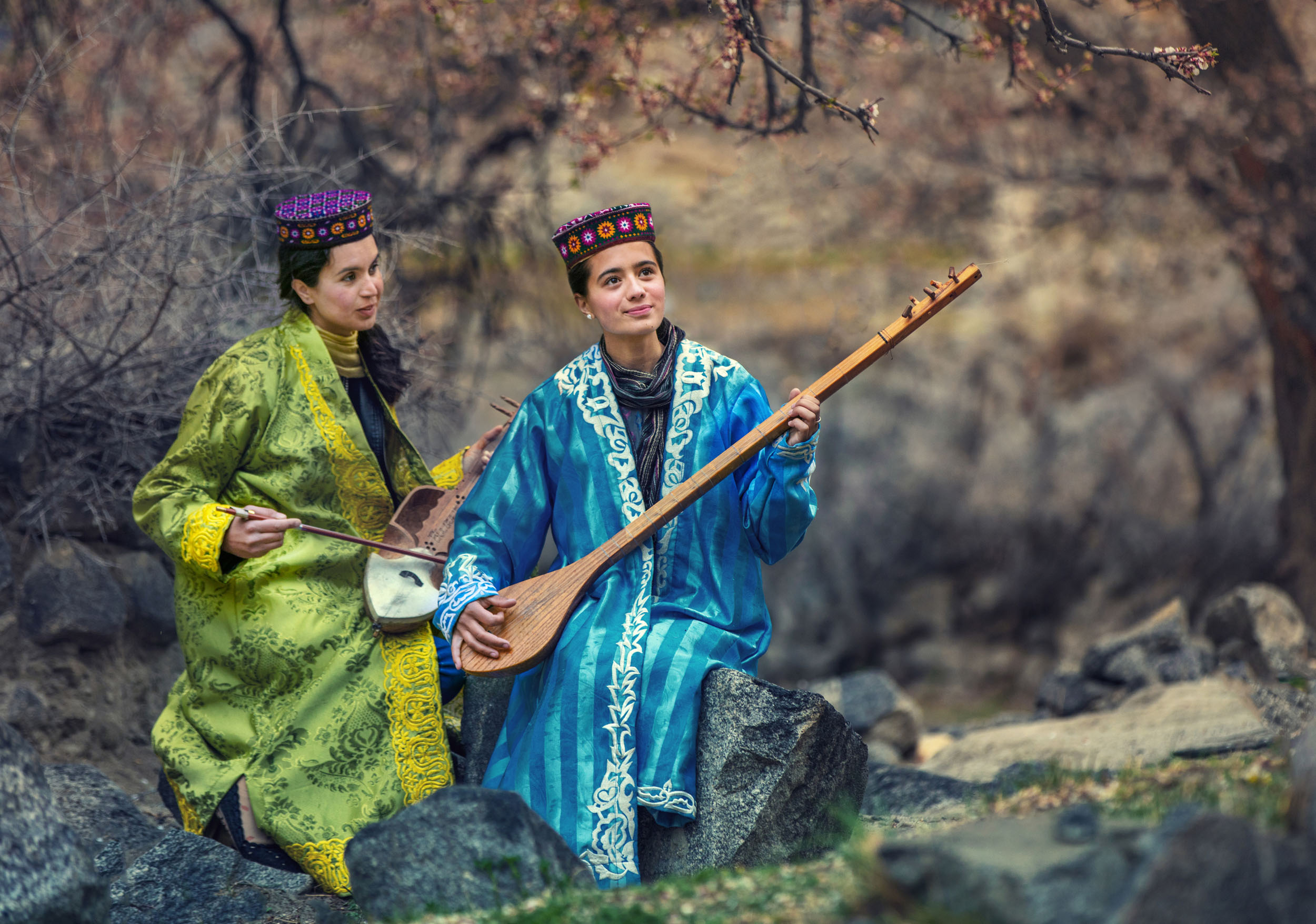
Wakhi girls from Pakistan

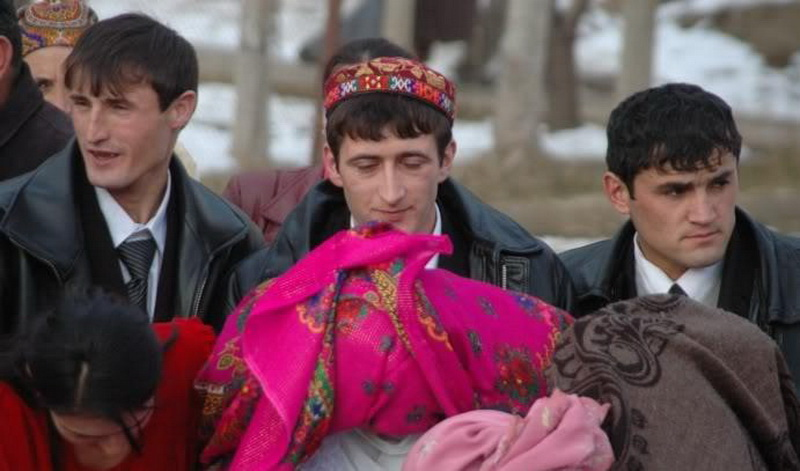
Wakhi taqin worn by Wakhi boys

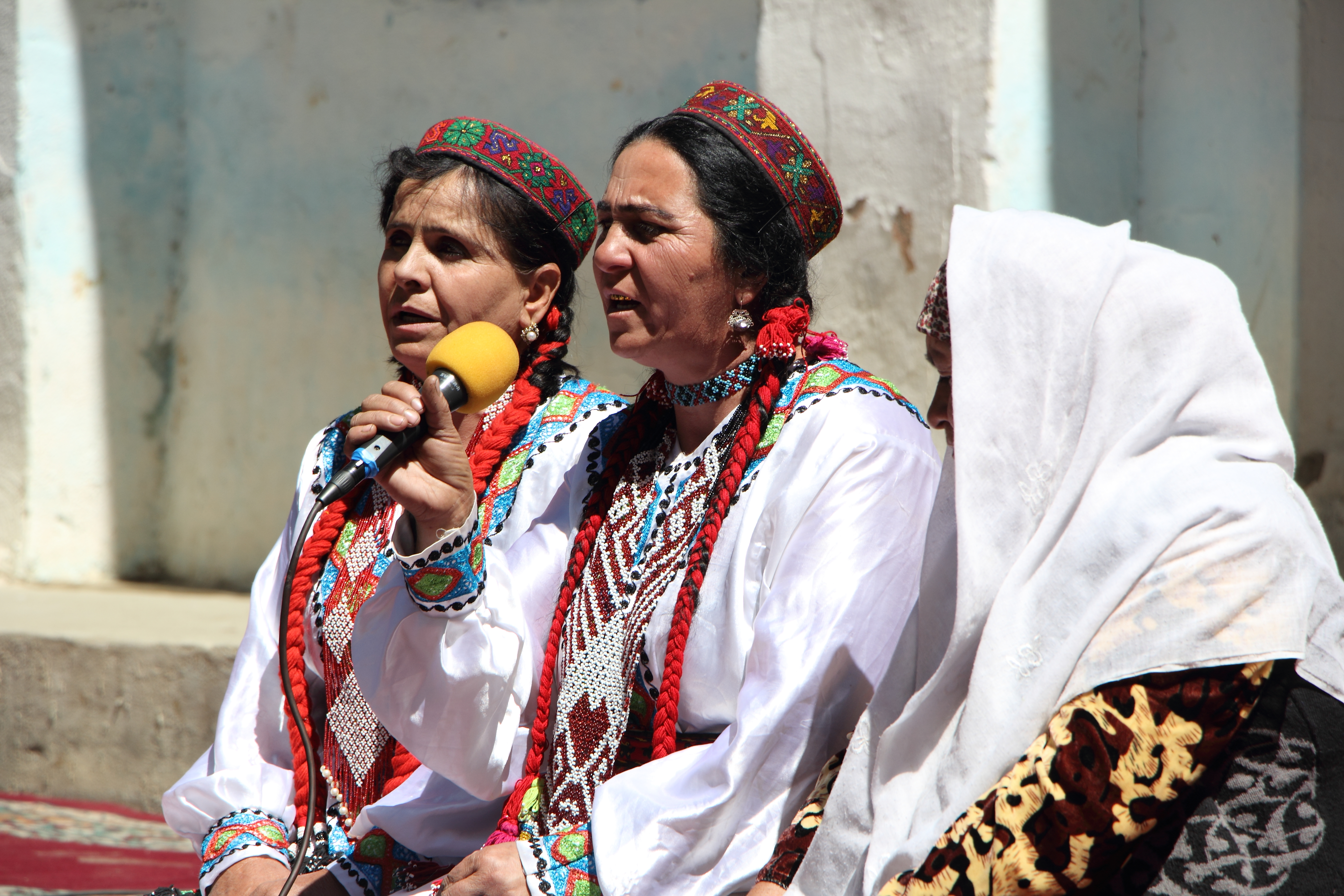
Wakhi taqin worn by Wakhi women
