= Ershad (disambiguation) =

Ershad is the transliteration of an Arabic given name meaning "universal guidance". Ershad also means "recite" in Urdu language.

== People ==
- Hussain Muhammad Ershad (1930–2019), President of Bangladesh during 1983-1990.
- Ershad Sikder (died 2004), Bangladeshi criminal.
- Ershad Yousefi (born 1981), Iranian football goalkeeper.

== Places ==
- Hosseiniye Ershad is a public library and venue in Tehran.
- Ershad Pass, a mountain pass in Hindukush mountain range

== Others ==
- Ministry of Culture and Islamic Guidance (Iran), also known as Ershad, is a censoring agency of the Iranian government
- Ershad ministry, 9th council of ministers of the government of Bangladesh
