= Chapursan =

Valley in Gilgit-Baltistan

Chipursan چپورسن
- Valley
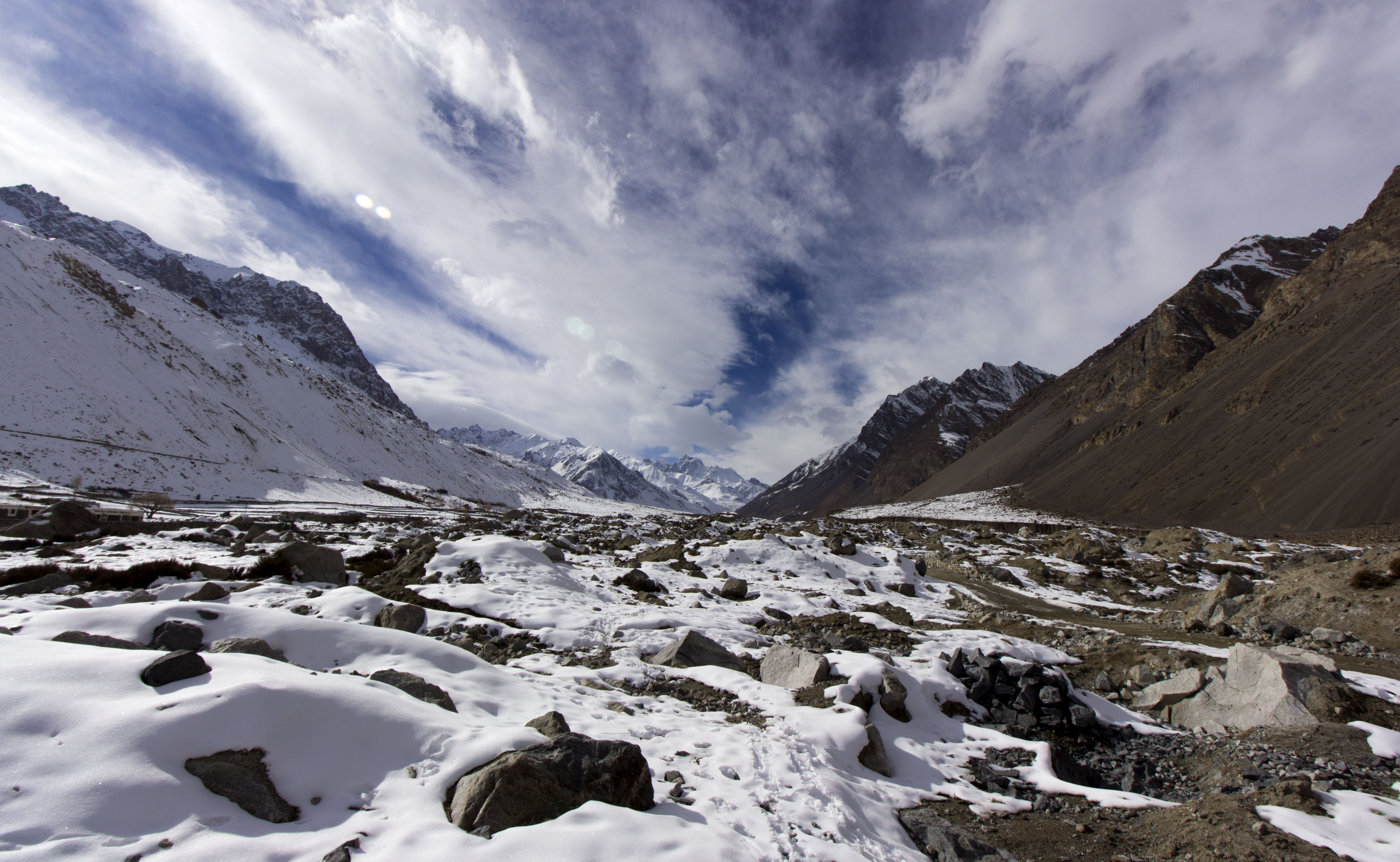

- Location within Gilgit Baltistan
- Coordinates: 36°44′N 74°44′E
- Country: Gilgit-Baltistan
- Division: Gilgit Division
- District: Hunza District
- Tehsil: Gojal

Population
  - Total: 3,000

Chipursan (Wakhi: چپورسن; also spelt Chipurson, Chiporson, Chaporsan, Chupurson) is a valley containing approximately eight scattered villages situated in the Gojal Tehsil of the Hunza District of Gilgit-Baltistan. It is located in the northern part of the country, close to the border with the Wakhan District of the Badakhshan Province of Afghanistan and the Xinjiang autonomous region of China. The valley is predominantly inhabited by ethnic Wakhis; the village of Raminj in this region is inhabited by ethnic Burushos. The valley's inhabitants largely adhere to the Isma'ili sect of Shia Islam. Chapurson hosts over 500 households with an estimated population of 3000 people.

== Geography ==
The Chipurson valley is above 3,000 meters (9,800 ft) from sea level, and the villages are Yarzerech, Raminj, Kirmin, Khill, Rashet, Sheresubz, Ispenj, Shetmerg and Zood Khun.

After Zood Khun pastures are Yashkuk, Kukchaizem, Biban Joi, Kohrben, Korkot, Joi Sam, Dainkut, Khudayar Alga, Kimkut and Baba Ghundi, a major shrine in the Hunza District which is visited by many all year round. Further ahead lie Yashwoshitk, Shipodkut, Pomiri (Pamiri), Pamir and more. All the names of villages and pastures are in Wakhi language.

The valley is full of peaks and passes. Passes include Irshad Pass between Pakistan and Afghanistan and Lupghar Pir Pass between Yeshkuk and Raminj village. Peaks include Sakar Sar, Kumpire Dior, Pamir Sar, Sarmaya Sar, Kuksar, and Lupghar Sar.

== Sites of interest ==
Chapursan Valley has historical places. like Yaskuk, Rovai Sam, Khumpir Dior, and the Shrine of Baba Ghundi.

Shrine of Baba Ghundi (Baba Ghundi Ziarat) in the Chuparsan Valley is the shrine of the famous Pir of Ghund who is celebrated in legend as the Sufi saint who brought Islam to the valley. The saint is not actually buried here. The former Mir of Hunza kept his herds of sheep and goats for grazing around here and used to visit the shrine every year. The people of Hunza Valley also revere the saint and it is said that children who are a problem for their parents have only to taste the mud from a stream near Baba Ghundi to become obedient and well behaved.

== Peaks, Passes and Glaciers of Chapurson Valley ==
Chapurson Valley Known for its rugged, high-altitude terrain, the valley is characterized by numerous towering peaks, challenging mountain passes, and extensive glaciers, forming a significant part of the Karakoram mountain range. The geography of Chapurson is dominated by its mountainous environment. Elevations range from approximately 3,700 meters (12,100 ft) at lower localities to over 7,000 meters (23,000 ft) at its highest peaks. The valleys are typically narrow, with steep slopes leading up to vast ice fields and rock faces.

=== Peaks ===
The Chapurson Valley is home to several prominent peaks, many of which exceed 6,000 meters (20,000 ft) in elevation. These peaks present significant challenges for mountaineers due to their technical difficulty and remote locations.

Notable Peaks of Chapurson
S.No.	Peak Name	Elevation (m)	Elevation (ft)	Notes
01	Kumpir Dior Sar	7168	23,517	Also known as Kampire Dior; one of the highest peaks in the region.
02	Pamir Sar	7016	23,018	located in the Karakoram range. Sometimes referred to as Pamiri Sar.
03	Kuksar	6943	22,779	Referred to as Kuk Sar is a 6,943m peak in the Karakoram range of the Himalayas
04	Kuk Sar II	6925	22,719	
05	Khuz Sar (Koz Sar)	6677	21,906	
06	Yishkuk Sar (Yashkuk Sar)	6668	21,877	A quiet American team has made the first ascent of Yashkuk Sar, a lonely 6,667m peak in Pakistan
07	Kumpire Doir Sar II	6572	21,562	
09	Sakar Sar	6272	20,577	Located 9 km east of the Irshad Pass on the watershed between Wachandarja in the north and Chapursan in the south
10	Yishkuk Sar II	6244	20,486	Yaskuk has two separate peaks, 6,667m Yashkuk Sar I and 6,244m Yashkuk Sar II.
11	Nadim Sar	6211	20,377	
12	Caboom Sar	6186	20,295	
13	Dehli Sangi-sar	6165	20,226	
14	Mamu Sar	6096	19,999	
15	Lupsuk Sar	6082	19,954	
16	Zood Khun Peak	6080	19,948	
17	Kutshkulin Sar	6074	19,928	
18	Constanzia Sar	5902	19,364	
19	Ghorhill Sar	5800	19,029	Referred to as Ghorhil Sar and was first climbed in 2006. The mountain is situated in a region known for high peaks, such as Lupghar Peak and Kuk Sar.
20	Jahangir Sar	5800	19,029	
21	Baden Sar	5455	17,897	
22	Reshitipur Sar	5413	17,760	
23	Sumayar Sar	5221	17,130	
24	Spandrin Sar	4829	15,843	
25	Raminji Sar	4651	15,259	
26	Suki Yenj	4431	14,537	

=== Passes ===
Mountain passes in Chapurson serve as crucial routes for local communities and historical trade, connecting the valley with neighboring regions and even across international borders.

Mountain Passes of Chapurson
S.No.	Pass Name	Elevation (m)	Elevation (ft)	Lie Between
01	Chilinji Pass	5411	17,753	Karambar valley in Ishkoman with the Chapursan Valley.
02	Irshad Pass (Irshod Uwin)	4963	16,283	Chapurson, Gilgit-Baltistan, and Wakhan Corridor, Afghanistan. Historically significant for cross-border movement.
03	Lupghar Pir Pass	5190	17,028	Chapurson - Yashkuk to Raminj Village.
04	ShuvQuir	4430	14,534	Chapurson - Misgar.
05	Ghulam Ali Pass	N/A	N/A	

=== Glaciers and Localities ===
The valleys and lower slopes of Chapurson are shaped by the presence of several significant glaciers, which are vital water sources and influence the local climate and ecology. Surrounding these glaciers are various small localities.

Glaciers and Localities of Chapurson
S.No.	Name	Type	Elevation (m)	Elevation (ft)	Detail	Associated Peaks/Passes
01	Shikardesh Kuk	Locality	3751	12,306	A locality in Hunza-Nagar District, Gilgit-Baltistan, situated near Lal Mitti and Kuk Jerab.	Kuz Sar, Kumpire Dior Sar
02	Kuk Jerab	Locality	3910	12,828	A locality in Hunza-Nagar District, Gilgit-Baltistan, situated near Lal Mitti and Shikardesh Kuk.	Kuk Sar, Pamir Sar, Lupghar Pir Pass, Lupghar Group
03	Yashkuk Yaz Glacier	Glacier	3929	12,890	A glacier located near Pamri and Shikardesh Kuk.	Yishkuk Sar (Yashkuk Sar), Nadim Sar, Cobeen Sar, Jahangir Sar, Kumpire Dior, Koz Sar, Mamu Sar
04	Chillinji Glacier	Glacier	3848	12,625		Koz Sar
05	Ghulam Ali Pass	Pass (also a feature)	N/A	N/A		
06	Biyater	Locality	4027	13,212	A locality in Hunza-Nagar District, Gilgit-Baltistan, situated near Yoe Virt and Beskiyeng.	
07	Qoz Yaz Glacier	Glacier	4049	13,284	A glacier situated near Biyatar and Beskiyeng.	

== See also ==
- Hunza Valley
- Gilgit-Baltistan
- Karakoram
