= Angat, Afghanistan =

Angat
- Location in Afghanistan
- Coordinates: 36°43′N 71°33′E
- Country: Afghanistan
- Province: Badakhshan Province
- District: Ishkashim

Angat is a village in Afghanistan, at the foot of the Ishkashem Pass. At the turn of the 20th century, there were six houses there.
