= Khandud =

Khandud خندود (Persian) ښندؤت (Wakhi)
- District center
- Location in Afghanistan
- Coordinates: 36°56′56″N 72°19′1″E
- Country: Afghanistan
- Province: Badakhshan
- District: Wakhan
- Elevation: 8,800 ft (2,700 m)

Population (2003)
  - Total: 1,244
- Time zone: UTC+04:30 (Afghanistan Time)

Khandud (Note: Dari: خندود, romanized: Khandūd, [xanˈduːd]; Pashto: خندود, romanized: Khandud, [xanˈdud]; Wakhi: ښندؤت, romanized: X̌əndʉt/X̌əndыt, [xənˈdɨt]) is a town in northeastern Afghanistan, serving as the administrative center of Wakhan District of Badakhshan Province. The town of Khandud is located near the left bank of the Panj River. It is connected by a gravel road to Qazideh and Ishkashim in the southwest and Gazkhan in the northeast.

Khandud was historically the center of one of the four administrative districts of Wakhan, which extended from Khandud to Digargand, and the site of an aksakal with authority over the Sad-i-Khandud. The Zoroastrian fort of Zamr-i-Atish Parast lay close by. It has long been used as a trade route between Kabul and Kashgar.

Around the turn of the 20th century, it housed around 200 people. There was extensive cultivation, including willow for the purposes of firewood, with excellent grazing. More recently, the town seems to have been renamed Khan Daulat, which is listed as being about 29 kilometres southwest of Qala-i-Panjah.

The population of Khandud was estimated in 2003 at approximately 1,244 people. Most of them are the native ethnic Wakhi people of the region.

== Climate ==
Khandud has a subarctic climate (Köppen climate classification Dsc) with cold, snowy winters and cool summers.

Climate data for Khandud
Month	Jan	Feb	Mar	Apr	May	Jun	Jul	Aug	Sep	Oct	Nov	Dec	Year
Daily mean °C (°F)	−12.3 (9.9)	−10.7 (12.7)	−4.9 (23.2)	1.7 (35.1)	5.6 (42.1)	10.3 (50.5)	13.3 (55.9)	13.2 (55.8)	9.0 (48.2)	3.2 (37.8)	−2.9 (26.8)	−8.3 (17.1)	1.4 (34.6)
Average precipitation mm (inches)	46.6 (1.83)	57.5 (2.26)	79.0 (3.11)	74.5 (2.93)	60.3 (2.37)	21.7 (0.85)	16.1 (0.63)	13.5 (0.53)	8.8 (0.35)	27.4 (1.08)	35.8 (1.41)	49.2 (1.94)	490.4 (19.29)
Average relative humidity (%)	59.7	61.3	58.6	56.7	53.1	43.1	43.8	45.9	44.8	46.7	49.1	55.4	51.5
Source: Weatherbase

== Economy ==
The people of Khandud are villagers involved in agriculture, transport, trade, and tourism. Some go to work in Kabul or in other Afghan cities.

== See also ==
- Valleys of Afghanistan
