= GUNT =

GUNT, Gunt, or Gunts may refer to:

- Transitional Government of National Unity, a former government of Chad
- GUNT offensive, a military operation of the Chadian–Libyan conflict

== Geography ==
- Dogor Gunt, a village in north-eastern Afghanistan
- Gunt River, a river in Tajikistan

== People ==
- Peer Günt, a Finnish hard rock band
- Bucky Gunts, Head of Production for NBC Olympics

== In fiction ==
- Raymond Gunt, the main antagonist of the novel Worst. Person. Ever.
- Martha Gunt, a character in the film The Witch's Curse
