= Gazkhan =

- Location in Afghanistan
- Coordinates: 37°1′7″N 72°41′30″E
- Country: Afghanistan
- Province: Badakhshan
- District: Wakhan
- Time zone: UTC+04:30 (Afghanistan Time)

Gazkhan is a village in the Wakhan District of Badakhshan Province in north-eastern Afghanistan. It is located at the confluence of the Panj River and Wakhan River. Ghazkhan is the starting point of the Grand Pamir Road in Afghanistan, which is being rehabilitated and expanded to the Wakhjir Pass (Afghanistan–China border). Gazkhan is also the starting point for treks into the Great Pamir. The land has been used historically as one of the trade routes between Kabul and Kashgar.

Gazkhan is mostly inhabited by the Wakhi people. The population of the village was reported in 2003 as being only 149. The nearest populated places to Gazkhan are Khandud to the southwest and Sarhad to the east.
