= Rokowt =

- Location in Afghanistan
- Coordinates: 36°59′0″N 73°15′0″E
- Country: Afghanistan
- Province: Badakhshan Province
- Time zone: + 4.30

Rokowt is a village in the Wakhan, Badakhshan Province in north-eastern Afghanistan. It lies on the Wakhan River between Qila-e Panja and Sarhad-e Broghil.

== See also ==
- Badakhshan Province
