= Afroze-Numa =

Pakistani shepherdesses

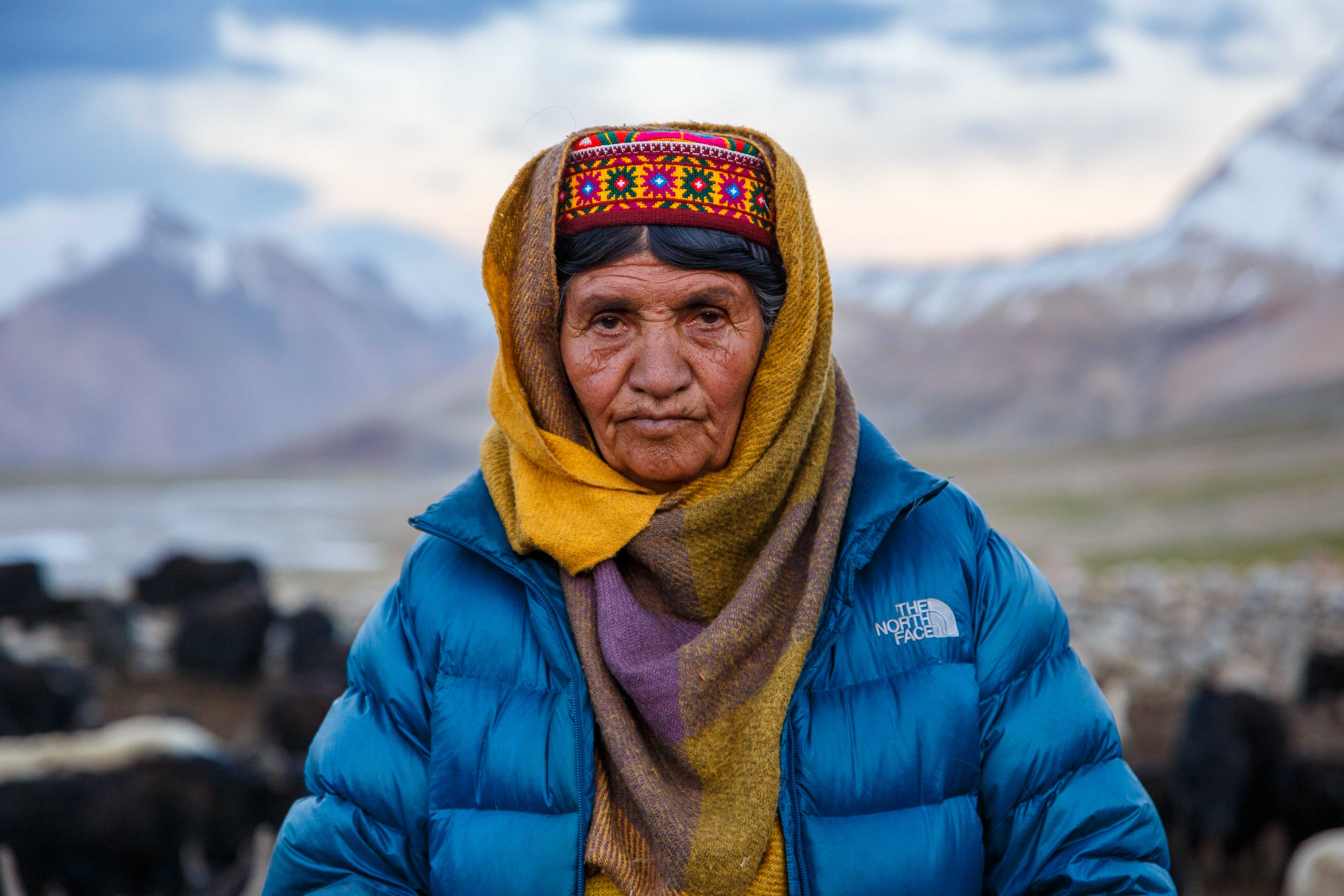
- Afroze Numa at Shuwwurth, Shimshal Pass
- Born: Pakistan
- Occupation: shepherdesses
- Awards: 100 Women (BBC) (2023)

Afroze-Numa (Urdu: افروز نما) is a Pakistani shepherdess and a member of the 2023 BBC 100 Women. She is one of the last Wakhi shepherdesses who have taken care of goats, yaks and sheep for centuries. She has been involved for nearly three decades.

== Biography ==
In Pakistan's Shimshal valley, Numa is a part of a centuries-old custom that is disappearing. Her mother and grandmothers taught her the craft. Every year, she and the other shepherdesses accompany their flocks to pastures 4,800 metres above sea level, where they feed their animals and produce dairy products for trade. Their income has brought the village prosperity and allowed them to provide education for their children. Her income allowed her to be the first person in her valley to own a pair of shoes.

== Recognition ==
In November 2023, BBC recognised Afroze-Numa's community work as "one of the last Wakhi shepherdesses," carrying on the ancient custom to this day, by naming her as on the BBC's 100 Women list.
