= Lupghar Pir Pass =

Pakistani mountain pass

- Elevation: 5,190 m (17,030 ft)
- Location: Pakistan
- Range: Hindukush Mountains
- Coordinates: 36°44′42″N 74°28′22″E

Lupghar Pir pass (el. 5,190 m (17,030 ft)) is a high mountain pass 9 km (6 mi) to the west of village Lupghar in the upper Hunza valley in Chipurson Gojal tehsil of Gilgit district in Gilgit-Baltistan, Pakistan. Luphar Pir Pass link Yashkuk Chipurson to Ramij Village of Chipurson.
