= Noshaq =

Mountain in Afghanistan and Pakistan

- Noshak, Nowshakh
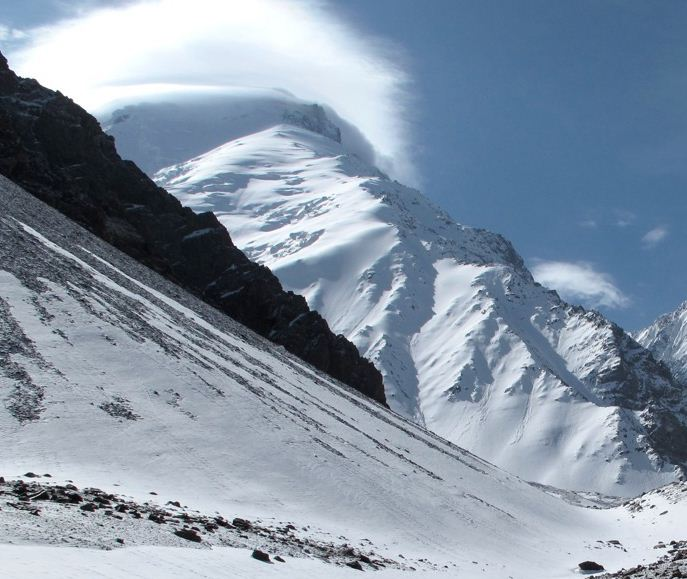

Highest point
- Elevation: 7,492 m (24,580 ft); Ranked 52nd
- Prominence: 2,024 m (6,640 ft)
- Listing: Country high point Ultra
- Coordinates: 36°25′54″N 71°49′42″E

Naming
- Native name: نوشاخ (Dari)

Geography
- Location within Afghanistan Location within Khyber Pakhtunkhwa Location within Pakistan
- Countries: Afghanistan and Pakistan
- Province: Badakhshan, Afghanistan; Khyber Pakhtunkhwa, Pakistan
- Parent range: Hindu Kush

Climbing
- First ascent: 17 August 1960 by Toshiaki Sakai and Goro Iwatsubo (Japan)
- Easiest route: glacier/snow climb

Noshaq is a 7,492 m (24,580 ft) high peak in the Hindu Kush lying on the border of Afghanistan and Pakistan. It is the highest mountain in Afghanistan, the second highest in the Hindu Kush after Terich Mir, and the 52nd highest in the world. It is also the westernmost 7,000 m (22,966 ft) peak in the world.

The south and eastern sides of the mountain are in Pakistan whereas the north and west sides are in Afghanistan. The easiest access to Noshaq is from the village of Qazideh in the Wakhan District of Badakhshan Province, Afghanistan. Foreigners are required to have an Afghan visa, including a special permission letter from Afghanistan's Ministry of Information and Culture.

== Climbing history ==
Noshaq main was first climbed by a Japanese expedition on 17 August 1960, led by Professor Yajiro Sakato. Other members of the expedition were Goro Iwatsubo and Toshiaki Sakai. The climb followed the normal Afghanistan approach, the West ridge from the Qazideh Glacier.

Noshaq East, Noshaq Central and Noshaq West were first climbed in 1963 by Austrians Dr. Gerald Gruber and Rudolf Pischenger.

The Tiroler Hindukusch-Ski-Expedition of Akademischer Alpenklub Innsbruck (Austria) made the first ski descent from the summit of Noshaq in 1970. The famous meteorologist Karl Gabl was a member of the team.

The first winter ascent was 13 February 1973 by Tadeusz Piotrowski and Andrzej Zawada, members of a Polish expedition, via the north face. It was the first winter climb of any 7000 m peak and is the only winter ascent of this mountain.

From the 1978 Saur Revolution and the decades of wars that followed, the mountain was very difficult to access because of political turmoil in the region. In 2011, National Geographic noted that the trail to the summit was again accessible to climbers, with hopes of opening the area up for tourism.

== See also ==
- Extreme points of Afghanistan
- List of elevation extremes by country
- Tourism in Afghanistan
