= Raminji =

Village in Gilgit-Baltistan, Pakistan

Khairabad Raminji
- village
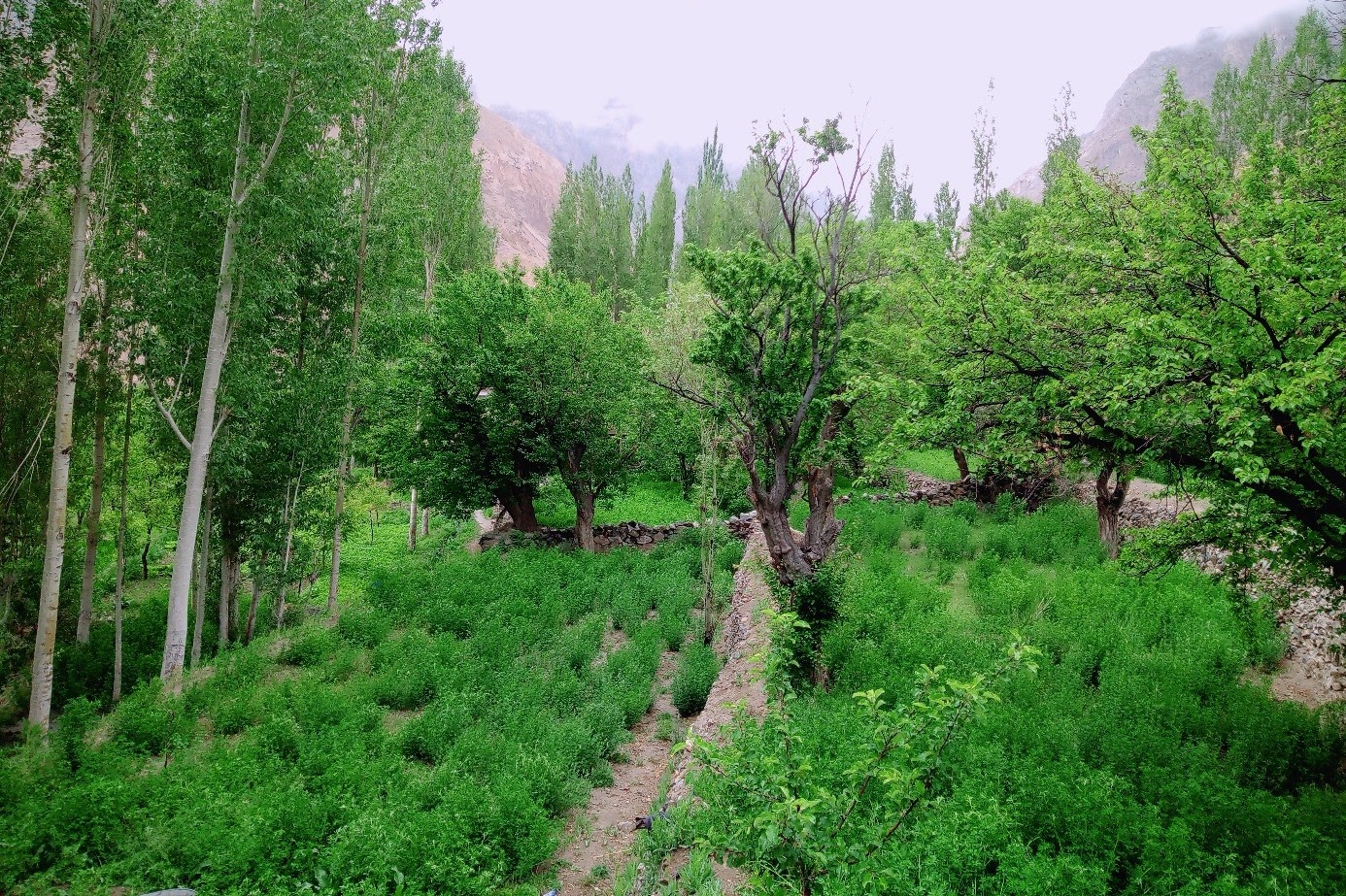

- Location within Gilgit Baltistan Location within Pakistan
- Coordinates: 36.754°N 74.707°E
- Country: Pakistan
- Territory: Gilgit Baltistan

Population
  - Total: 35 households

Raminji or Raminj or Khairabad Raminj is a village in the Chipursan Valley of Gojal, Gilgit-Baltistan, Pakistan Overview Once, Daltas Raminji in Gojal was a barren, rocky land with no water or crops. According to tradition, the ruler of Hunza (Meer Nazim khan) sent twelve young men to carve out a water channel. During the work, a landslide occurred, and six of them were martyred. Despite fear and loss, the canal was eventually completed through great sacrifice, and Daltas Raminji was settled.in 1922 AD. With time, fields flourished and life returned. Even today, the descendants of those martyrs live there, and elders say the canal carries the blood of their ancestors. The era of kings ended, in 1974 AD systems changed, and sacrifices slowly faded from memory. Realizing that survival now depended on education, the community struggled to establish a school up to grade eight despite poverty and hardships. That school became a symbol of the martyrs’ dreams. Later, young people left for cities in search of higher education and jobs. Many succeeded but did not return, and the village gradually began to empty. Today, Raminji (Khairabad) lacks basic facilities such as schools, hospitals, roads, and internet access.

== Politics ==
Nazir Sabir, the famed Pakistani mountaineer who summited Everest and K2, was born in Raminji in the Chipursan valley. He began his political career from Shrine of Baba Ghundi and was elected to the Gilgit Baltistan Legislative Assembly.
