= Nicholas Range (Pamir Mountains) =

Mountains in Afghanistan

Coordinates: 37.1500°N 73.2100°E

The Nicholas Range (Persian: سلسله کوه نیکلاس), known locally as Selselehi-i Koh-i-Wakhan (Dari: سلسله کوه واخان/ Pashto: د واخان د غرونو لړۍ) is a range of mountains in the Pamir Mountains on the border of Afghanistan and Tajikistan that crosses the Wakhan in Afghanistan. The range separates the Little Pamir and Great Pamir in the Wakhan. The area is sparsely populated by Wakhi and Kyrgyz.

The range has peaks that rise 5500 to 5800 metres (18,000 to 19,000 ft) elevation. The range is about 160 kilometres (100 mi) in length. The Afghan-Tajik border follows the crest of the eastern half of the range.

The range was given the title Nicholas Range during the joint Russo-British Pamir Boundary Commission of 1895 that delineated the border between Russian and Afghan territory. In exchange for a British agreement to use the term Nicholas Range, in honour of Emperor Nicholas II of Russia, on official maps, the Russians agreed to refer to Lake Zorkul as Lake Victoria in honor of Queen Victoria of the United Kingdom.
