= Kuksar =

Mountain in northern Pakistan

Kuksar (sometimes referred to as Kuk Sar) is a 6,943 metre (21,302 ft) peak in the Karakoram range of the Himalayas in northern Pakistan. It lies at the head of the Batura glacier, the nearest town being Pasu and Chapursan, on the Karakoram Highway. Along with Kuksar Main peak are Kuksar North (6,925 metres) and Kuksar South (6,789 metres).

There have been few attempts to climb the mountain and it has only ever been successfully climbed once, in 1982, by an expedition made up of four friends - Tim Hurrell, Steve Brodrick, Martin Hore and Martin Gledhill. The four set off from Rawalpindi to climb Kuksar, accompanied by a Liaison Officer Maqsood Ahmed and an experienced local climber Qamar Jan. Only two of the climbers, Hurrell and Brodrick made it to the top, topping the summit on July 19, 1982, but both were killed by an avalanche the next day, July 20, on their way down. The bodies were discovered by Hore and Gledhill, along with Hurrell's notebook and camera (proving their successful summit of the mountain), on July 22, 1982.
