= Wakhan Mirdom =

1740–1888 Pamiri state in Central Asia

Mirdom of Wakhan میری گری واخان (Persian) Mīrīgarī-yi Wakhān (Persian)
- Capital: Qala-i-Panjah
- Common languages: Persian; Wakhi; Kyrgyz
- Ethnic groups: Wakhi people, Kyrgyz
- Religion: Isma'ilism (majority); Sunni Islam (minority, mostly among the Kyrgyz)
- Demonym: Wakhi
- Government: Principality
  - 1740–1775: Jahan Khan
  - 1775–1838: Muhammad Rahim Beg
  - 1838–1842: Shah Turai
  - 1842–1856: Fath 'Ali Shah (first reign)
  - 1856–1864: Shah Mir Beg
  - 1864 – January 1875: Fath 'Ali Shah (second reign)
  - January 1875 – 14 August 1883: 'Ali Mardan Khan (first reign)
  - September – Winter 1888: 'Ali Mardan Khan (second reign)

Population
  - Estimate: 6,000 (1880)
- Today part of: Afghanistan; Tajikistan

The Mirdom of Wakhan (Persian: میری گری واخان, romanized: Mīrīgarī-yi Wakhān), Principality of Wakhan (Persian: شاهزاده‌نشین واخان, romanized: Shāhzādanishīn-ī Wākhān), or the Khanate of Wakhan (Persian: خانات واخان, romanized: Khānāt-e Wakhān) was a semi-independent Wakhi principality in Central Asia that existed until 1883. It controlled both banks of the Upper Amu Darya and was governed by a hereditary chieftain known as a mir, with its capital at Qala-i-Panjah.

== Background ==
Wakhan had existed since the time of the Sasanian Empire when it was subjugated by the latter in 224 until 651 when the authority there collapsed. They were also subjugated by the Hephthalites, the First Turkic Khaganate, the Tibetan Empire, the Tang dynasty, the Samanid Empire, and later many Turko-Mongol khanates until their eventual subjugation by the Emirate of Afghanistan and the Russian Empire in the late 19th century.

== History ==
=== Establishment and early years ===
Nonetheless, Wakhan's origin story is obscure. According to local tradition, in 1581 four brothers from Iran travelled to Badakhshan to spread the Isma'ili doctrine and eventually settled in the region. The people of Wakhan chose Shah Khudadad as their ruler and founded the Mirdom.

During the reign of Shah Qirghiz, ruler of Darvaz from 1638 to 1668, Wakhan, Karategin, Roshan, Shughnan, and Wakhsh were under his control. However, upon his death and during the reign of his successor, Maḥmūd Shah, Wakhan and Shughnan-Roshan were able to declare their independence.

Despite occasionally being under direct Qing Chinese or Khoqandian suzerainty, for the most part prior to the Great Game, Wakhan was a tributary to Badakhshan, which itself was a tributary state of Qing China.

=== Reign of Jahan Khan ===
Little information is known about the Wakhi mirs before the 19th century. The first Mir we have any information on is Jahan Khan, who reigned from 1740 to 1775. In Mirza Muhammad Ghufran's "New History of Chitral", Jahan Khan is portrayed as a raider and looter of Chitral. He is mentioned when one of his daughters was married to the ruler of Badakhshan. Jahān Khan is also credited with building the new capital of Wakhan, Qal'ah-yi Panjah, which would serve as the capital of Wakhan until the early 20th century when it switched to Khandut. The area was full of arable land and was close to the states of Hunza and Chitral, which often had good relations with the Mirs of Wakhan. They often fled there from raids by the rulers of Badakhshan.

=== Reign of Muhammad Rahim Beg and invasion by Qunduz ===
Jahan Khan was succeeded by his eldest son, Muhammad Rahim Beg. Muhammad Rahim Beg tried to assert his independence by refusing to pay taxes to Badakhshan, a dependency of the Khanate of Qunduz. The ruler of the khanate, Muhammad Murad Beg, tried to appoint members of his Qataghani Uzbek tribesmen to the region. Muhammad 'Ali Beg was sent towards Wakhan but he was killed at Qal'eh-ye Panjeh and his army was routed. This likely occurred around c. 1830. His brother, Kuhkan Beg, was sent to avenge his death, causing the Wakhi mir to flee to Chitral. Kuhkan Bek followed him to Chitral and was well-received by the mehtar, Aman al-Mulk. However, the mehtar changed his mind and ordered the assassination of Kuhkan Bek. After his death, the Uzbek forces left Wakhan and Chitral, allowing Muhammad Rahim Beg to reclaim his throne.

During these events, a British traveller named John Wood arrived in Qal'ah-yi Panjah in April 1838. The Wakhi mir was unable to assist Wood, as he was summoned by Muhammad Murad Beg at Qunduz. Wood warned Muhammad Rahim Beg to attend the summons. Muhammad Murad Beg would later arrest Rahim Beg as he arrived in Qunduz. Wood's interpreter, who had given evidence against Rahim Beg, stated that he was brutally beaten to death by Murad Beg himself in front of his guests, helped by a Wakhi resident whose father was killed during the invasion.

As a result of his death, Wakhan's administration was taken over by a relative of the mir of Badakhshan, Shah Turai, appointed by the Muhammad Murad Beg. Shah Turai ruled for 4 years in Wakhan, until Murad Beg was expelled from Badakhshan by Mirza Kalan in 1842. Fath 'Ali Shah, a younger brother of Rahim Beg, who was in exile in Chitral, took advantage of the situation to reclaim the throne of Wakhan.

== Territory, administration and government ==
=== Administrative divisions ===
The Mirdom of Wakhan was divided into four districts administered by a village elder (aqsaqāl) and were known as sad/sada/sadda (Persian: صد, romanized: ṣad, lit. one hundred), referring to the number of households in each district. These districts were Ishtrāgh (Persian: اشتراغ), (Note: Also known as Ishtrakh.) Khandūt (Persian: خندوت) (Note: Also known as Khandud.), Panja (Persian: پنجه), (Note: Also known as Sipanj, Spinj, and Ispanj.) and Sarḥad (Persian: سرحد). Ṣad-ī Ishtrāgh was once an independent principality before being incorporated into Wakhan. It enjoyed a special status within Wakhan, as the ruler in Fayzabad could capture slaves (ylom) and certain dues in the region which he was unable to do in other regions of Wakhan. The aqsaqal of the district was also appointed by the ruler of Badakhshan and not by the Mir of Wakhan.

=== Territorial extent ===
In addition to the four districts, the primarily Kyrgyz Great Pamir (Persian: پامیر کلان, romanized: Pāmīr-e Kalān) and Little Pamir (Persian: پامیر خرد, romanized: Pāmīr-e Khord) regions, together with the Alichur valley, were under the suzerainty of the Mirs of Wakhan. However the Mir's influence in Alichur was frequently weakened by Kyrgyz from Shughnan, who would frequently occupy it. One traveller wrote that the Western Taghdumbash from the Little and Great Pamirs towards the Ak Tash valley in the west belonged to the Mir of Wakhan. For an extended amount of time, the Pamirs would be devoid of any Kyrgyz population. By 1874 a British mission was to note that due to constant war between the Wakhis, Shughnis, Kanjudis, and the Alai Kyrgyz the area had virtually no inhabitants. In 1877 Chinese forces, having conquered Yettishar, were able to occupy the Little Pamir and take it out of Wakhan's jurisdiction.

The principalities of Ishkāshim and Ghārān were tributaries to Wakhan. However, other sources contradict this. Henry Trotter and Munshi Abdul Rahim were to note that the Ishkashim region was a tributary of the rulers of Badakhshan, and not of Wakhan.

=== Government ===
The Mirdom was led by a ruler known as a Mir. Despite the mirs being ethnically Wakhi, they consistently claimed foreign roots. The last two Mirs (Fatḥ 'Ali Shah and 'Ali Mardān Khan) claimed descent from Alexander the Great. The Mir and his relatives belonged to "the Mir tribe" (Persian: میر‌کتار, romanized: mīr-kutār), a clan that held all political and economic influence. The mīr-kutār and other members of the royal family ruled over the four districts of Wakhan with the assistance of judges (qāz̤īs) and the aqsaqāls. The qāzīs were responsible for trying petty crimes and giving sentences for fines or beatings.

=== Taxation ===
The Mir's revenue was rather limited and representative of the poor condition of the principality. The Mir collected defined quantities like one sheep, a basket of wheat, four kilograms of butter, and a horseshoe. Different households had to pay varying amounts in taxes. In addition to the sedentary farmers of the 4 ṣads, the Kyrgyz pastoralists of the Great and Little Pamirs paid a grazing tax.

== Society and population ==
The exact population of Wakhan is not known. Various estimates have been given for its population, with contradictions with the estimates in earlier reports. One estimate puts the total population of Wakhan at around 6,000 at the time of its annexation. According to one source, there were around 550 households in the four districts of Wakhan. Another estimate puts 334 households on the left bank of the Panj and 189 (Note: Consisting of 2,118 people.) on the right bank, or 523 in total. Munshi Abdul Rahim, during his visit to Wakhan in 1879–80, lists the population at 342 households.

== Rulers ==
Not much is known about the Mirs of Wakhan before the 19th century. All mirs before Jahan Khan we know nothing about, except their names.

The table below shows the Mirs of Wakhan according to Iloliev, with obscure Mirs italicized and known Mirs in bold.

Mirs of Wakhan
Name	Reign	Notes
Farhad Beg (Maska) فرهاد بیگ (مسکه)	? – ?	
Shah Khudadat (Khaja) شاه خداداد (خواجه)	? – ?	
Mahdi مهدی	? – ?	
Mansur منصور	? – ?	
Shah Jahan شاه جهان	? – 1740	
**Jahan Khan** جهان خان	1740–1775	
**Muhammad Rahim Beg** محمد رحیم بیگ	1775–1838	
**Shah Turai (Kunduzi rule)** شاه تری	1838–1842	
**Fath 'Ali Shah (first reign)** فتح علی شاه	1842–1856	
**Shah Mir Beg** شاه میر بیگ	1856–1864	
**Fath 'Ali Shah (second reign)** فتح علی شاه	1864 – January 1875	
**'Ali Mardan Khan (first reign)** علی مردان خان	January 1875 – 14 August 1883	
**'Ali Mardan Khan (second reign)** علی مردان خان	September – Winter 1888	
