= Dogor Gunt =

Dogor Gunt Dogor Gūnt
- Location in Afghanistan
- Coordinates: 36°47′36″N 72°0′57″E
- Country: Afghanistan
- Province: Badakhshan Province
- District: Wakhan
- Time zone: + 4.30

Dogor Gunt, also written Digargand, is a village in Badakhshan Province in north-eastern Afghanistan.
