= Ishkashim, Afghanistan =

Ishkashim
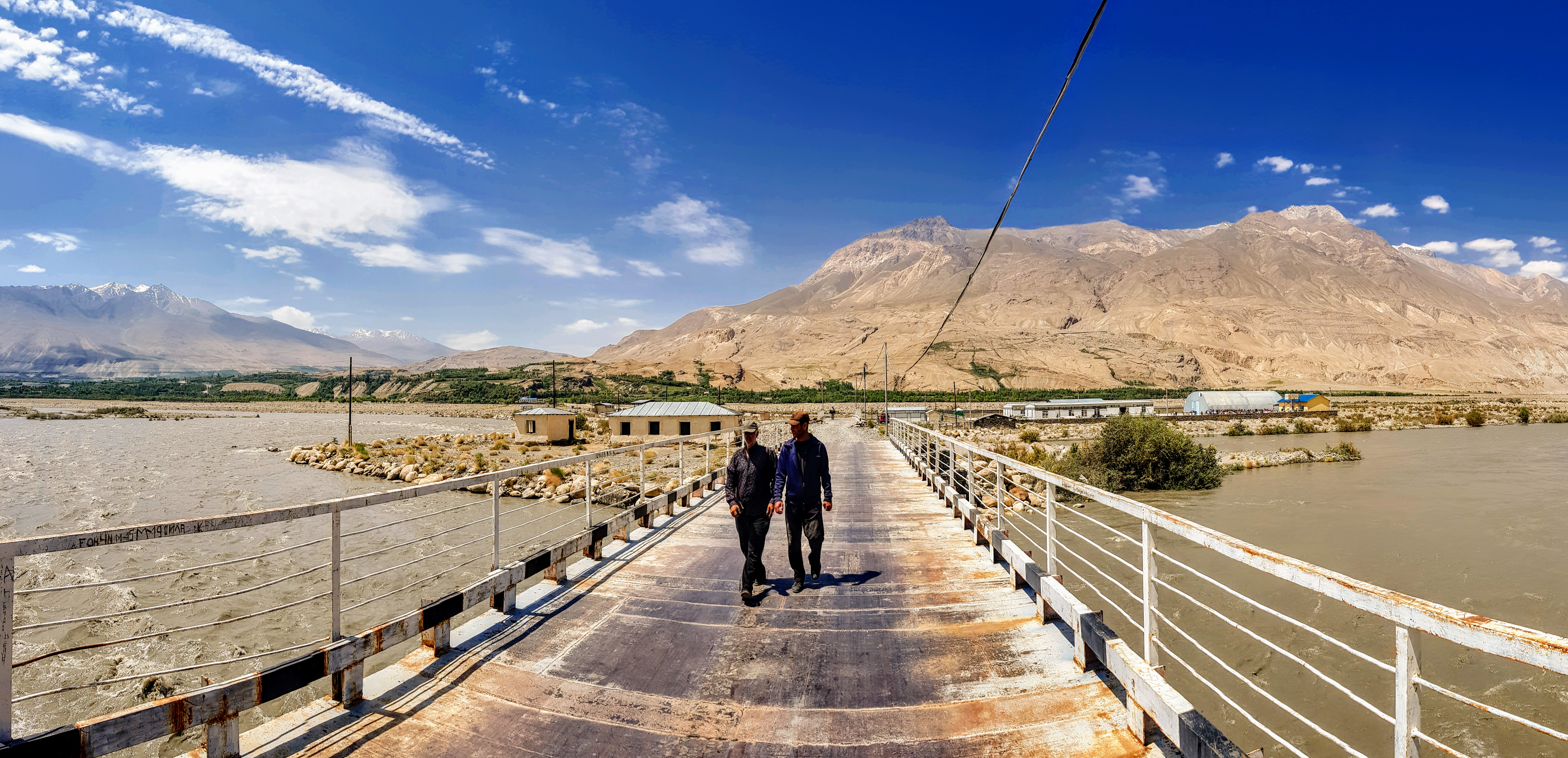
- A bridge over the Panj River at Ishkashim

- Location in Afghanistan
- Coordinates: 36°42′33″N 71°34′26″E
- Country: Afghanistan
- Province: Badakhshan
- District: Ishkashim
- Elevation: 8,500 ft (2,600 m)

Population
  - Total: 12,120
- Time zone: UTC+04:30 (Afghanistan Time)

Ishkashim (Dari: اشکاشم, romanized: Iškāšim; Iskashimi: Šəkošəm; also transliterated Eshkashem) is a border town in Badakhshan Province of Afghanistan, which has a population of around 12,120 people. The town serves as the capital of Ishkashim District. Another town by the same name is located on the other side of Panj River in the Gorno-Badakhshan region of Tajikistan, although that town is normally transliterated Ishkoshim following Tajik practice. A bridge linking the two towns was reconstructed in 2006.

Ishkashim lies in a fertile valley at an elevation of 3,037 m (9,964 ft) meters. There are roughly 20 settlements in the valley, but considering the cultivation in the valley is contiguous, it could also be considered a single larger settlement. The valley has only one harvest per year. Wheat and barley are cultivated. Poplar, chinar and maple trees grow as well, but there is little firewood.

Ishkashim is connected by road with Fayzabad in the northwest, through the town of Baharak. It is also connected to the towns of Zebak in the southwest and Khandud in the northeast. The valley lies in an important strategic area, as it commands the only route between the districts of Fayzabad, Shighnan, and Wakhan accessible during the winter. It has a number of small shops, hotels, guest houses, schools and government buildings, including a base for the Afghan Border Police. Many local and foreign tourists visit the town.

== Etymology ==
The town has been mentioned under various alternative forms of its name historically, including Šikāšim (شکاشم), Sikāšim (سکاشم), Sikīmišt (سکیمشت), and Iskīmišt (اسکیمشت).

According to Russian Iranologist Tatyana Nikolayevna Pakhalina, the toponym originates from Indo-Iranian *sakā-kṣ̌amā, meaning "land of the Saka" or "Scythia". This would make it related to the names of the regions of Shighnan and Sistan. Alternatively, according to Uzbek philologist Shamsiddin Kamoliddinov, the toponym originates from Turkic *eskimiš, deriving from eski ("old") and -miš (toponym-deriving suffix).

== History ==
Badakhshan became an Islamic region during the Samanid Empire. It fell to the Ghaznavids followed by the Ghurids and others, and has been used as a trade route between Kabul and Kashgar. By the 18th century, it became part of the Durrani Empire after rulers of the Qing dynasty of China signed a treaty with Ahmad Shah Durrani. Large territory that is now north of the Amur River (or the Afghanistan–Tajikistan border) was part of Afghanistan until the late 19th century when the 1893 Durand Line Agreement and the 1895 Pamir Boundary Commission protocols were signed. At that time Badakhshan became a buffer zone between what was then Tsarist Russia and British India. The area south of the Amur River is currently under the control of the Afghan National Police and Afghan Armed Forces, which took over responsibility from the previous NATO-trained Afghan National Security Forces.

== Climate ==
The climate is generally cold, but much warmer than that of neighboring areas, such as Wakhan District. According to the Köppen climate classification, Ishkashim has a warm-summer humid continental climate (Dsb) with pleasant summers and cold winters. The average annual temperature in Ishkashim is 4.3 °C (39.7 °F). About 569 mm (22.40 in) of precipitation falls annually.

Climate data for Ishkashim
Month	Jan	Feb	Mar	Apr	May	Jun	Jul	Aug	Sep	Oct	Nov	Dec	Year
Mean daily maximum °C (°F)	−4.7 (23.5)	−3.6 (25.5)	2.0 (35.6)	9.1 (48.4)	13.9 (57.0)	19.6 (67.3)	22.7 (72.9)	22.8 (73.0)	18.9 (66.0)	12.3 (54.1)	4.9 (40.8)	−1.5 (29.3)	9.7 (49.4)
Daily mean °C (°F)	−9.4 (15.1)	−7.8 (18.0)	−2.2 (28.0)	4.3 (39.7)	8.4 (47.1)	13.4 (56.1)	16.3 (61.3)	16.2 (61.2)	11.9 (53.4)	6.1 (43.0)	0.0 (32.0)	−5.5 (22.1)	4.3 (39.8)
Mean daily minimum °C (°F)	−14.1 (6.6)	−12.1 (10.2)	−6.4 (20.5)	−0.5 (31.1)	3.0 (37.4)	7.2 (45.0)	9.9 (49.8)	9.7 (49.5)	4.9 (40.8)	−0.1 (31.8)	−4.9 (23.2)	−9.5 (14.9)	−1.1 (30.1)
Average precipitation mm (inches)	56 (2.2)	73 (2.9)	101 (4.0)	94 (3.7)	69 (2.7)	19 (0.7)	14 (0.6)	11 (0.4)	8 (0.3)	29 (1.1)	39 (1.5)	56 (2.2)	569 (22.3)
Source: weather2visit.com

== Demographics ==
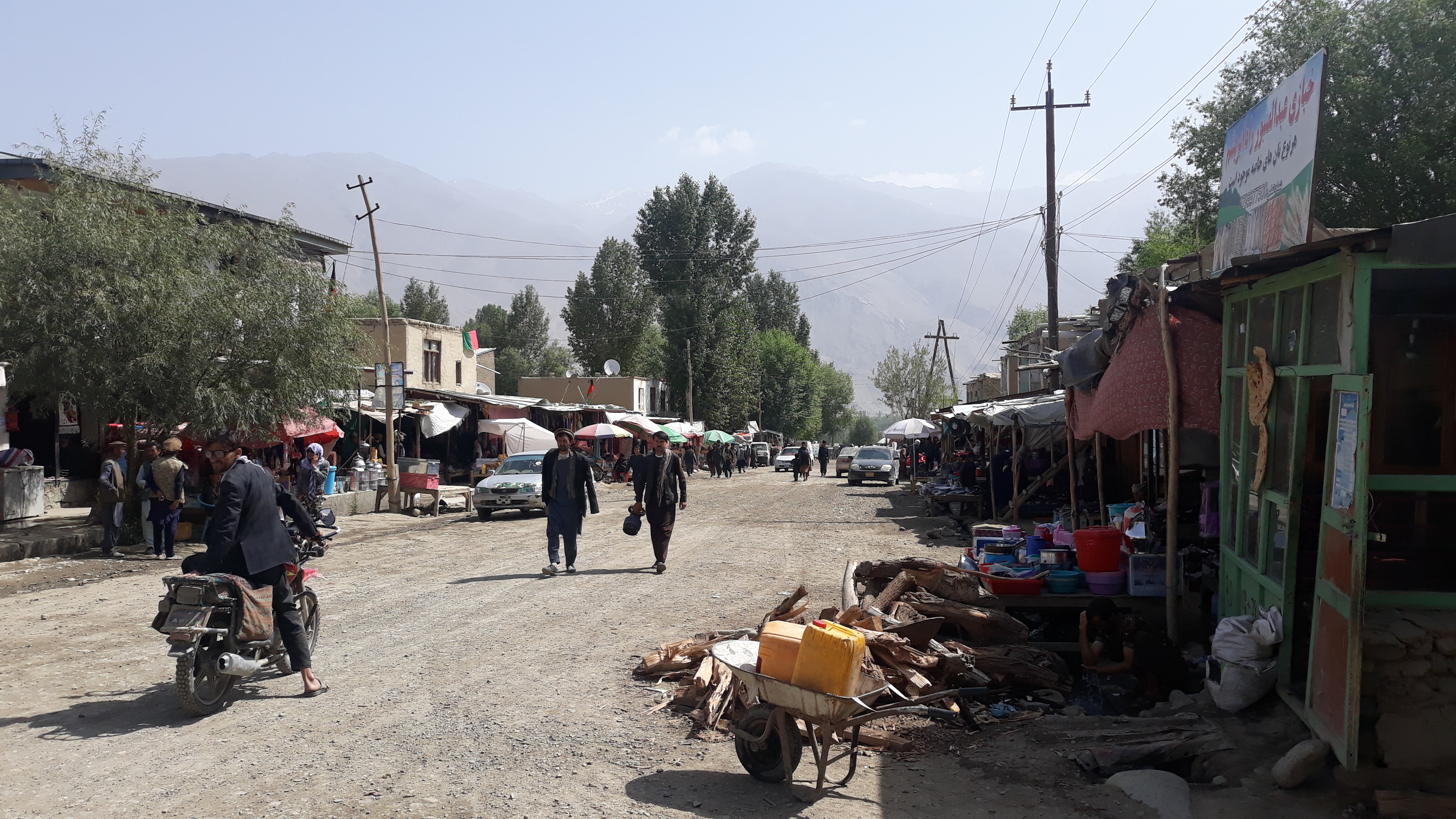
Local people

Dari is the dominant language in Ishkashim. Pashto is the second as many government officials and some locals are fluent in both of Afghanistan's official languages. Ethnic Tajiks make up the majority of the local population. Historically, there have also been many followers of Nizari Isma'ilism in the area, who are called Ishkashimis. Some of whom may speak the Ishkashimi language in addition to Dari.

== Economy ==
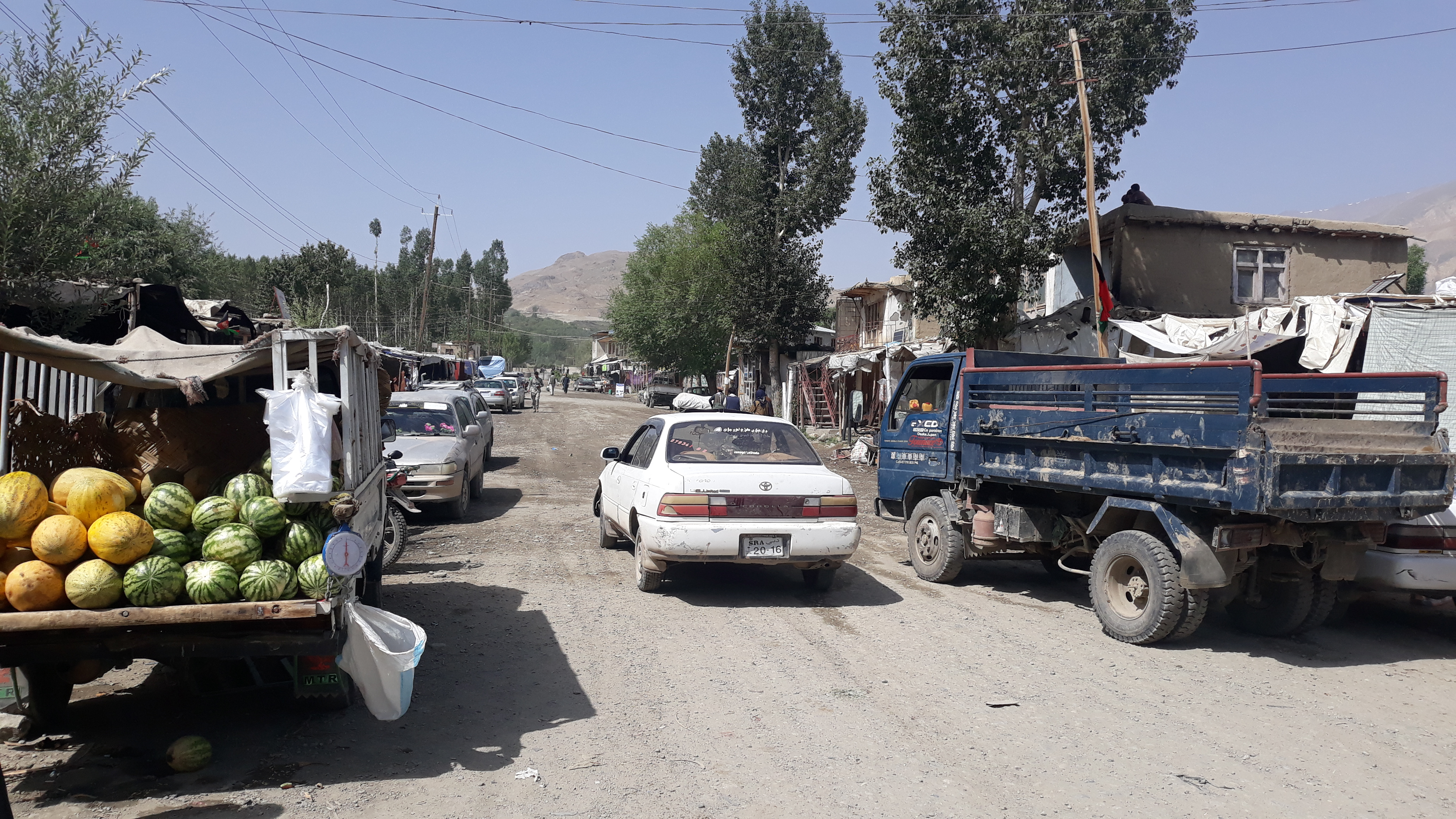
Market

The native people of Ishkashim are mostly involved in agriculture, transport, trade, and tourism. Many of them are unemployed. Some go to work in Kabul or in other Afghan cities.

== See also ==
- Sher Khan Bandar
- Valleys of Afghanistan
- Transport in Afghanistan
- Wakhjir Pass
