= Irshad Pass =

Mountain pass in Hindu Kush

- Interactive map of Irshad Pass
- Elevation: 4,979 metres (16,335 ft)

Third Approach
- Location: Afghanistan–Pakistan border
- Range: Hindu Kush
- Coordinates: 36°52′44″N 74°8′27″E

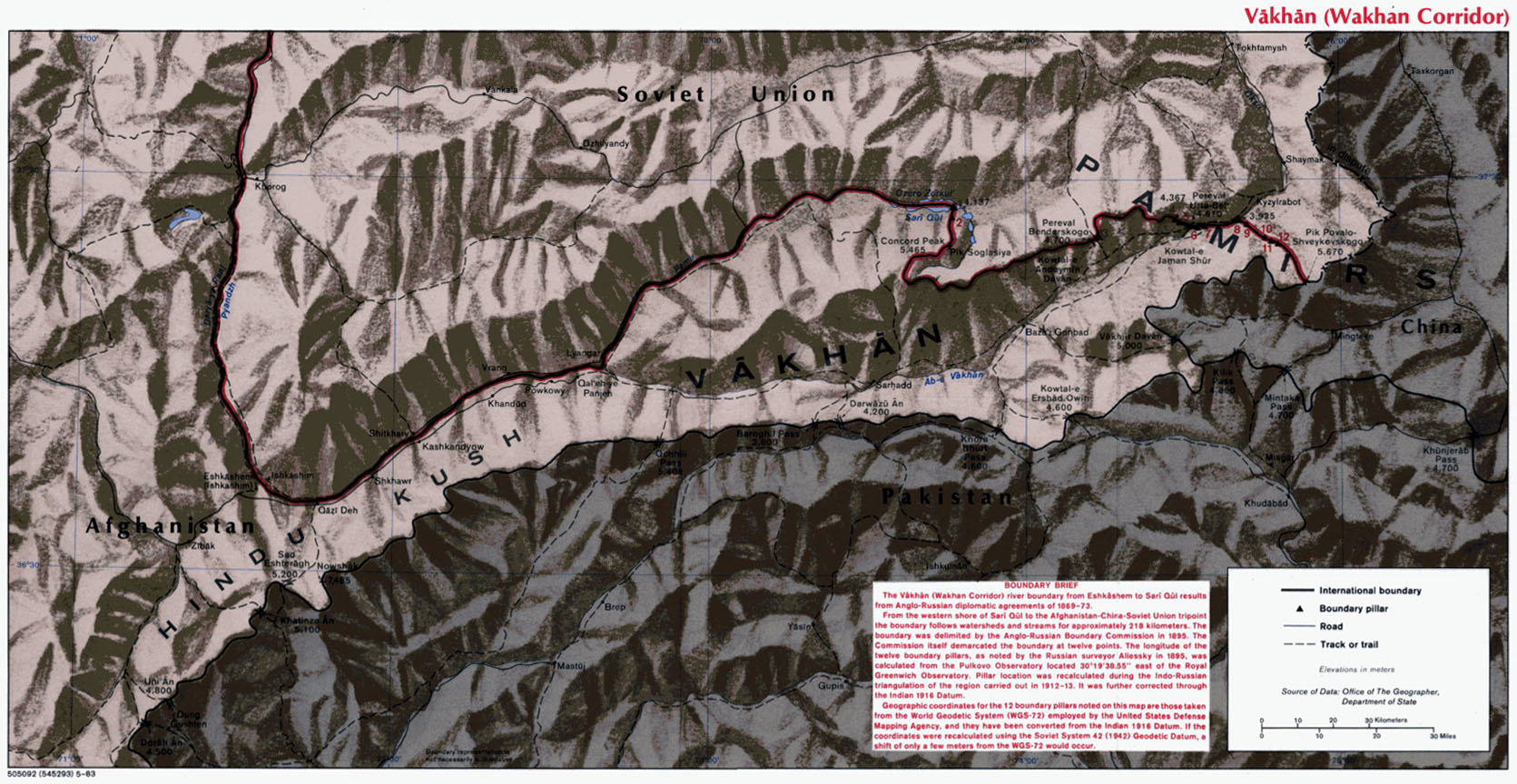
Map of the Wakhan Corridor

Irshad Pass (Note: also referred to as Ershād Yūvīn, Yirshod Wuyin, Irshād Uwin Pass, Kotale Ers̄āḏ Owīn.) (elevation 4,979 metres (16,335 ft)), is a mountain pass in the Hindu Kush that connects the Pakistani-administered territory of Gilgit-Baltistan with the Wakhan District of Badakhshan Province in Afghanistan. According to a map in the National Geographic Magazine, the pass is located at an elevation of 4,979 metres (16,335 ft). The National Geographic article mentioned that people from Afghanistan's Wakhan District, particularly the Kyrgyz people of Bazai Gumbad, regularly cross the Irshad Pass in spring and autumn to trade animals for supplies at Babaghundi Ziarat in north-western Hunza Valley.

== See also ==
- Broghil Pass
