= Ishkashim District =

Ishkashim اشکاشم
- District
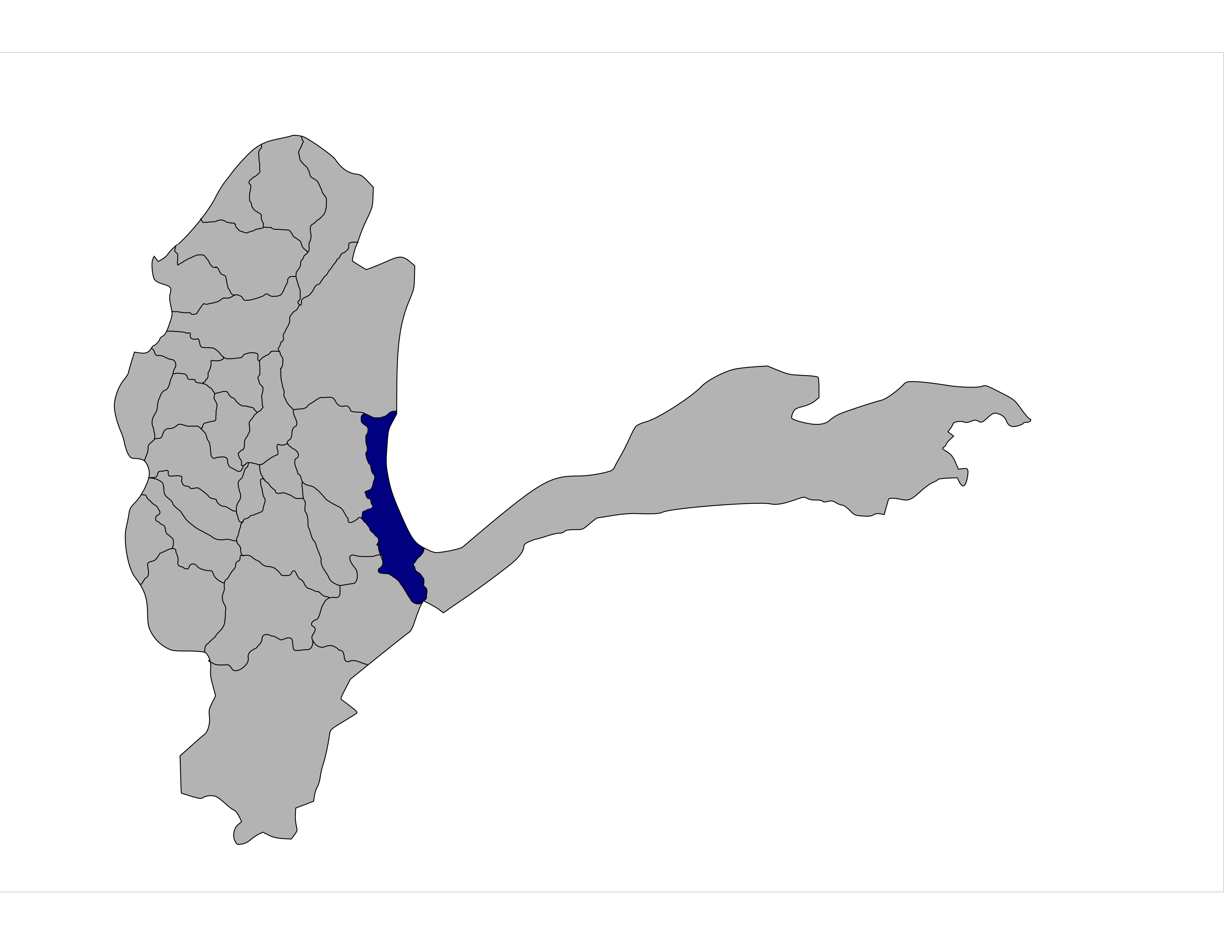
- Coordinates: 36°42′23″N 71°34′23″E
- Country: Afghanistan
- Province: Badakhshan
- Capital: Ishkashim
- Elevation: 8,500 ft (2,600 m)

Population (2021)
  - Total: 15,951
- Time zone: +4.30
  - Summer (DST): +4.30

Ishkashim District (Dari: ولسوالی اشکاشکم) is one of the 28 districts of Badakhshan province, eastern Afghanistan. The border town of Ishkashim serves as the district's capital. The population of the district is approximately 15,951 residents, majority of whom are believed to be ethnic Tajiks followed by Pashtuns, Uzbeks and others. In addition to Afghanistan's two main languages of Dari and Pashto, the language of Ishkashimi is also spoken in the district by the native people.

Ishkashim District lies between Khyber Pakhtunkhwa in Pakistan and Gorno-Badakhshan in Tajikistan, where there is a settlement with the same name: Ishkoshim. The Wakhan District is to the east. The area fell to the Taliban in July 2021.

== See also ==
- Districts of Afghanistan
- Valleys of Afghanistan
