= Qala-i-Panjah =

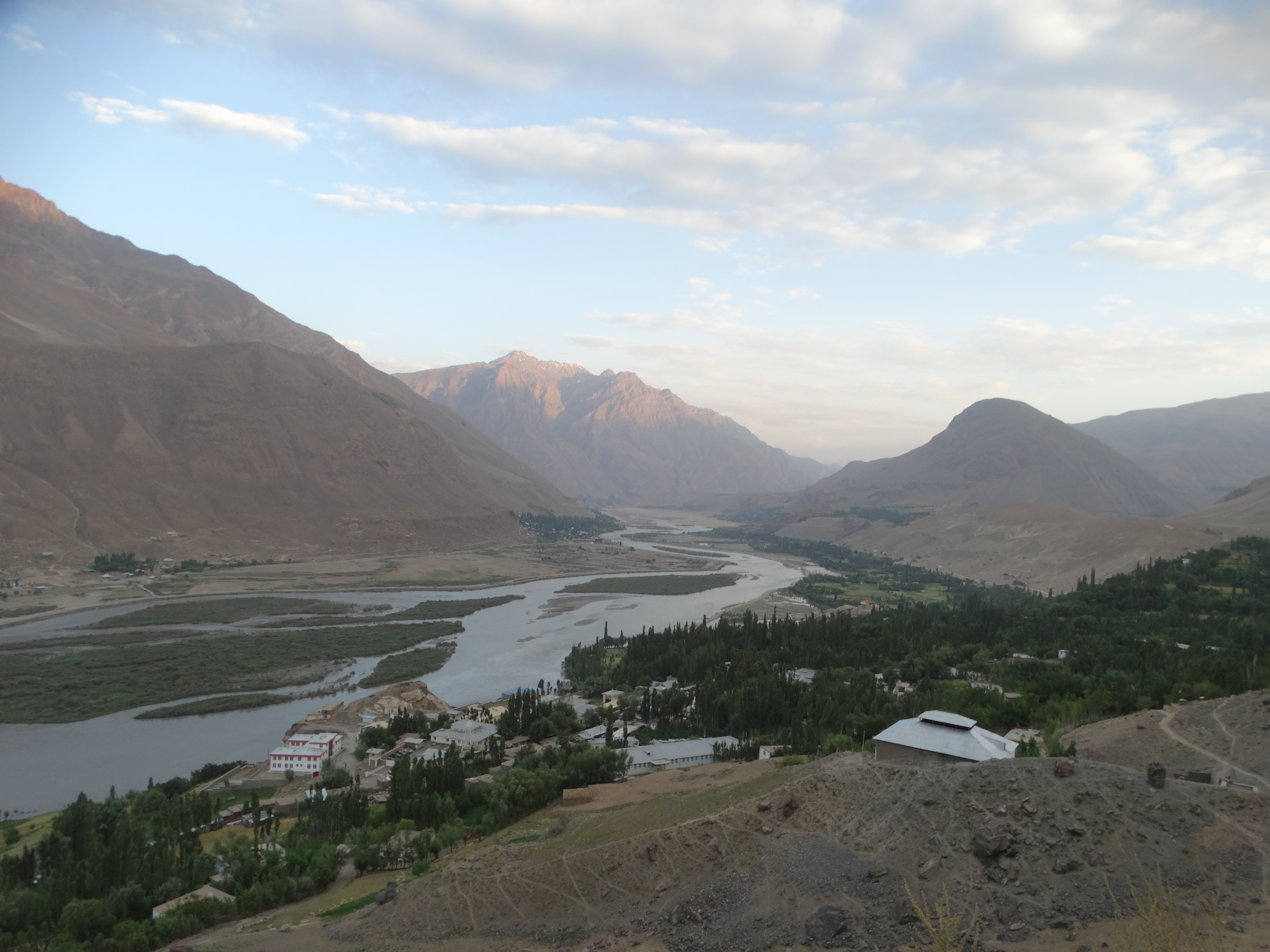
- Panj Valley close to Qala-i-Panjah (2019)

- Location in Afghanistan
- Coordinates: 37°0′N 72°19′E
- Country: Afghanistan
- Province: Badakhshan
- District: Wakhan
- Elevation: 9,167 ft (2,794 m)
- Time zone: UTC+04:30 (Afghanistan Time)

Qala-i-Panjah (Dari: قلعه پنجه), also written Qila-e Panjeh and Qala Panja, is a village in the Wakhan District of Badakhshan Province in northeastern Afghanistan. It lies on the Panj River, near the confluence of the Wakhan River and the Pamir River. The village and rest of the territory south of the Afghanistan–Tajikistan border is patrolled by the Afghan National Police and Afghan National Army. The town of Khandud is to the southwest of Qala-i-Panjah, and much further to the northeast is Gazkhan.

Qala-i-Panjah was once the capital of the Wakhan Mirdom. The former hunting lodge of Mohammad Zahir Shah, the last king of Afghanistan, is near the village. Qala-i-Panjah also contains the shrine of Panja Shah.

The village is inhabited by Wakhi people. The population of the village was reported at 640 over two decades ago. A recent report indicates that about 108 families reside in the village.

== See also ==
- Valleys of Afghanistan
