= Wakhan District =

Wakhan واخان
- District
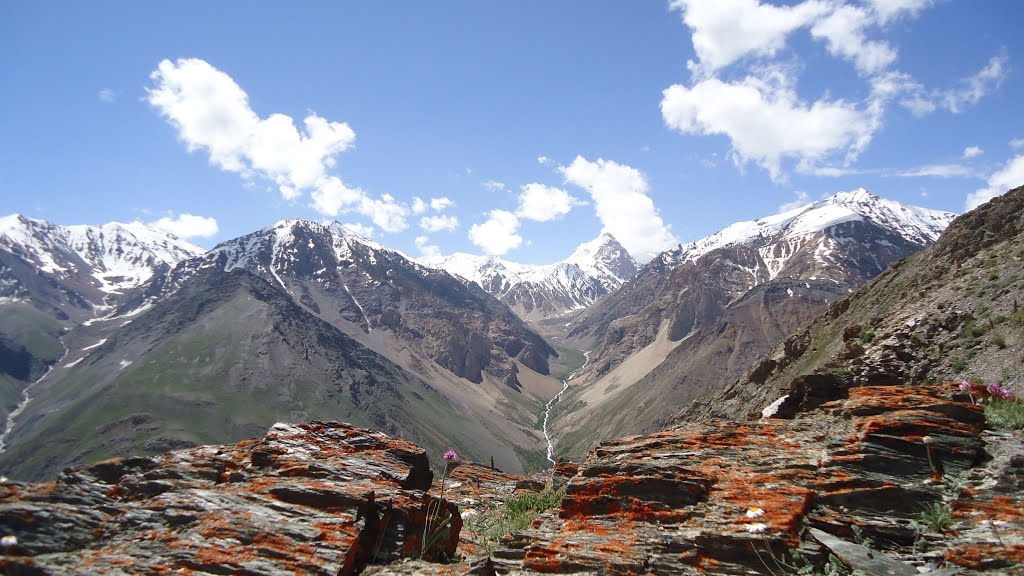
- A scenery in Wakhan

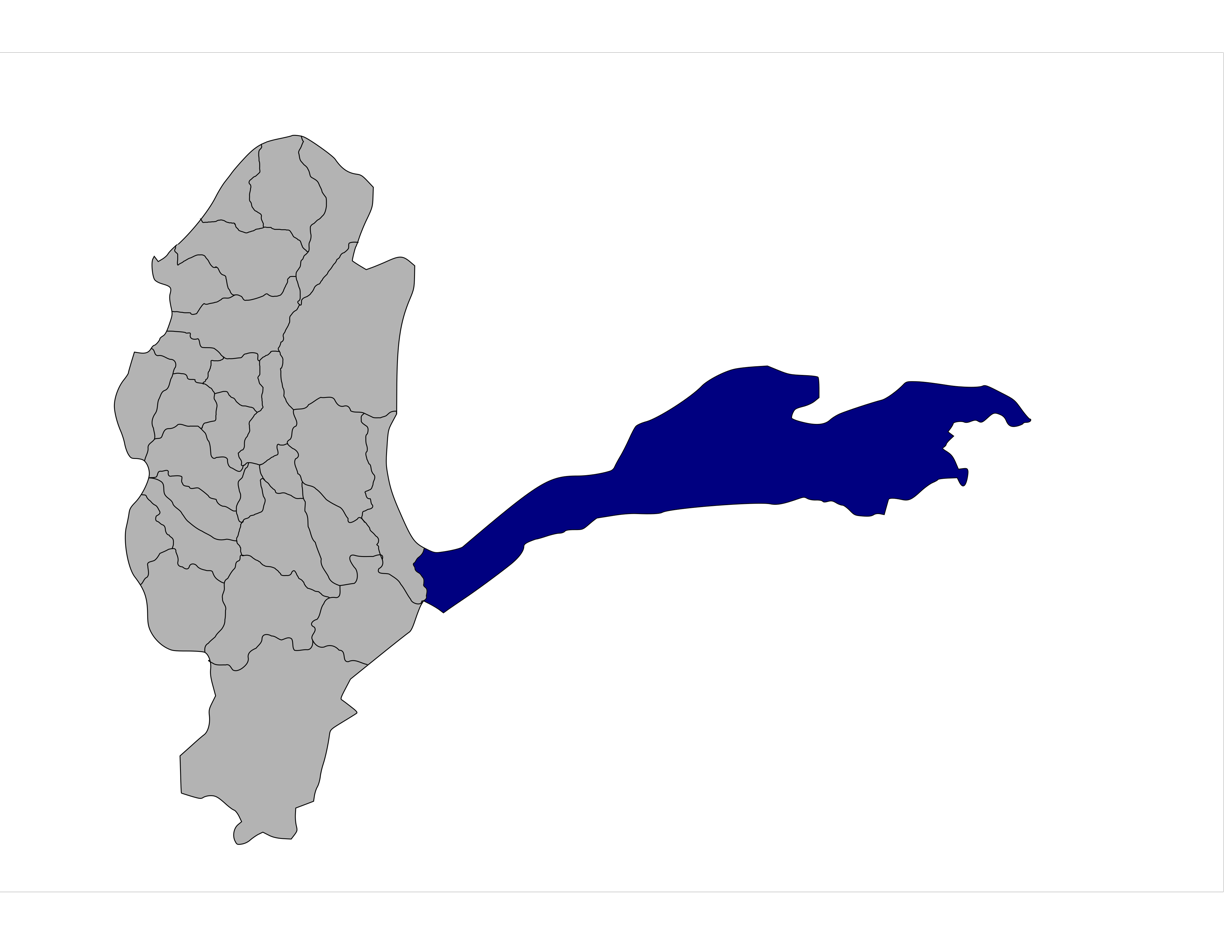
- The location of Wakhan District within Badakhshan Province
- Coordinates: 37°07′45″N 73°37′07″E
- Country: Afghanistan
- Province: Badakhshan Province
- Capital: Khandud

Government
  - Type: District
  - District Governor: Mawlavi Wajuddin Mazhari

Area
  - Land: 4,347 sq mi (11,258 km^{2})

Population
  - Estimate (2025): 17,213
- Time zone: UTC+04:30 (Afghanistan Time)

Wakhan District (Note: Dari: ولسوالی واخان, Wuluswālī-i-Wākhān; Pashto: واخان ولسوالۍ, Wākhān Wələswālai; Wakhi: ووښ, Wux̌, [wux]; Pamiri Kyrgyz: واخان, Wahan) is one of the 28 districts of Badakhshan province in eastern Afghanistan. It has an estimated population of about 17,213 people, mostly ethnic Wakhis, Pamiris and Kyrghyz. The town of Khandud serves as the district's capital. Mawlavi Wajuddin Mazhari is the current district governor.

The district of Wakhan has an area of approximately 11,258 km^{2} (4,347 sq mi), which includes the whole of Wakhan National Park and parts of Noshaq and Zorkul. There is a gravel road that passes in the district. It starts from Ishkashim in neighboring Ishkashim District in the west and ends at the Wakhjir Pass (Afghanistan–China border) in the far east. The closest major airport is Fayzabad Airport in the city of Fayzabad. All parts of the district are patrolled by the Afghan National Police and Afghan Armed Forces. Foreigners are required to have an Afghan visa, including a special permission letter from Afghanistan's Ministry of Information and Culture.

To the north of Wakhan is the Gorno-Badakhshan autonomous region of Tajikistan, to the east is the Xinjiang region of China, and to the south is Pakistan's Khyber Pakhtunkhwa and Gilgit-Baltistan.

== History ==
The Wakhan District, previously part of Wakhan Mirdom, became a part of Afghanistan after the signing of the 1893 Durand Line Agreement and the 1895 Pamir Boundary Commission protocols, in which the Russian troops had all withdrawn from Bazai Gumbad and Wakhan became a buffer zone between Tsarist Russia and British India.

The district has been closed to regular traffic for over a century and there is no modern, asphalted road. There is a rough road from Ishkashim to Sarhad, Afghanistan built in the 1960s and improved in the 2020s, but only rough paths beyond. These paths run some 100 km (60 mi) from the road end to the Chinese border at Wakhjir Pass, and further to the far end of the Little Pamir.

Jacob Townsend has speculated on the possibility of drug smuggling from Afghanistan to China via the Wakhan Corridor and Wakhjir Pass, but concluded that due to the difficulties of travel and border crossings, it would be minor compared to that conducted via Tajikistan's Gorno-Badakhshan Autonomous Province or through Pakistan, both having much more accessible routes into China.

The remoteness of the region has meant that, despite the long-running wars of Afghanistan since the late 1970s, the region has remained virtually untouched by conflict, and many locals, mostly composed of ethnic Pamir and Kyrgyz, are not aware of the wars in the country.

The Islamic Republic of Afghanistan asked the People's Republic of China on several occasions to open the border in the Wakhan Corridor for economic reasons or as an alternative supply route for fighting the Taliban insurgency. The Chinese resisted, largely due to unrest in its far western province of Xinjiang, which borders the corridor. In December 2009, it was reported that the United States had asked China to open the corridor.

In July 2021, the area came under the Taliban control for the first time during the group's summer offensive. It was reported that hundreds of ethnic Kyrgyz nomads along with their livestock attempted to flee north into Tajikistan. The corridor is patrolled by forces of the Islamic Emirate of Afghanistan, which took over responsibility from the previous NATO-trained Afghan National Security Forces.

As of June 2023, there had been discussions between the foreign ministers of China and Afghanistan concerning the opening of the strategically significant corridor to enhance the trade ties between Beijing and Kabul. Afghanistan's Foreign Minister Amir Khan Muttaqi and Chinese Foreign Minister Wang Yi both met on the sidelines in Tibet during the third Trans-Himalaya Forum for International Cooperation, to discuss the possibilities of improving trade ties. Though the Taliban government finished a 50-km road through the corridor to reach the Chinese border, Beijing seems disinclined to open the border, due to security concerns. By 2025, China had also constructed a high, green fence along the border. The Taliban has been highly secretive about the construction of the road, but the road and its approaches appeared to improve trade and living standards substantially for the Corridor's native inhabitants, according to one Austrian journalist.

In 2024 an independent analysis conducted at the University of Texas at Austin which relied on open source intelligence suggested the corridor consists of, "primarily dirt roads and footpaths that abruptly end before reaching the border."

== Towns and villages ==
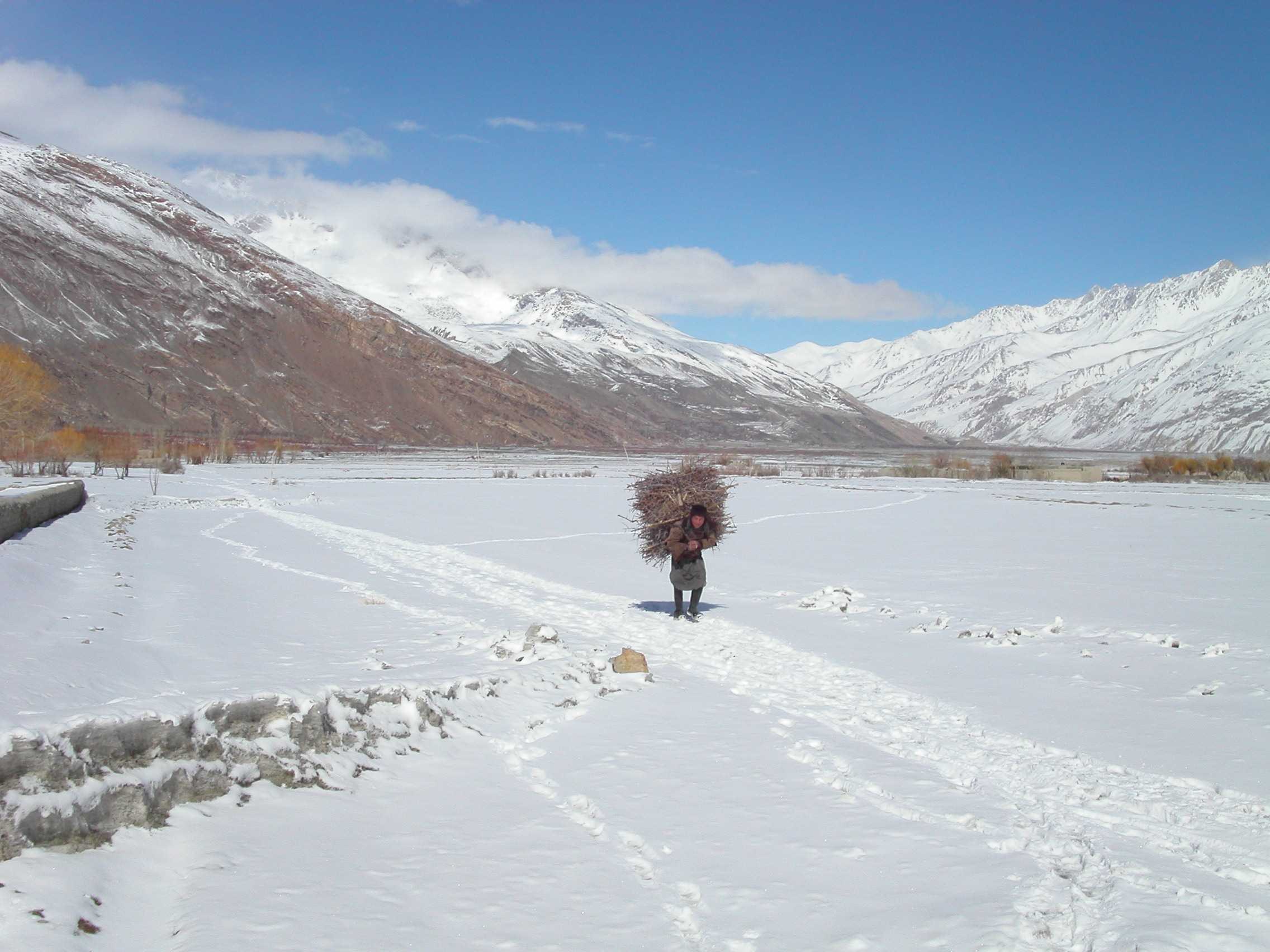
Winter in Wakhan

It was reported in 2008 that the district of Wakhan had 110 villages and 16 public schools.

- Bazai Gumbad
- Gazkhan
- Khandud
- Qala-i-Panjah
- Qazideh
- Sarhad

== Health ==
There is at least one health clinic in Wakhan.

== Economy ==
The people of Wakhan are mostly villagers and involved in agriculture, trade, transport, security, and tourism. Some go to work in Kabul or other Afghan cities.

== See also ==
- Districts of Afghanistan
- Tourism in Afghanistan
