= Wakhi people =

Iranian ethnic group native to Central and South Asia

Wakhis
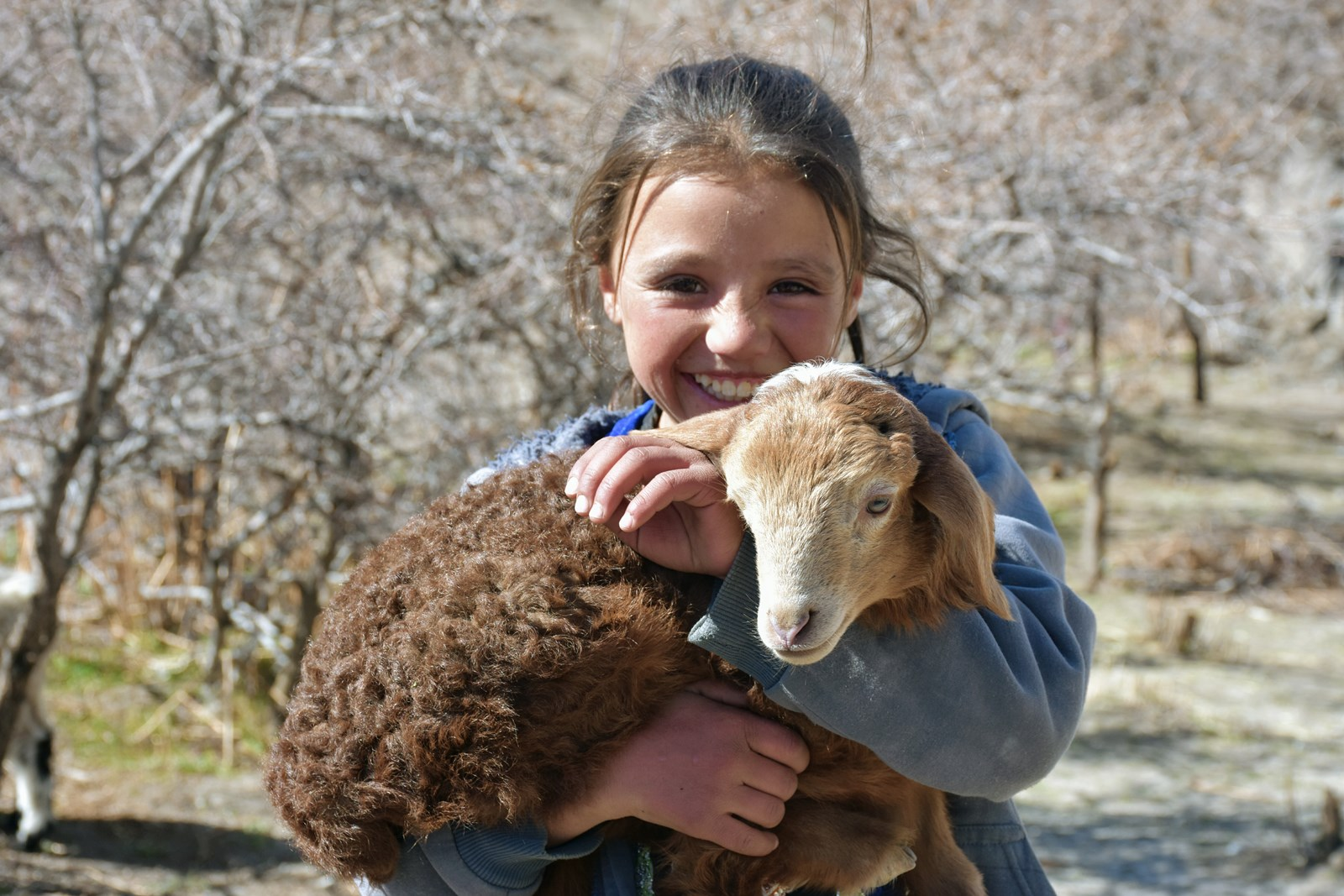
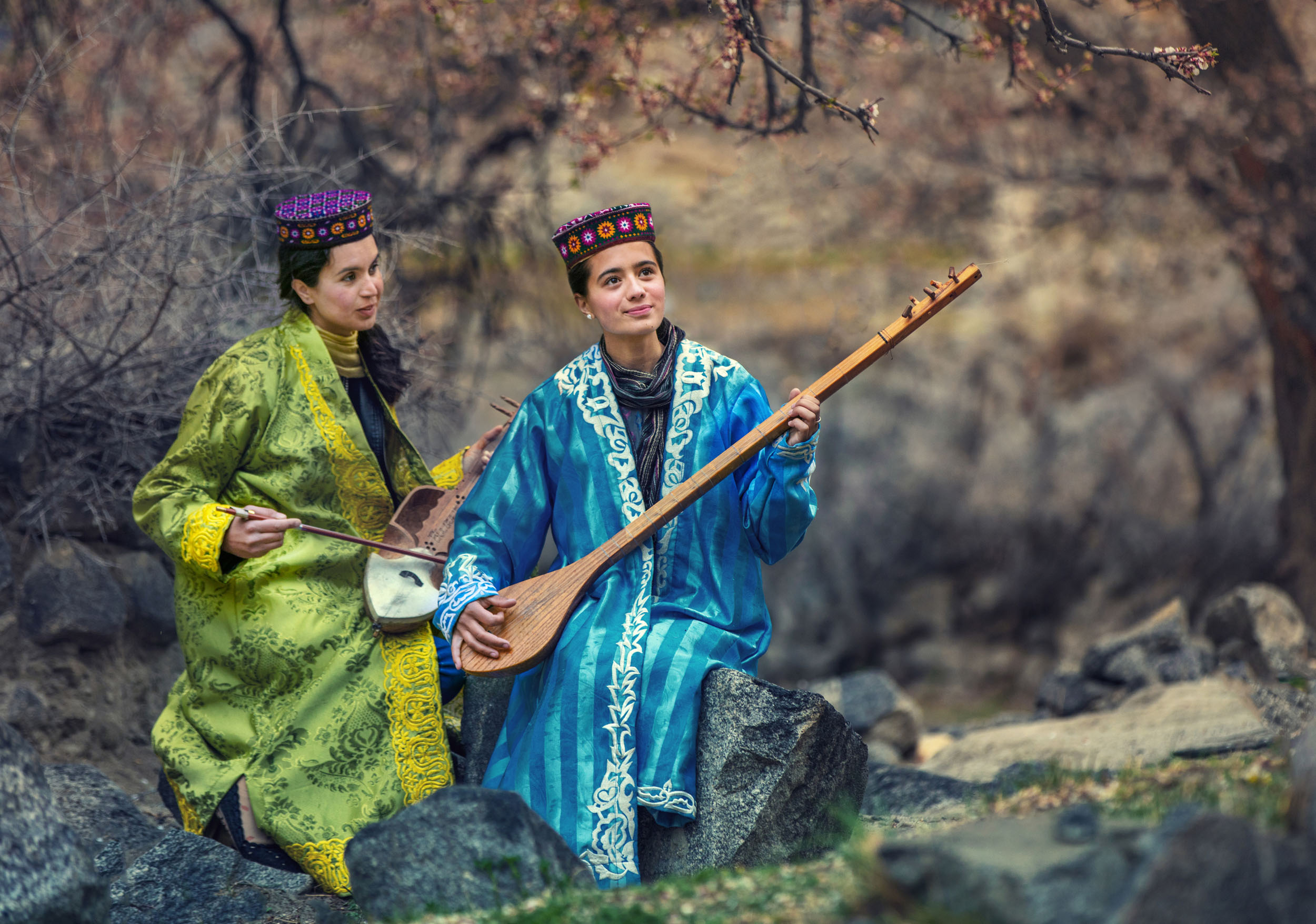
- Top: Shepherdess photographed in Chipursan; Bottom: Wakhi musicians photographed in Gulmit, Gilgit-Baltistan, Pakistan, wearing iraghi hats and playing rubab (right) and ghizhek (left), c. 2018

Total population
- 72,000 (2018)

Regions with significant populations
- Pakistan: 22,500 (2018)
- Afghanistan: 17,500 (2018)
- Tajikistan: 24,000 (2018)
- China: 8,000 (2018)

Languages
- Wakhi

Religion
- Predominantly Islam (Isma'ili Shia)

Related ethnic groups
- Other Iranian peoples

The Wakhi people, (Note: English: /ˈwɑːxi/ WAHKH-ee; Wakhi: ښیک مَردَمِش, romanized: X̌ik mardamiš, cyrillized: Х̆ик мардамиш, pronounced [xik maɾdaˈmiʃ]; Persian: مردمان وخی, romanized: mardumān-i Wakhī, cyrillized: мардумони Вахӣ, pronounced [mɐɾdʊˈmɑːnɪ wɐˈxiː]; Pashto: واخي وګړي, romanized: Wāxi wəgəṛay, pronounced [wɑˈxi wəɡəˈɻɐɪ]; Russian: Ваханцы, romanized: Vahancy, pronounced [vɐˈxant͡sɨ]; Chinese: 瓦汗 or 瓦罕; pinyin: Wǎhàn or Wǎhǎn; Cantonese Yale: Ngáhhohn or Ngáhhón; Dungan: Вахан or وَاخًا) also locally referred to as the Wokhik, (Note: Urdu: وخیک) are an Iranic ethnic group native to Central and South Asia. They are found in Afghanistan, Tajikistan, Pakistan, and China — primarily in and around Wakhan Corridor in Afghanistan, the northernmost part of Gilgit-Baltistan and Chitral in Pakistan, Gorno-Badakhshan in Tajikistan and the southwestern areas of Xinjiang in China. The Wakhi people are native speakers of the Wakhi language, an Eastern Iranian language.

== Name ==
A Wakhi man in Hunza, Gilgit-Baltistan, Pakistan, wearing traditional pakol hat, 2025.

The Wakhi people refer to themselves as Khik and to their language as Khik zik. The exonym Wakhī, which is given to them by their neighbours, is based on Wux̌, the local name of the region of Wakhan, deriving from *Waxšu, the old name of the Oxus River (Amu Darya), which is a major river formed by the junction of the Vakhsh and Panj rivers on the border between Tajikistan and Afghanistan.

== Demographics ==
The Wakhi population was estimated to be c. 50,000–60,000 in 2015. According to a 2018 estimate, ethnic Wakhi-speakers have a total population of about 72,000, divided among Tajikistan (24,000 people), Pakistan (22,500 people), Afghanistan (17,500 people) and China (8,000 people). The machinations of The Great Game during the eighteenth and nineteenth century created boundaries which separated the large body of the Wakhis into living in four countries.

== Distribution ==
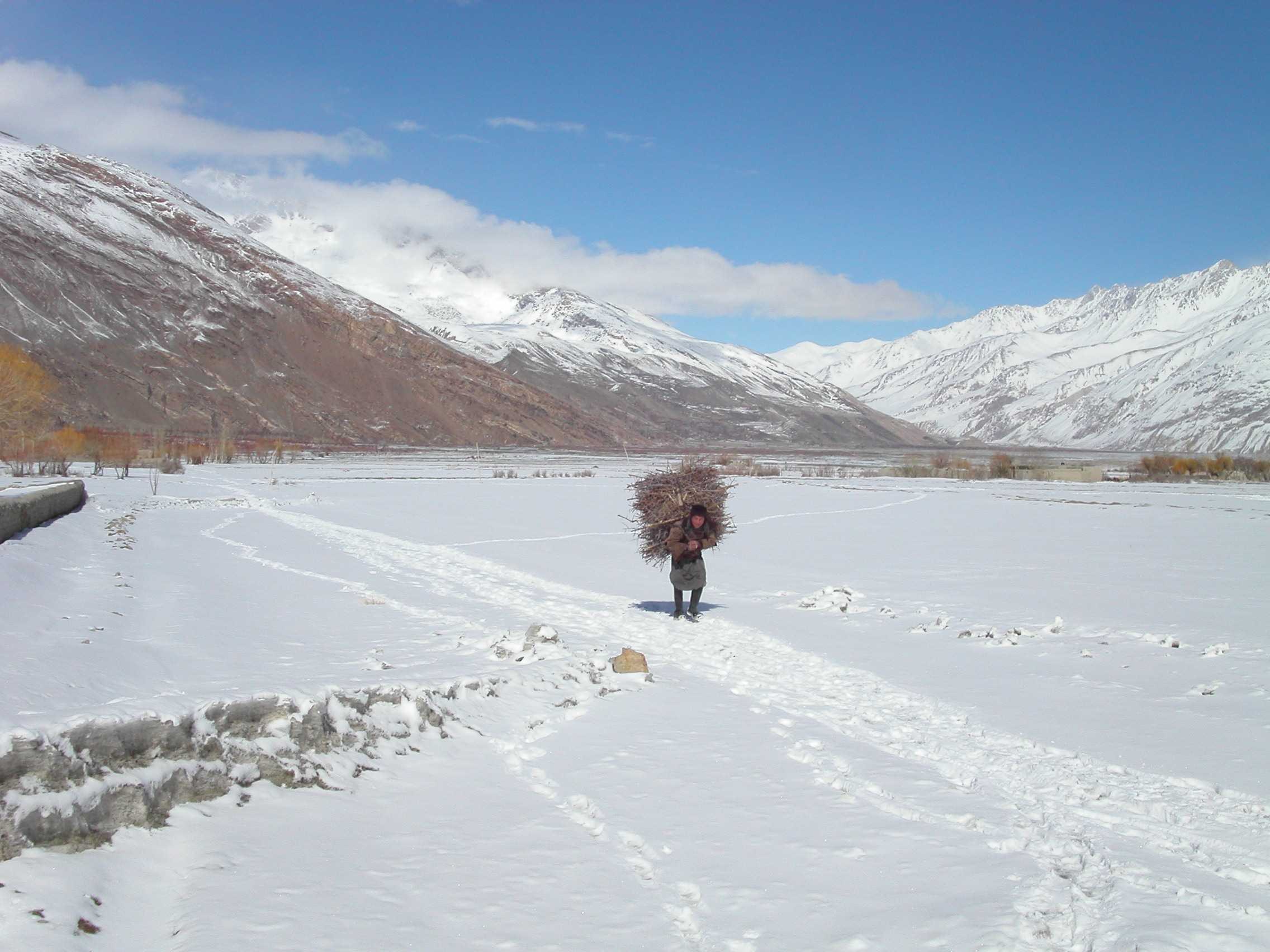
The Wakhan Corridor under light snow, with a Wakhi man collecting firewood.

In Gilgit-Baltistan, northern Pakistan, Wakhi predominantly live in the upper region of Hunza popularly known as Gojal. Wakhi speakers also live in Ishkoman Valley of Ghizer District, and some villages of Yasin Valley. In Pakistan, Wakhi also live in Borogol in Chitral District of Khyber Pakhtunkhwa province. In Pakistan, they refer to themselves as "Wakhi" or "Pamiri" or "Gujali". Wakhi people of Chitral also identify as "Chitrali" (Chetrari) outside of the region.

In Tajikistan, Wakhi are inhabitants of Roshtqal'a District and Ishkoshim District of Gorno-Badakhshan Autonomous Region. In Tajikistan, they are recognized by the state as "Tajiks", but self-identify as "Pamiri".

In Afghanistan, Wakhi primarily live in the Wakhan District of Badakhshan Province. In Afghanistan, they are officially called "Pamiri".

In China, Wakhi are inhabitants of Taxkorgan Tajik Autonomous County, an administrative area within Kashgar Prefecture of Xinjiang, mainly in the township of Dafdar. The Wakhi people, together with the Sarikoli people, are officially recognized as "Tajiks", with ethnic-minority autonomous status.

== Religion ==
The Wakhi predominantly adhere to Nizari Isma'ili Sh'ia Islam, which is regarded as their ethnic religion, and are followers of the Aga Khan.

== Economy ==
The Wakhi are primarily nomadic, depending on their herds of yaks and horses. They often have two residences — one for winter and one for summer. Their houses are built of stone and sod.

== Culture ==
Activists and researchers have been working to preserve and record the language of the Wakhi people, and have developed Wakhi orthographies using the Arabic, Cyrillic, and Latin scripts.

In 1990, the Gojali Wakhis of Pakistan established the Wakhi Tajik Cultural Association to preserve, document, and publish their local culture. The association introduced a script that was applied into linguistic and literary textbooks, and organized cultural festivals. Radio Pakistan's Radio Gilgit also aired a daily Wakhi-language program named Bam-e Dunya ("Roof of the World").

== See also ==
- Afroze-Numa
- Shughnis

== Bibliography ==
- Felmy, Sabine (1996). The Voice of the Nightingale: A Personal Account of the Wakhi Culture in Hunza. New York: Oxford University Press. ISBN 0-19-577599-6.
- Shahrani, M. Nazif (1979). The Kirghiz and Wakhi of Afghanistan: Adaptation to Closed Frontiers and War. Seattle: University of Washington Press. ISBN 0-295-95669-0.; 1st paperback edition with new preface and epilogue (2002), ISBN 0-295-98262-4.
