= Wakhan =

Region in Afghanistan and Tajikistan

Coordinates: 37.129240°N 73.618680°E

Wakhan (Dari (Note: Dari pronunciation: [wɑː.xɑ́ːn]); Pashto (Note: Pashto pronunciation: [wɑ.xɑn]): واخان), also spelt as Vakhan and Vakhon (Tajik (Note: Tajik pronunciation: [vä.χɔn]): Вахон), is a rugged, mountainous part of the Pamir Mountains, Hindu Kush and Karakoram ranges in Afghanistan and Tajikistan. Today most of Wakhan is part of Wakhan District, Badakhshan Province in northeastern Afghanistan, rest being in Gorno-Badakhshan in Tajikistan.

== History ==
Historically, the Wakhan has been an important region for thousands of years as it is where the western and eastern portions of Central Asia meet. As a source of major rivers flowing toward Central Asia, Wakhan has been an important part of many powerful Islamic empires such as the Samanid Empire, Ghaznavid Empire, Ghurid Empire, Khwarazmian Empire, Timurid Empire and so on. This mountainous terrain was historically used as one of the trade routes between Kabul and Kashgar.

=== Ancient history ===
Western Wakhan (休密 Xiumi) is believed to have been conquered in the early part of the 1st century CE by Kujula Kadphises, the first "Great Kushan," and was one of the five xihou or principalities that formed the nucleus of the original Kushan kingdom. Wakhan was administered by the Kushan indirectly through semi-independent rulers who oversaw trade on the Buddhist Route of the Silk Road.

Although the terrain is extremely rugged, the Corridor was historically used as a trading route between Kabul and Kashgar. It appears that Alexander the Great, Song Yun, Huisheng, Xuanzang, Marco Polo, and many others came this way. The Portuguese Jesuit priest Bento de Goes crossed from the Wakhan to China between 1602 and 1606.

Early travellers used one of three routes:

- A northern route led up the valley of the Pamir River to Zorkul Lake, then east through the mountains to the valley of the Bartang River, then across the Sarikol Range to China.
- A southern route led up the valley of the Wakhan River to the Wakhjir Pass to China. This pass is closed for at least five months a year and is only open irregularly for the remainder.
- A central route branched off the southern route through the Little Pamir to the Murghab River valley.

=== Wakhan Mirdom ===
Until 1883 Wakhan was a semi-independent principality on both sides of the Panj and Pamir Rivers, ruled by a hereditary ruler (mir) with its capital at Qala-i-Panjah. It was a tributary to Badakhshan, which itself was a tributary state of Qing China. However, in the 1750s when the Qing dynasty conquered the Dzungar Khanate, Wakhan and Shighnan were incorporated into the Qing dynasty. The Khanate of Kokand eventually annexed Wakhan and Shighnan from Qing China by the 1830s.

The area was visited under Russian supervision by Thomas Edward Gordon in 1874, and in 1891 by Francis Younghusband, followed by Lord Curzon in 1894. While visiting Wakhan in May 1906, Aurel Stein reported that 100 pony loads of goods crossed annually to China.

In 1891, during the Russian conquest of Central Asia, government forces from the Russian Empire had occupied Wakhan by stationing troops in Bazai Gumbad. A British national by the name of Francis Younghusband, who was traveling from Kashgar back to British India, was detained by the stationed Russian troops for having no visa or permission letter.

=== Conquest by Emirate of Afghanistan ===
Agreements between Afghan, British and Russian rulers in the late 19th century effectively split the historic area of Wakhan by making the Panj River the border between the Emirate of Afghanistan and the Russian Empire. On its south side, the Durand Line Agreement of 1893 marked the boundary between the governments of British India and Afghanistan. Abdur Rahman Khan, the Emir of Afghanistan, imposed Afghan rule on the Wakhan. The last Mir of Wakhan fled with a quarter of Wakhi population to Chitral, whose ruler settled the refugees in Ishkoman; many Wakhis were also forced to migrate to Hunza and Sarikol following the acquisition of Wakhan by Afghans.

=== Modern history ===
In 1949, when Mao Zedong completed the Communist takeover of China, the borders were permanently closed, sealing off the 2,000-year-old caravan route and turning the corridor into a cul-de-sac. When the Soviets invaded Afghanistan in December 1979, they occupied Afghanistan's Wakhan and built military posts at Sarhad and elsewhere. To facilitate access they built a bridge across the Pamir River at Prip, near Gazkhan. However, the area did not see fighting.

In 2010 Wakhan was reported to be peaceful and unaffected by the war in the rest of Afghanistan.

At a cost of 365 million afghanis (US$5.5 million), the Taliban opened a 121 km (75 mi) gravel transit road from Broghil to the Wakhjir Pass in 2026. However, because of seasonal snow and the lack of a Chinese border crossing, the route was still closed to international traffic as of 2026.

== Geography ==
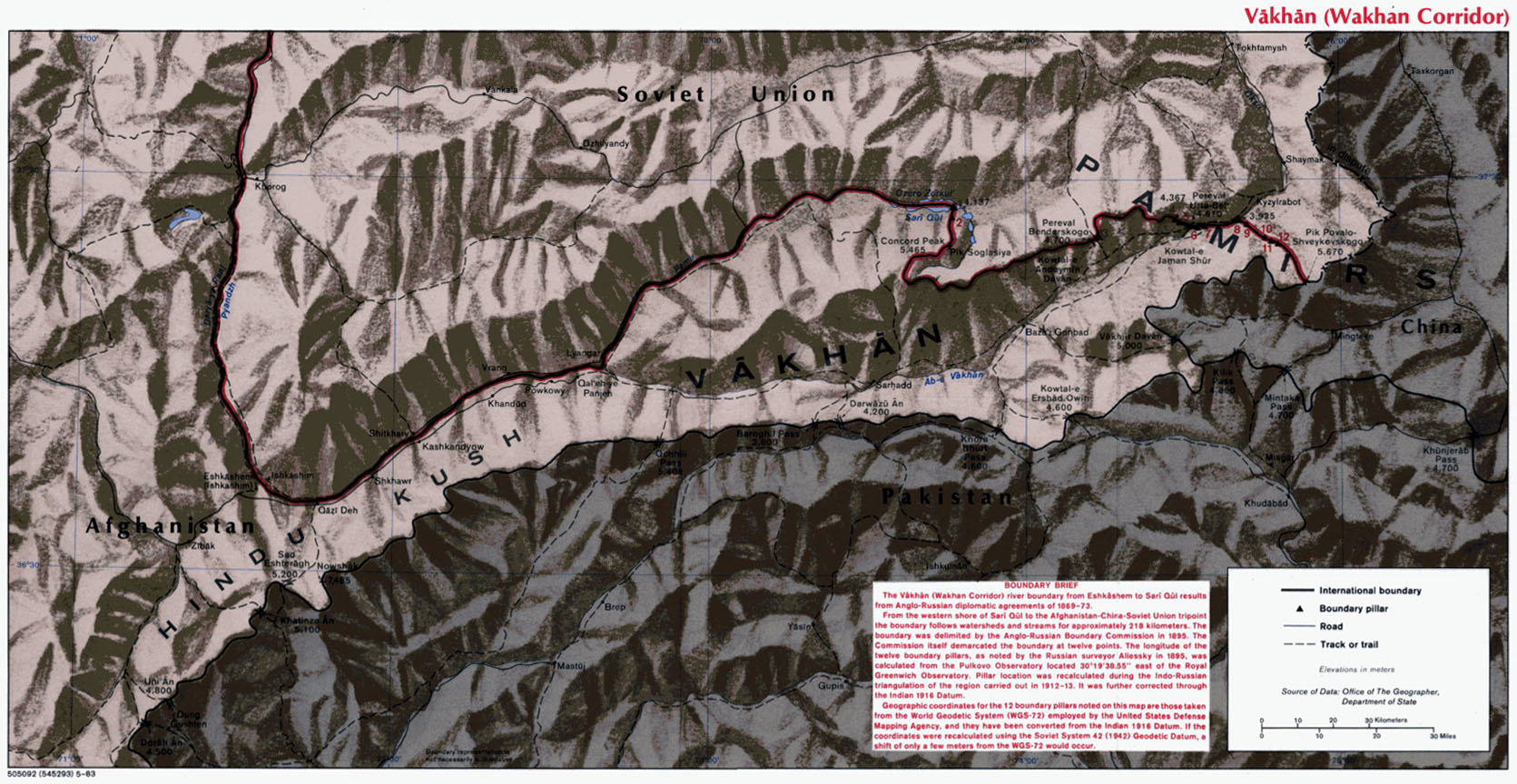
The Wakhan and surrounding areas along the border of Afghanistan and Tajikistan

The Wakhan is located in the extreme north-east of Afghanistan. It contains the headwaters of the Amu Darya (Oxus) River, and was an ancient corridor for travelers from the Tarim Basin to Badakhshan. The geographic position of Wakhan between China, Hindustan, and Bactria allowed it to play a major role in trade in the ancient world.

Until 1883, Wakhan included the valley of the Panj River and the Pamir River, as well as the upper flows of the Wakhan River. An 1873 agreement between British Raj and the Russian Empire split the Wakhan region by delimiting spheres of influence for the two governments at the Panj and Pamir rivers. Since then, the name Wakhan is now generally used to refer to the Afghan area south of the two rivers. The northern part of the historic Wakhan is now part of the Gorno-Badakhshan Autonomous Province in Tajikistan. There is a gravel road from Ishkashim, passing through Khandud, Qala-i-Panjah, Gazkhan, Sarhad, Bazai Gumbad until it reaches the Wakhjir Pass, which is on the Afghanistan–China border.

The western part of the Wakhan, between Ishkashim and Qala-i-Panjah, is known by some as Lower Wakhan, which includes the valley of the Panj River. The valleys of the Wakhan River, the Pamir River and their tributaries, and the terrain between, are known as Upper Wakhan.

The eastern extremity of Upper Wakhan is known as the Pamir Knot, the area where the Himalayas, Tian Shan, Karakoram, Kunlun, and Hindu Kush ranges meet. West of the Pamir Knot is the Little Pamir, a broad U-shaped grassy valley 100 km (62 mi) long and 10 km (6.2 mi) wide, which contains the Chaqmaqtin Lake, the headwaters of the Aksu or Murghab River. At the eastern end of the Little Pamir is the Tegermansu Valley, from where the closed Tegermansu Pass (4,827 m (15,837 ft)) leads to China. The Great Pamir or Big Pamir, a 60 km (37 mi) long valley south of the Zorkul Lake, drained by the Pamir River, lies to the northwest of the Little Pamir.

The mountain range that divides the two Pamirs is known as the Nicholas Range. West of the Nicholas Range, between the Great Pamir and the lower valley of the Wakhan River, is the Wakhan Range, which culminates in the Koh-e Pamir (6,320 m (20,730 ft)).

The roads in the region have small shrines to Isma'ili Muslim pirs and are adorned with "special stones and curled ibex and sheep horns", which are symbols of purity in the Zoroastrian faiths, once present in the region before the arrival of Islam.

Climate data for Wakhan
Month	Jan	Feb	Mar	Apr	May	Jun	Jul	Aug	Sep	Oct	Nov	Dec	Year
Mean daily maximum °C (°F)	−18.9 (−2.0)	−15.4 (4.3)	−10.2 (13.6)	−5.1 (22.8)	−0.2 (31.6)	6.2 (43.2)	14.1 (57.4)	15.1 (59.2)	10.3 (50.5)	−1.7 (28.9)	−11.9 (10.6)	−18.0 (−0.4)	−3.0 (26.6)
Daily mean °C (°F)	−23.2 (−9.8)	−19.8 (−3.6)	−15.5 (4.1)	−10.9 (12.4)	−6.0 (21.2)	0.7 (33.3)	8.3 (46.9)	9.3 (48.7)	4.3 (39.7)	−8.5 (16.7)	−17.6 (0.3)	−22.4 (−8.3)	−8.4 (16.8)
Mean daily minimum °C (°F)	−27.4 (−17.3)	−24.2 (−11.6)	−20.8 (−5.4)	−16.7 (1.9)	−11.8 (10.8)	−4.9 (23.2)	2.5 (36.5)	3.4 (38.1)	−1.8 (28.8)	−15.3 (4.5)	−23.2 (−9.8)	−26.7 (−16.1)	−13.9 (7.0)
Average precipitation mm (inches)	48 (1.9)	63 (2.5)	79 (3.1)	70 (2.8)	53 (2.1)	24 (0.9)	27 (1.1)	22 (0.9)	25 (1.0)	35 (1.4)	42 (1.7)	45 (1.8)	533 (21.0)
Average relative humidity (%)	66	71	74	75	81	74	54	46	43	63	68	66	65
Mean monthly sunshine hours	164.3	156.6	210.8	234	248	252	313.1	316.2	294	226.3	174	167.4	2,756.7
Source: Climate-Data.org, NASA Power (Extremes)

=== Wakhan Corridor ===
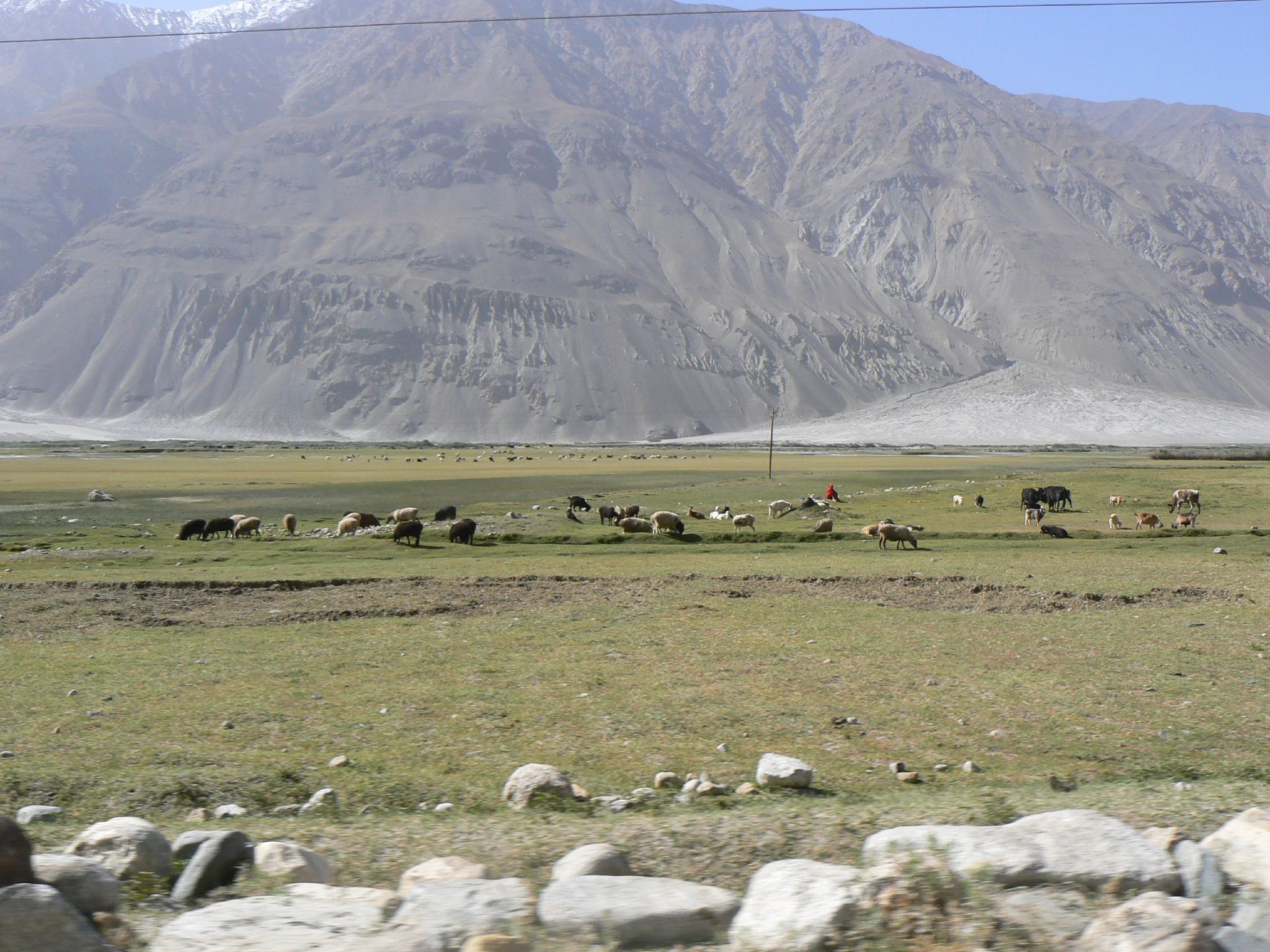
Wakhan between Afghanistan and Tajikistan

The Wakhan is connected to Tashkurgan Tajik County, China, by a long, narrow strip called the Wakhan Corridor, which separates the Gorno-Badakhshan region of Tajikistan from Khyber Pakhtunkhwa and Gilgit-Baltistan in Pakistan. (Note: India also claims to have a border with Afghanistan's Wakhan Corridor in its northwest due to its claim on Kashmir. (See Borders of India#Land borders of India.))

The Wakhan River flows through the corridor from the east to Qala-i-Panjah where it joins the Pamir River to become the Panj River which then forms the larger Amu Darya River.

In the south the corridor is bordered by the high mountains of the Hindu Kush, crossed by the Broghil Pass, the Irshad Pass and the disused Dilisang Pass to Pakistan.

The corridor is, in part, a political creation from the Great Game between British India and Russian Empire. In the north, an agreement between the empires in 1873 effectively split the historic region of Wakhan by making the Panj and Pamir Rivers the border between Afghanistan and the then-Russian Empire. In the south, the Durand Line Agreement of 1893 marked the boundary between Afghanistan and British India (now Pakistan). This left a narrow strip of land ruled by Afghanistan as a buffer zone between the two empires, which became known as the Wakhan Corridor in the 20th century.

== Demographics ==
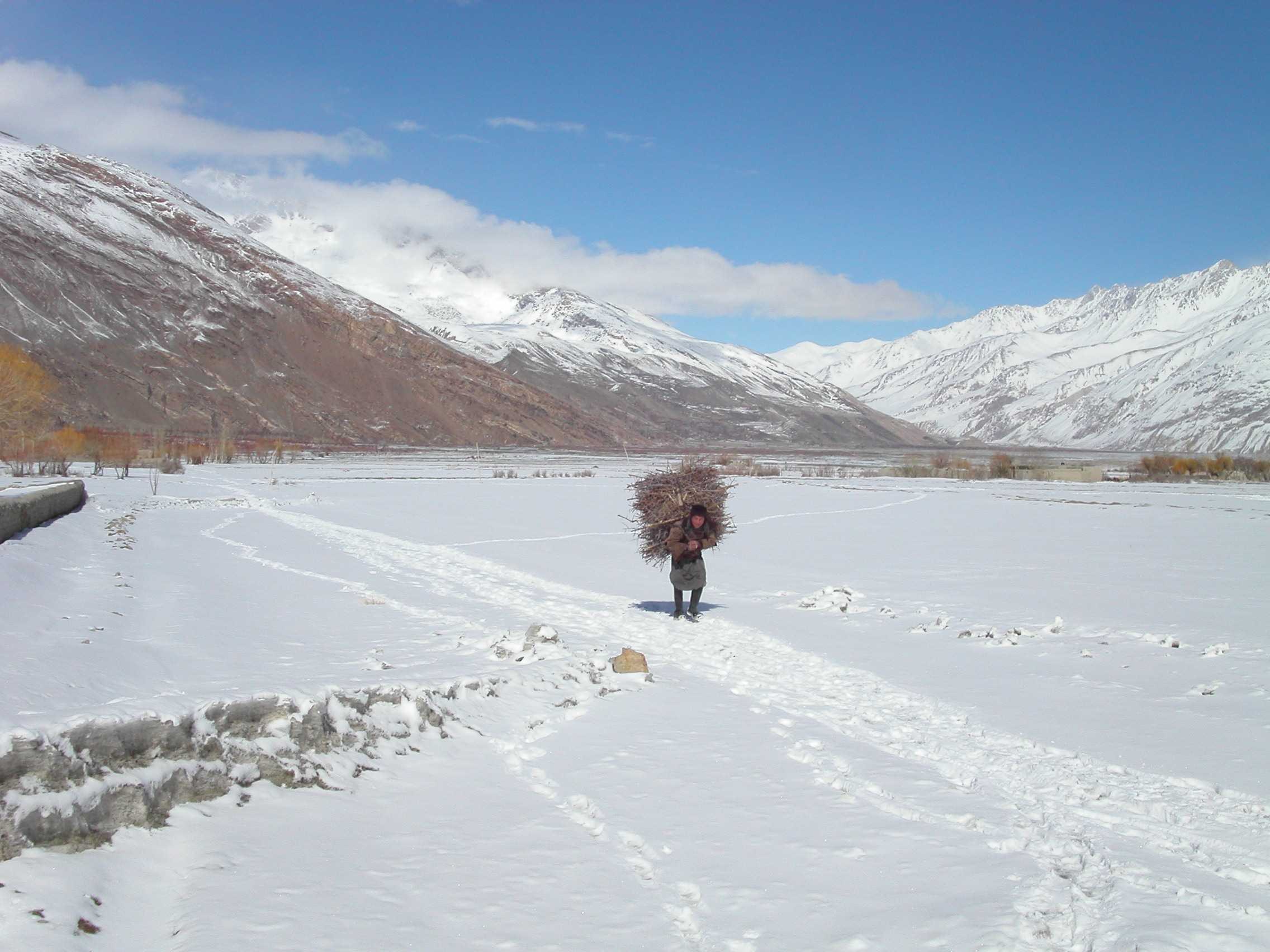
A local villager in the Wakhan District of Afghanistan

Wakhan is sparsely populated. The total population is estimated at 18,000 residents. Wakhi and Kyrgyz are the major ethnic groups of Wakhan. Its inhabitants are fluent in both Dari and Wakhi language. Nomadic Kyrgyz herders traditionally live at the higher altitudes.

According to a 2003 report by the United Nations Environment Programme and Food and Agriculture Organization, the population of Wakhan suffers from lack of education, poverty, ill health, food insecurity and opium addiction.

=== Wakhi ===
The Wakhi population of Wakh'ili was 9,444 in 2003. Almost all of them adhere to the Shia Isma'ili faith and some of them speak Wakhi language. Wakhi people also inhabit several areas adjacent to the Wakhan in Tajikistan, Pakistan and China.

The Wakhi practice agriculture in the river valleys, and herd animals in the summer pastures at higher elevations.

The dominant sect of Islam in the region is Isma'ili, much milder than the strict form of Islam generally practiced in the country. In Ishkashim, the city at the western mouth of the Wakhan, stricter observance is demanded. The area has been long neglected by the central government of Afghanistan. People are poor, many being traditional pastoralists living in yurts and lacking basic services. Non-governmental organizations such as the Aga Khan Development Network foundation have taken an interest in the area. The Central Asia Institute, founded by Greg Mortenson, has built 11 schools in the region.

There is a trickle of tourists who engage in trekking and mountaineering.

Alastair Leithead of BBC News 24 on 26 December 2007, presented a half-hour feature about Wakhan, focusing particularly on the work of the expatriate British doctor Alexander Duncan, which provided a significant piece of extended media reporting from this inaccessible area. He has also covered the Pamir Festival in the area.

=== Kyrgyz ===
The Kyrgyz population of Wakhan was 1,130 in 2003, all in the eastern part of Wakhan. The Kyrgyz are Sunni Hanafi Muslims.

The suppression of the 1916 rebellion against Russian rule in Central Asia caused many Kyrgyz to later migrate to China and Afghanistan. Most Kyrgyz refugees settled in Wakhan region of Afghanistan.

Until 1978, the northeastern portion of Wakhan (the Great Pamir and the Little Pamir) was home to about 3,000-5,000 ethnic Kyrgyz. In 1978 almost all the Kyrgyz inhabitants fled to Pakistan in the aftermath of the Saur Revolution. They requested 5,000 visas from the United States Consulate in Peshawar for resettlement in Alaska (a region that shares a similar climate and temperature with the Wakhan Corridor). Their request was denied. In the meantime, the heat and the unsanitary conditions of the refugee camp were killing the Kyrgyz refugees at an alarming rate. Turkey, which was then under the military coup rule of General Kenan Evren, stepped in, and resettled the entire group in the Lake Van region of Turkey in 1982. The village of Ulupamir (or "Great Pamir" in Kyrgyz) in Erciş on Lake Van was given to them, and more than 5,000 of them still reside today. The documentary film "37 Uses for a Dead Sheep – the story of the Pamir Kirghiz" was based on the life of these Kyrgyz/Kirgiz in their new home.

Kyrgyz from Wakhan region of Afghanistan moved to Pakistan in the 1970s. Nearly 1,100 of them were accepted by Turkey to settle in Ulupamir (or "Great Pamir" in Kyrgyz), their resettlement village in Van Province.

Some Kyrgyz returned to the Wakhan in October 1979, following the Soviet occupation of Afghanistan.

== Tourism ==
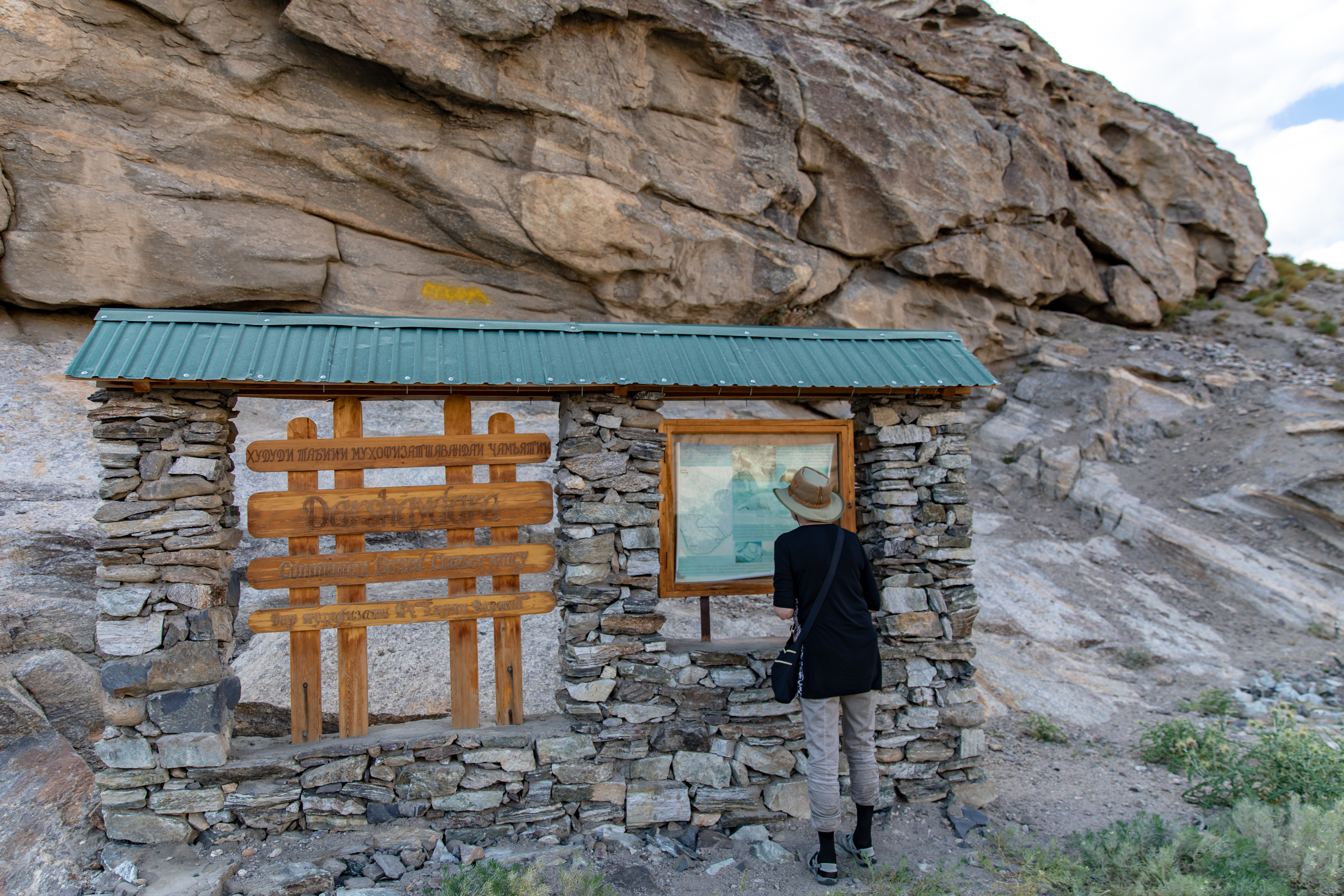
A tourist on the Tajikistan side of the Wakhan looking at an information board.

The Wakhan has attracted many adventurous climbers and trekkers, even during years when Afghanistan was at war. Three mountaineers interviewed by the BBC in February 2010 described the area as safe and peaceful. One of them, who ran a mountaineering company, insisted it was in fact the safest part of Afghanistan, though still not suitable for casual tourists. BBC correspondent John Simpson has recommended the area as a place to take a wonderful, and relatively safe, holiday. Kate Humble, a BBC television presenter, reports that the area is beautiful and the people friendly. The entire Wakhan was designated as the protected Wakhan National Park in 2014.

== Popular culture ==
The Wakhan plays a large role in Greg Mortenson's book, Stones into Schools. This book tells the story of the building of a school in the Kyrgyz village of Bazai Gumbad. The factual accuracy of this account is strongly disputed in Jon Krakauer's ebook Three Cups of Deceit.
