= Alexander Duncan =

Alexander Duncan may refer to:

- Alexander Duncan (army officer) (1780–1859), East India Company officer
- Alexander Duncan (athlete) (1884–1959), British Olympic runner
- Alexander Duncan (bishop) (1655–1733), Scottish Episcopal clergyman and bishop
- Alexander Duncan (politician) (1788–1853), U.S. Representative from Ohio
- Alexander Duncan (police officer) (1888–1965), Scottish police officer and Chief Commissioner of Victoria Police (Australia), 1937–1954
- Alex Duncan (1900–1984), former Australian rules footballer
- Alexander Duncan (doctor), British doctor who spent six years in a village high up in the Wakhan Corridor of north-eastern Afghanistan
- Alexander William Duncan (1881–1934), Scottish cricketer and rugby player
- Alexander Duncan (footballer) (1891–?), Scottish footballer
