= Bozai Gumbad =

Bozai Gumbad بزای گنبذ
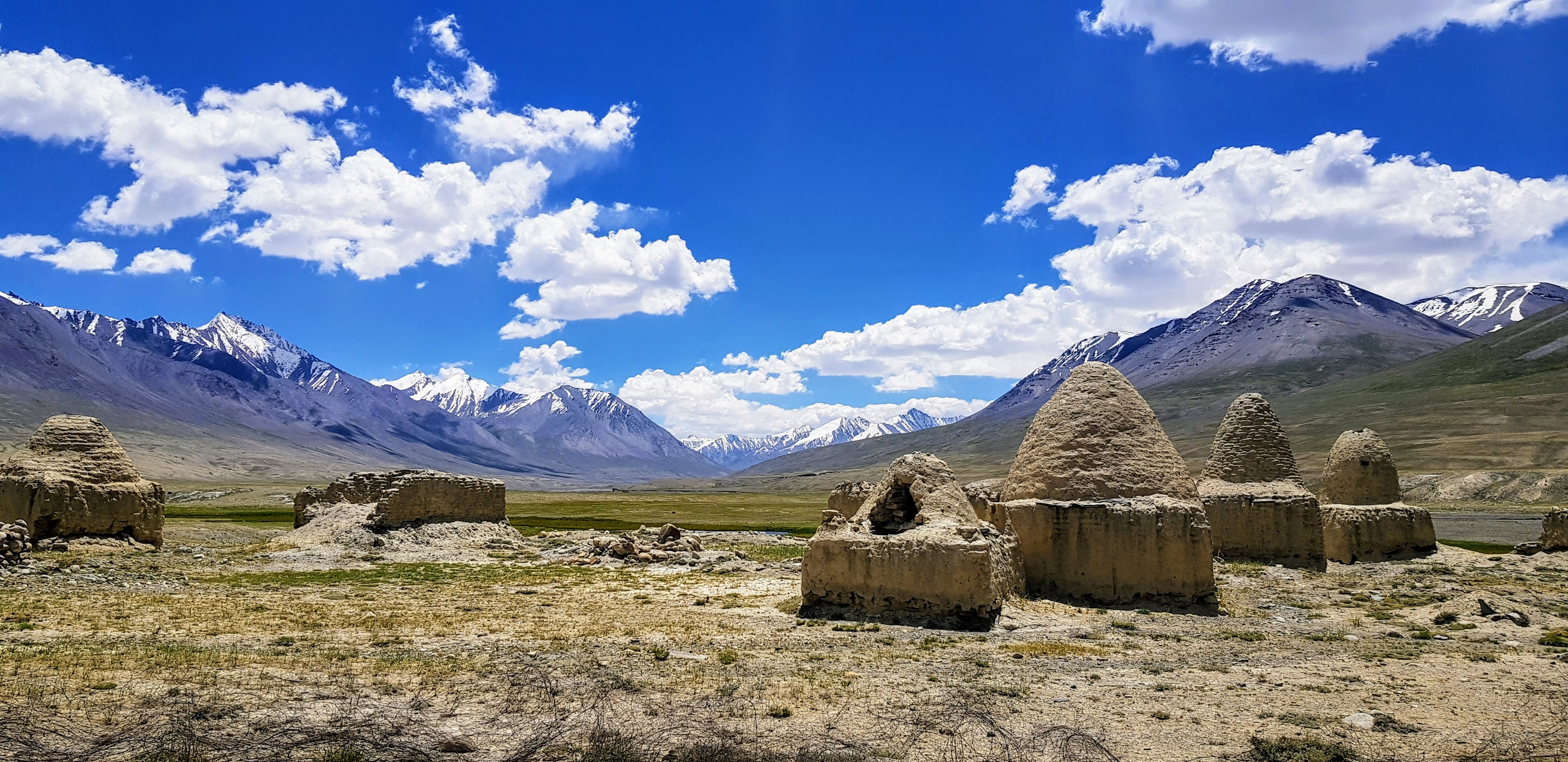
- The historical gumbads in the village

- Location in Afghanistan
- Coordinates: 37°8′0″N 74°0′0″E
- Country: Afghanistan
- Province: Badakhshan
- District: Wakhan
- Elevation: 12,910 ft (3,935 m)
- Time zone: UTC+04:30 (Afghanistan Time)

Bozai Gumbad, also reported as Bazai Gumbad, Buzai Gumbad and Bozai Gumbaz (Pashto: بزای گمبز, lit. 'domes of the elders'), is the site of domed tombs and nearby settlement of mostly ethnic Kyrgyz herders in the Wakhan District of Badakhshan Province of Afghanistan. It lies in the Little Pamir on the right bank of the Bozai River, near where it joins Wakhjir River to become the Wakhan River. It is part of the Wakhan National Park and patrolled by the Afghan National Police and Afghan Armed Forces.

Bozai Gumbad is connected by about 71 km (44 mi) long gravel road to Sarhad in the southwest, and little less than that to the Wakhjir Pass (Afghanistan–China border) in the east. The Chaqmaqtin Lake is approximately 20 km (12 mi) to the northeast of Bozai Gumbad. Foreigners are requiresd to have an Afghan visa to tour the area.

== History ==
Bozai Gumbad was historically used as one of the trade routes between Kabul and Kashgar. The region was last conquered by Nader Shah and his army in around 1738. It has been under the control of Afghanistan since the formation of the Durrani Empire in 1747. The eastern border of Wakhan District was settled with China's Qing dynasty during the reign of Ahmad Shah Durrani. In 1891, during the Russian conquest of Central Asia, government forces from the Russian Empire had occupied Wakhan by stationing troops in Bozai Gumbad. A British national by the name of Francis Younghusband, who was traveling from Kashgar back to British India, was detained by the stationed Russian troops for having no visa or permission letter. After the signing of the 1893 Durand Line Agreement and the 1895 Pamir Boundary Commission protocols, the Russian forces withdrew from Bozai Gumbad and the Wakhan District of Afghanistan has since then became a buffer zone between Tsarist Russia and British India. There is no evidence to indicate that the local Pamir Mountains had ever earlier supported permanent settlements. While debris of mud buildings and similar constructions can occasionally be found, they are generally seen as only indicating relatively recent occupation and have little if any evidence of a permanent character. The shrines and tombs scattered throughout the area are all of a comparatively recent character. There are also the remains of a small fort found near this location. It is said to have been built by Bozai, a Kyrgyz chief.

== Climate ==
Bozai Gumbad is at extreme altitude, experiencing an alpine tundra climate (Köppen: ET), bordering on a subarctic climate (Dfc) that close to a monsoon-influenced subarctic climate (Dwc). The average annual temperature is −5.7 °C (21.7 °F) resulting in long, very cold winters and brief, cool summers.

Climate data for Bazai Gumbad (2009-present)
Month	Jan	Feb	Mar	Apr	May	Jun	Jul	Aug	Sep	Oct	Nov	Dec	Year
Record high °C (°F)	−4 (25)	0 (32)	5 (41)	10 (50)	13 (55)	19 (66)	24 (75)	21 (70)	17 (63)	14 (57)	3 (37)	−2 (28)	24 (75)
Mean daily maximum °C (°F)	−13.1 (8.4)	−9.9 (14.2)	−4.4 (24.1)	0.2 (32.4)	4.3 (39.7)	8.4 (47.1)	13.3 (55.9)	12.1 (53.8)	9.0 (48.2)	1.0 (33.8)	−6.1 (21.0)	−11.4 (11.5)	0.3 (32.5)
Daily mean °C (°F)	−21.2 (−6.2)	−18.1 (−0.6)	−12.6 (9.3)	−6.9 (19.6)	−1.0 (30.2)	4.2 (39.6)	9.3 (48.7)	8.4 (47.1)	4.8 (40.6)	−3.7 (25.3)	−13.3 (8.1)	−18.8 (−1.8)	−5.7 (21.7)
Mean daily minimum °C (°F)	−29.0 (−20.2)	−26.2 (−15.2)	−20.7 (−5.3)	−13.9 (7.0)	−6.3 (20.7)	0.0 (32.0)	5.2 (41.4)	4.7 (40.5)	0.6 (33.1)	−8.3 (17.1)	−20.4 (−4.7)	−26.1 (−15.0)	−11.7 (11.0)
Record low °C (°F)	−46 (−51)	−40 (−40)	−38 (−36)	−37 (−35)	−23 (−9)	−15 (5)	−8 (18)	−6 (21)	−11 (12)	−26 (−15)	−33 (−27)	−44 (−47)	−46 (−51)
Average precipitation mm (inches)	16.3 (0.64)	35.6 (1.40)	53.0 (2.09)	62.9 (2.48)	57.9 (2.28)	63.9 (2.52)	84.1 (3.31)	99.3 (3.91)	91.8 (3.61)	36.8 (1.45)	16.6 (0.65)	10.7 (0.42)	628.9 (24.76)
Average relative humidity (%)	78	79	77	73	63	56	51	55	50	56	71	74	65
Source: World Weather Online

== Economy ==
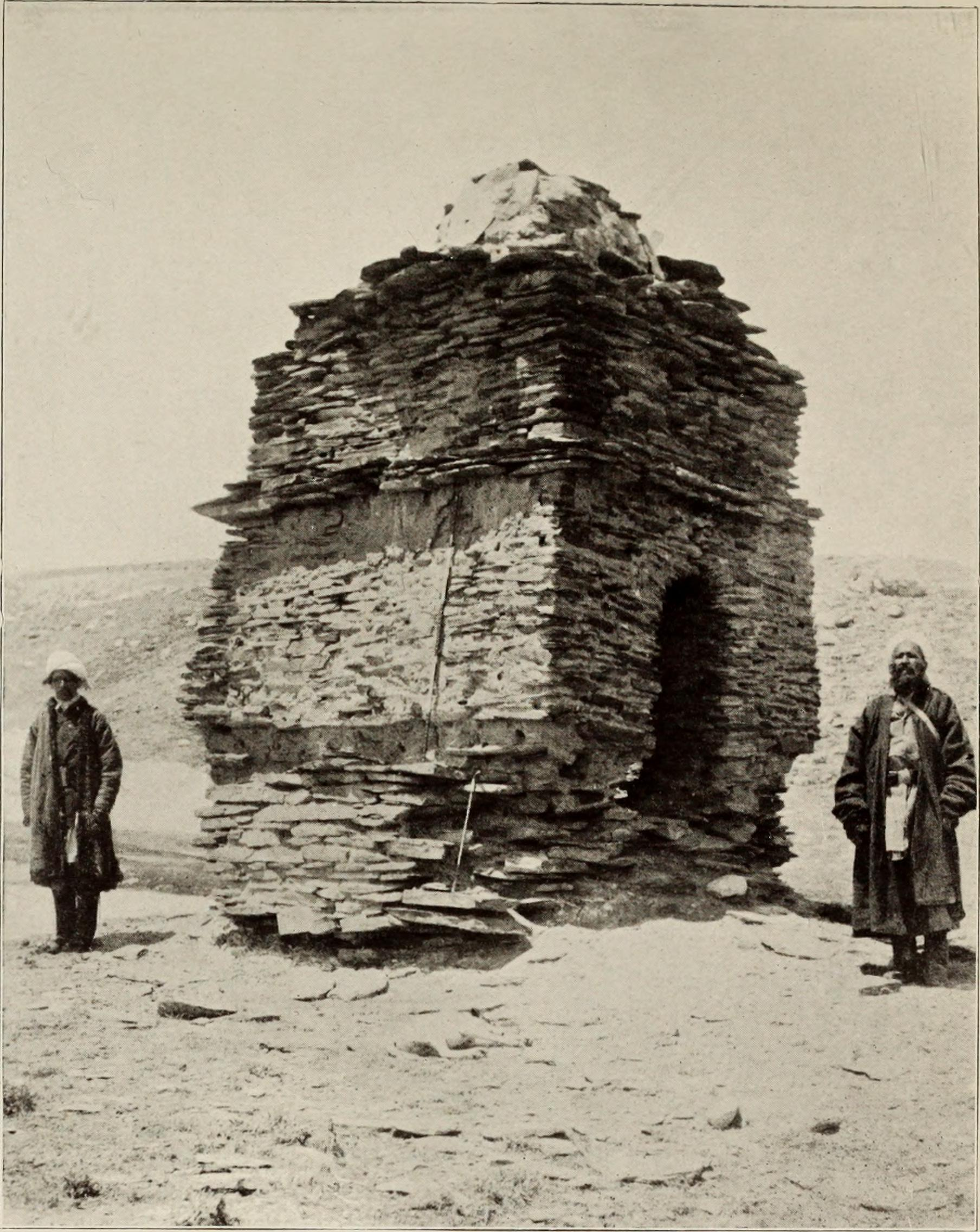
Ruin of Karwan-balasi near Bozai Gumbad, photographed by Aurel Stein in c. 1912

The economy of the area is based on agriculture, transport, trade, and tourism. In order to improve the local economy, the government of Afghanistan has rehabilitated and expanded the gravel road from Sarhad-e Broghil in the southwest to the Wakhjir Pass (Afghanistan–China border) in the east. One of the main attractions in Bozai Gumbad is the Chaqmaqtin Lake, which is a short distance to the northeast.
