= Chaqmaqtin Lake =

Lake in Afghanistan

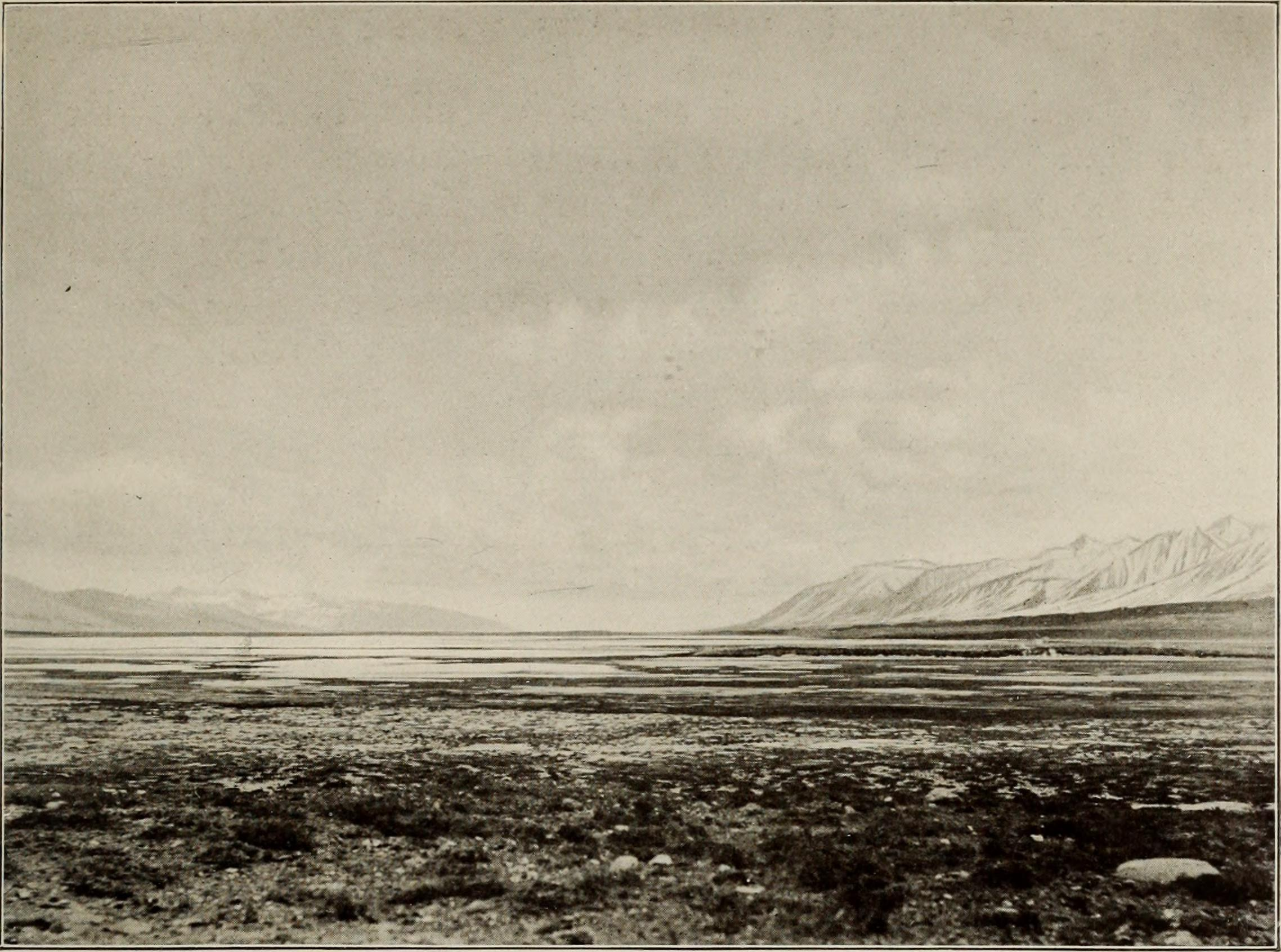
- View Across Lake Chakmaktin Towards Ak-Tash, Little Pamir (c. 1912)

- Location within Afghanistan
- Interactive map of Chaqmaqtin Lake
- Location: Wakhan National Park
- Coordinates: Afghanistan 37°14′0″N 74°11′0″E
- Primary outflows: Murghab River
- Basin countries: Afghanistan
- Max. length: 17 km (11 mi)
- Max. width: 3 km (1.9 mi)
- Surface elevation: 4,024 m (13,202 ft)

Chaqmaqtin Lake (Persian: كول چقمقتين, romanized: Kōl-e Chaqmaqtīn) is a lake in the Wakhan District of Badakhshan Province in northeastern Afghanistan. It lies at an elevation of about 4,024 m (13,202 ft) in the Little Pamir. It extends for about 17 km (11 mi) and is about 3 km (1.9 mi) wide. The lake is part of the Wakhan National Park and patrolled by the Afghan National Police and Afghan Armed Forces. Foreigners must have an Afghan visa to tour the area.

Lake Chaqmaqtin lies towards the western end of the Little Pamir valley. The Aksu or Murghab River flows east from the lake through the Little Pamir and enters into Gorno-Badakhshan, Tajikistan, at the eastern end of the valley. The Bazai River (also known as the Little Pamir River) rises a short distance west of the lake and flows 15km west to join the Wakhjir River and form the Wakhan River near Bazai Gumbad in the Wakhan District of Afghanistan. Some accounts state that the Bazai River also rises from Lake Chaqmaqtin. Another source calls the lake "a deeper and possibly marshy section within the Aq Su-Little Pamir River drainage divide".

Chaqmaqtin is a glacier basin lake formed when the ice was once very thick here before it melted away a few thousand years ago.

== See also ==
- List of dams and reservoirs in Afghanistan
- Tourism in Afghanistan
- Water supply in Afghanistan
