= Broghil Pass =

Mountain pass on the Afghanistan-Pakistan border

- کوتل بروغیل (Dari)
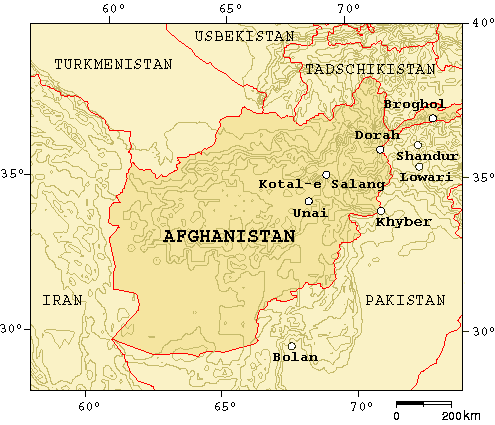
- Mountain passes of Afghanistan

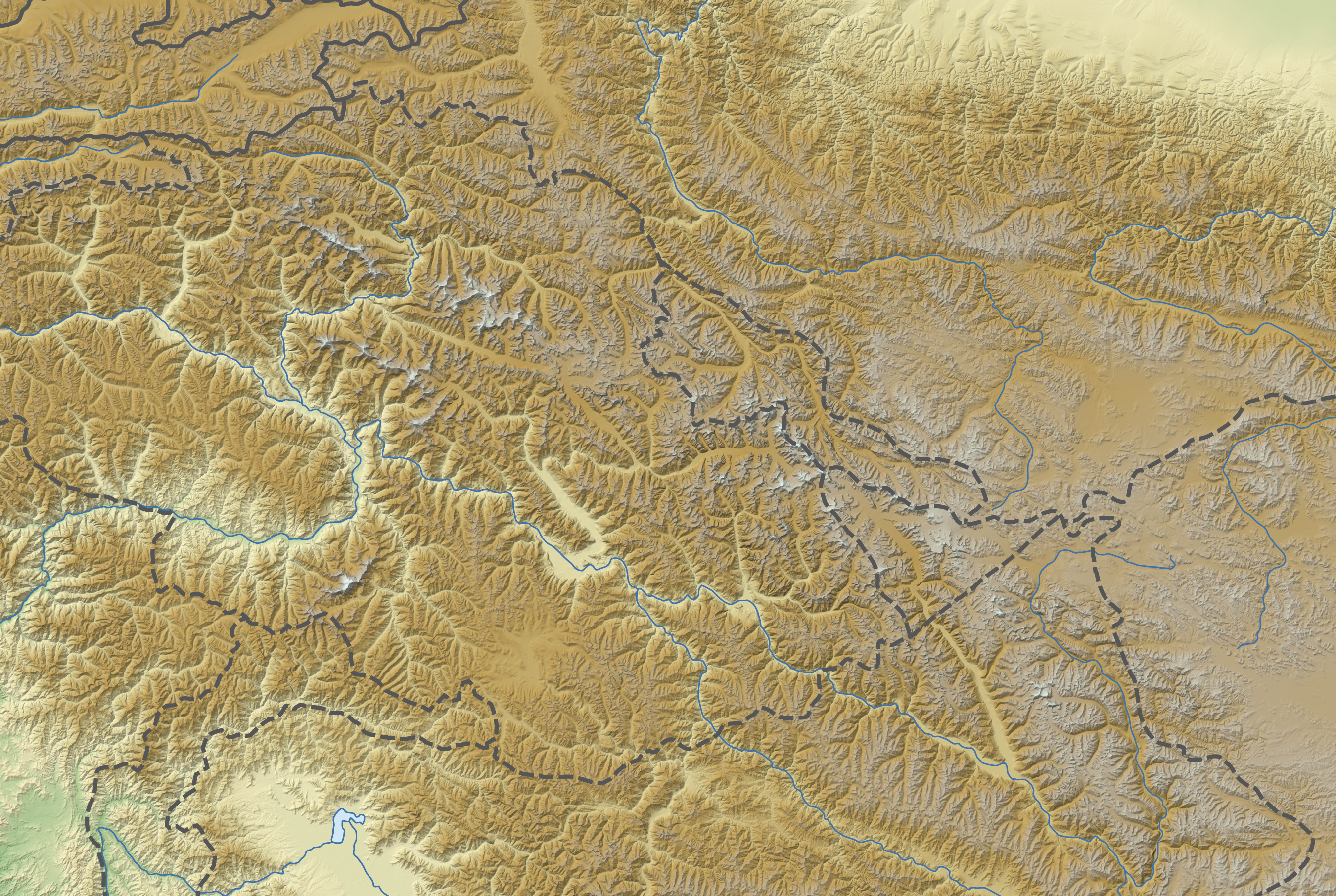
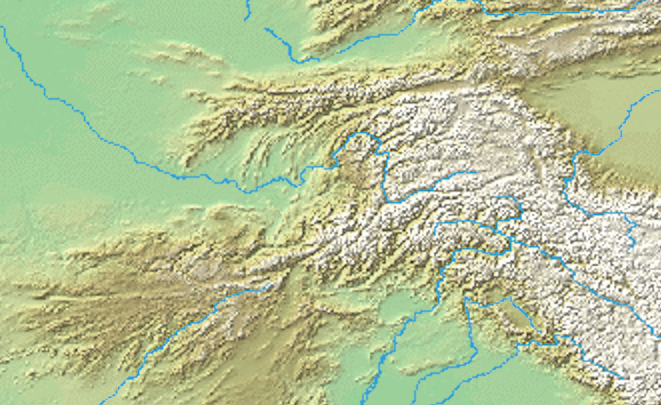
- Location within Karakoram Location within Afghanistan Location within Gilgit Baltistan Location within Pakistan Location within Pamir
- Interactive map of Broghil Pass
- Elevation: 3,798 m (12,461 ft)

Third Approach
- Location: Afghanistan-Pakistan border
- Range: Hindu Kush
- Coordinates: 36°53′01″N 73°21′01″E

Broghil Pass (Khowar: بروغل ان; Urdu: درۂ بروغل) is a high mountain pass crossing the Hindu Kush mountain range along the Pakistan–Afghanistan Border, connecting Upper Chitral District of Pakistan with Wakhan District of Afghanistan. It is at an elevation of 3,798 m (12,461 ft).

Sarhad Broghil is the nearest town in Afghanistan from the pass. The road is being improved as of early 2025.

== History ==
Although the ultimate etymology is uncertain, Broghil is suggested to have been derived from two Khowar words, baṛa (lit. high) and gol (lit. valley) or guṛ (lit. ravine), translating into high valley or ravine. A tributary of Wakhan River flows across Broghil, forming a narrow ravine. Broghil is a relatively low pass. It was closed for about three months each winter because of snow, but for much of the rest of the year it was passable even for cart traffic.

It is one of the four major mountain passes entering Chitral District; the others are the Dorah Pass from Badakshan Province of Afghanistan, Shandur Top from Gilgit, and Lowari Top from Upper Dir District.

== European migration ==
According to the National Geographic Genographic Project, Broghol Pass appears to be the route used by the ancestors of all modern Western Europeans to reach Europe. Modern Europeans carrying the M45 genetic marker crossed Broghol and then turned west; M45 further mutated to become M173 and then M343, which is carried by 70% of the population of England.

== In popular culture ==
- The 1985 comedy movie Spies Like Us depicts Dan Aykroyd crossing the Broghol Pass on a mountain yak.

== See also ==
- Broghil Valley National Park
