= Little Pamir =

Small U-shaped valley in northeastern Afghanistan

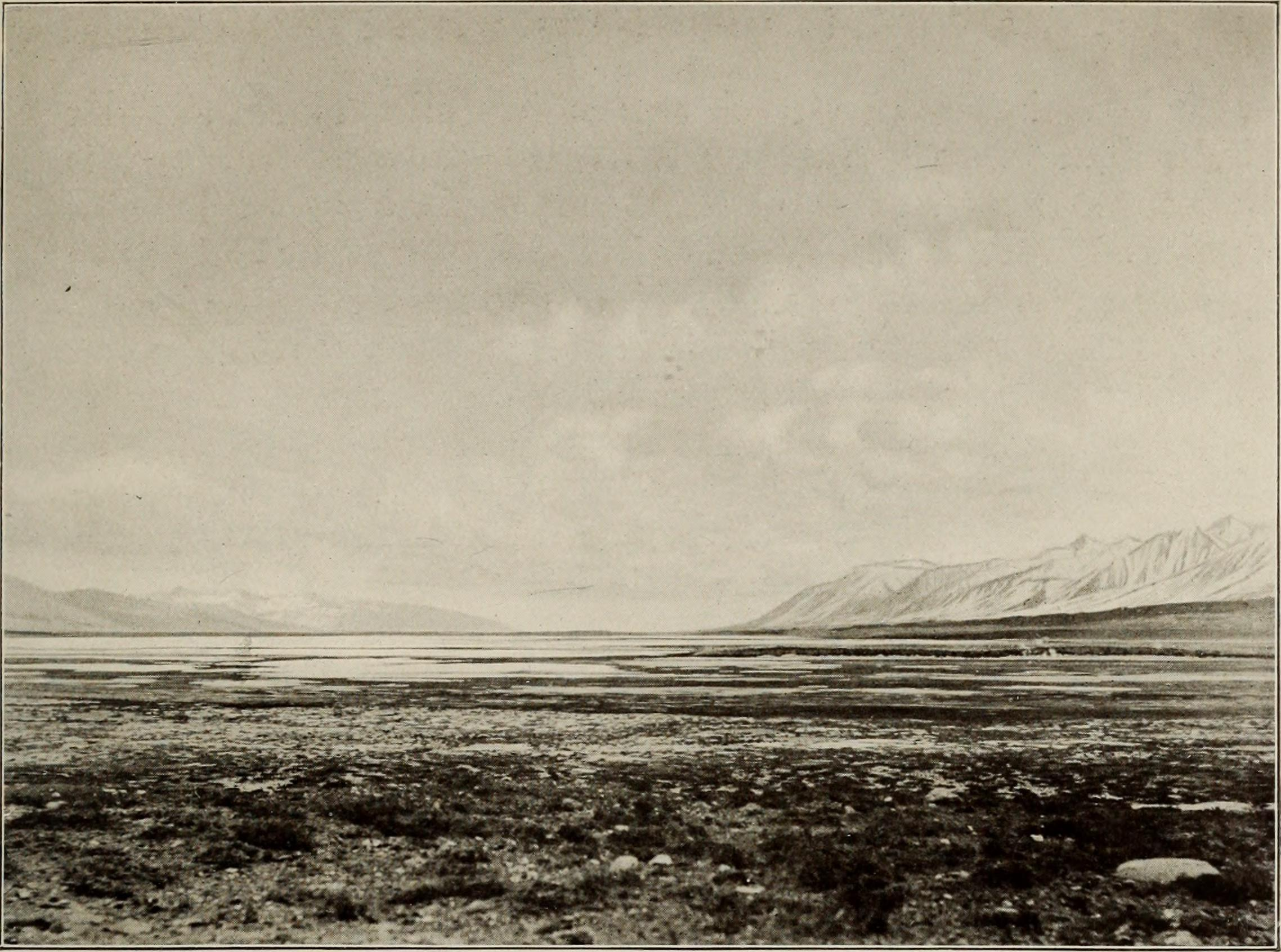
- View across Chaqmaqtin Lake towards Ak-Tash, Little Pamir (c. 1912)

- Location within Afghanistan

Geography
- Coordinates: 37°16′N 74°17′E
- Interactive map of Little Pamir

The Little Pamir (Dari: پامیر خرد, romanized: Pāmīr-e Khord; Kyrgyz: Kichik Pamir; Pashto: کوچنی پامیر, romanized: Kochni Pamir; Wakhi: Wuch Pamir) is a broad U-shaped grassy valley or pamir in the eastern part of the Wakhan National Park, which itself is located in the Wakhan District of Badakhshan Province in northeastern Afghanistan. The valley is 100 km (62 mi) long and 10 km (6.2 mi) wide, and is bounded to the north by the Nicholas Range, a subrange of the Pamir Mountains.

The Little Pamir is accessed by a gravel road at Sarhad, Afghanistan, about 5 days' walk away. A rough road also leads to the Little Pamir from Murghab in Tajikistan, and was the route by which the Soviets occupied the eastern part of Afghanistan's Wakhan District. The border is now closed. In 2000 the road was used to deliver humanitarian aid to the Kyrgyz of the Little Pamir, and in 2003 a trade fair was held at the border for a few hours.

Chaqmaqtin Lake (17 km (11 mi) by 3 km (1.9 mi)) lies towards the western end of the valley while the Tegermansu valley lies at its easternmost end. The Aksu or Murghab River flows east from the lake through the Little Pamir to enter Tajikistan at the eastern end of the valley. The Bazai River (also known as the Little Pamir River) rises a short distance west of the lake, and flows 15 km (9.3 mi) west to join the Wakhjir River and form the Wakhan River near the settlement of Bazai Gumbad.

== History ==
The Little Pamir was under the jurisdiction of the rulers of Qala-i-Panjah since ancient time, possibly since the time of the Greco-Bactrian Kingdom. It has been used by the Kyrgyz herders for summer pasture. After the 1978 Saur Revolution almost all the inhabitants migrated south to Pakistan. Many of the Kyrgyz subsequently migrated to Turkey, but in October 1979, before the Soviet occupation of Afghanistan, a group of about 200 of them returned to the Little Pamir. In 2003 there were 140 yurt households.

During the late-2000s, due to lawlessness, the Kyrgyz in Afghanistan reported robbery and theft in Little Pamir by bandits from Tajikistan. In the late-2010s, a joint Chinese-Tajik-Afghan border patrol base was reportedly set up across the border on the Tajikistan side that remained secretive for a few years. Their joint patrol in Little Pamir using Chinese vehicles were spotted as early as 2016. According to Afghanistan, all parts of Wakhan are patrolled by the Afghan National Police and Afghan Armed Forces. Foreigners are required to have an Afghan visa, including a special permission letter from Afghanistan's Ministry of Information and Culture.

== Wakhan National Park ==
Little Pamir is part of the Wakhan National Park, which supports populations of Marco Polo sheep, ibex, and other wild animals. The naturalist George Schaller has advocated the creation of an international peace park to protect the wildlife in the area.

== See also ==
- List of protected areas of Afghanistan
- Afghanistan–Tajikistan relations
- Afghanistan–China relations
