= Sarhad, Afghanistan =

Sarhad-e Broghil
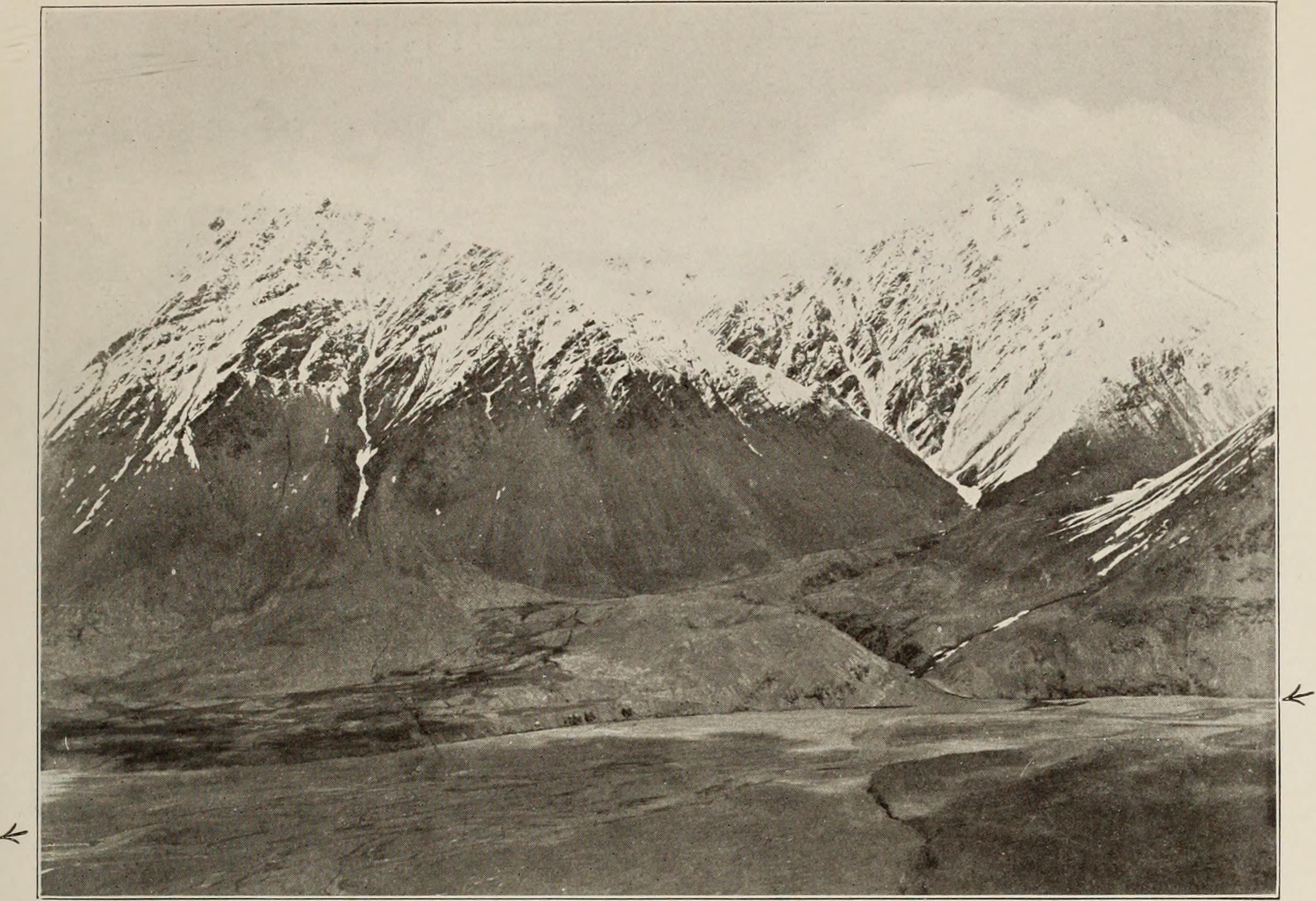
- Sarhad Valley in 1912 by Aurel Stein

- Location in Afghanistan
- Coordinates: 36°59′0″N 73°27′0″E
- Country: Afghanistan
- Province: Badakhshan
- District: Wakhan
- Elevation: 10,801 ft (3,292 m)
- Time zone: UTC+04:30 (Afghanistan Time)

Sarhad, also known as Sarhad-e Broghil or Sarhad-e Wakhan, is a river valley in the Wakhan District of Badakhshan Province of Afghanistan. The population of Sarhad was reported in 2003 at around 548 people. The valley is part of the Wakhan National Park and patrolled by the Afghan National Police and Afghan Armed Forces.

Sarhad lies at an altitude of 3,292 m (10,801 ft) on the Wakhan River, at a point where the river broadens into a wide plain. It is inhabited by the native Pamiris, Wakhis and Kyrgyz people of Afghanistan. As part of the Silk Road, the land has been used throughout history as one of the trade routes between Kabul and Kashgar.

Sarhad is connected by a gravel road to Gazkhan in the west and Bozai Gumbad in the northeast. There is also an unpaved road leading to the Broghil Pass in the southwest. Rehabilitation of the road from Gazkhan to Bozai Gumbad and then to the Wakhjir Pass (Afghanistan–China border) in the northeast has started in 2025. As of October 2026, the road project has been completed.

== Climate ==
Sarhadd has a tundra climate (Köppen: ET) with brief, cool summers and long, bitterly cold winters.

Climate data for Sarhadd
Month	Jan	Feb	Mar	Apr	May	Jun	Jul	Aug	Sep	Oct	Nov	Dec	Year
Daily mean °C (°F)	−19 (−2)	−17.2 (1.0)	−12.2 (10.0)	−6.0 (21.2)	−1.4 (29.5)	2.7 (36.9)	6.1 (43.0)	5.5 (41.9)	1.3 (34.3)	−4.9 (23.2)	−11.3 (11.7)	−16.4 (2.5)	−6.1 (21.1)
Average precipitation mm (inches)	55.0 (2.17)	78.8 (3.10)	85.5 (3.37)	78.7 (3.10)	52.7 (2.07)	27.0 (1.06)	23.5 (0.93)	24.8 (0.98)	18.7 (0.74)	35.2 (1.39)	51.6 (2.03)	43.7 (1.72)	575.2 (22.66)
Average relative humidity (%)	87	87	86	84	74	59	42	37	37	55	78	84	68
Source 1: ClimateCharts
Source 2: World Weather Online (humidity)

== Economy ==
The people of Sarhad are villagers involved in agriculture, transport, trade, and tourism. Some go to work in Kabul or other Afghan cities.

== See also ==
- Tourism in Afghanistan
- Valleys of Afghanistan
