= Alexander Duncan (footballer) =

Scottish footballer

Personal information
- Date of birth: 1891
- Place of birth: Glasgow, Scotland
- Height: 5 ft 8 in (1.73 m)
- Position: Winger

Senior career*
Years	Team	Apps	(Gls)
1910–1911	Cambuslang		
1911–1913	Portsmouth		
1913	Grimsby Town	2	(0)
- * Club domestic league appearances and goals

Alexander L. Duncan (1891 – after 1912) was a Scottish professional footballer who played as a winger.
