= Wakhan River =

Coordinates: 37°01′N 72°39′E

Wakhan River Ab-i-Wakhan
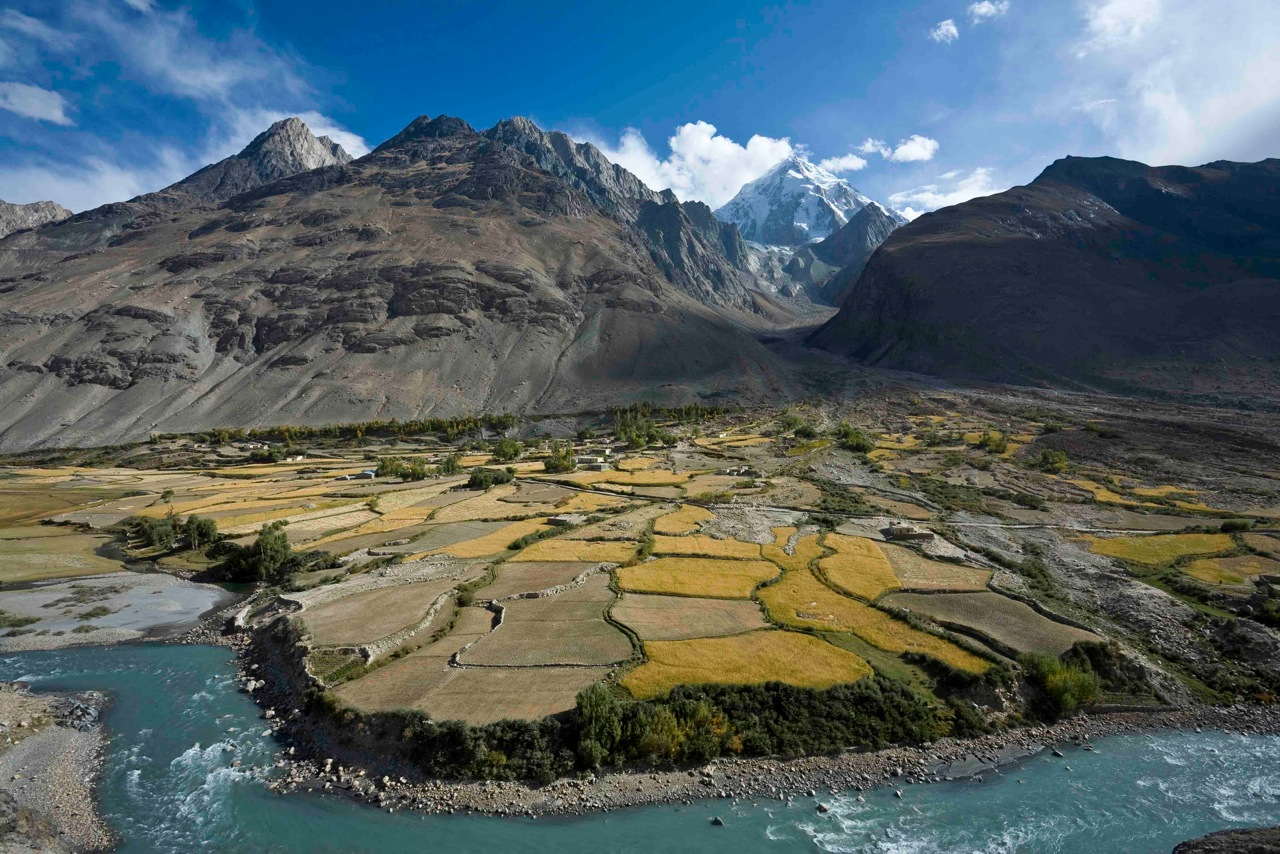
- Native name: واخان سیند (Pashto)

Location
- Country: Wakhan District, Afghanistan

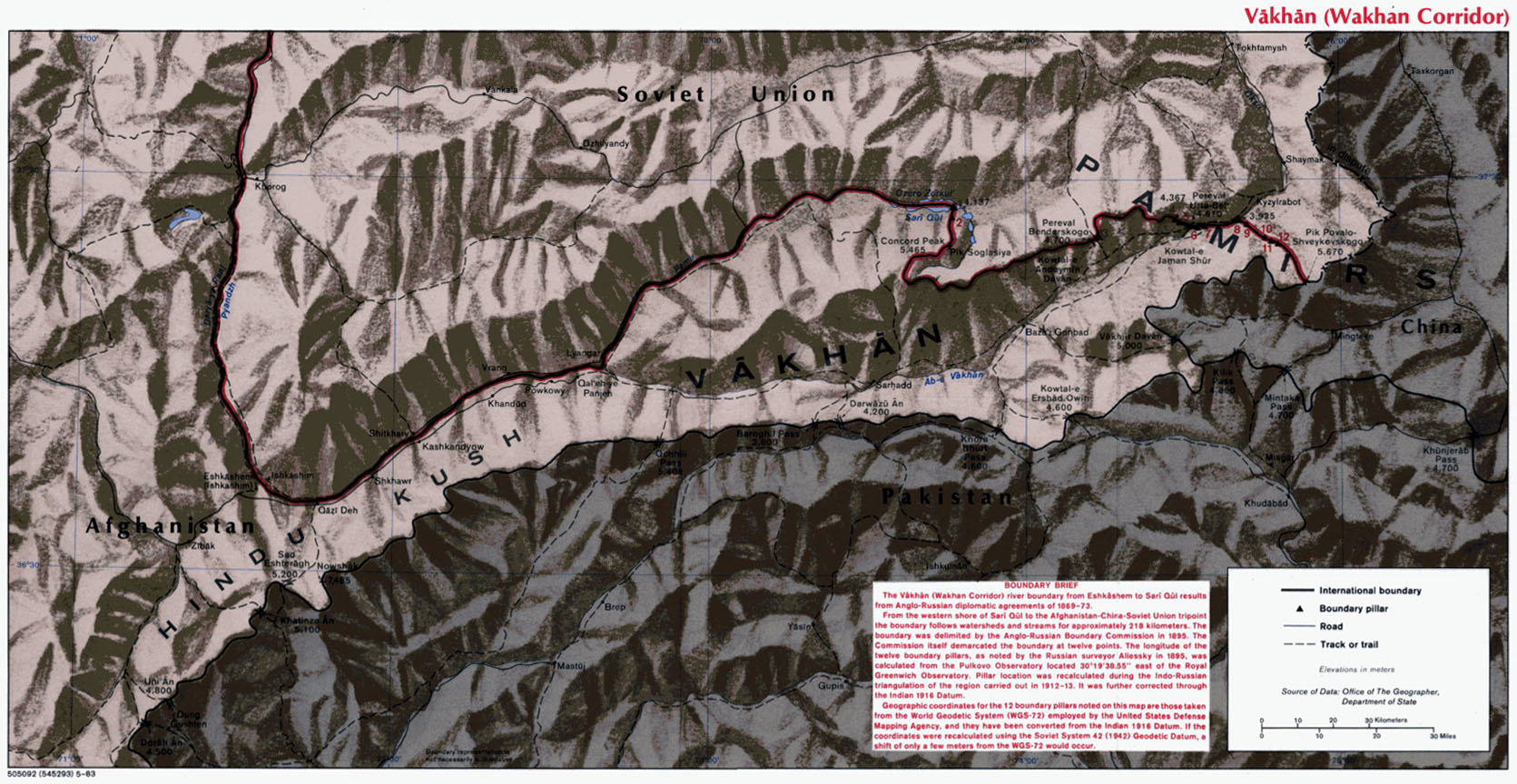
Map of Wakhan Corridor, including Wakhan River, or Ab-i-Wakhan

Wakhan River (Dari: آب واخان Āb-i-Wākhān; Pashto: واخان سیند Wākhān Sīnd; Tajik: واخاندريا Vaxondaryo) is a river in the Wakhan District of Afghanistan. Specifically, it is the name of the Sarhad branch of the Panj River along its upper length in the Wakhan District of Badakhshan Province.

The river rises in Afghanistan's Hindu Kush mountains. It is formed by the confluence of the Wakhjir River and the Bazai River near Kashch Goz and Bazai Gumbad, some 40 km (25 mi) west of the Wakhjir Pass (Afghanistan–China border). Shortly thereafter, the Little Pamir comes to an end, and the conjoined river contracts into a narrow, deep, rapid river, delimited by cliffs and steep hills. From here the banks have grown birch and juniper trees. 40 km (25 mi) west at Sarhad the river flows in a dramatic basin 3 km (1.9 mi) wide. Little if any vegetation, except dwarf willow, grows in the area.

At Sarhad the river contracts into a wider valley, which is more populated. The river emerges near the village of Qala-i-Panjah, where it is joined by the Pamir River. From that point the river is locally spoken of as the Panj River.

== See also ==
- List of rivers of Afghanistan
