= Wakhjir Pass =

Mountain pass in Afghanistan and China

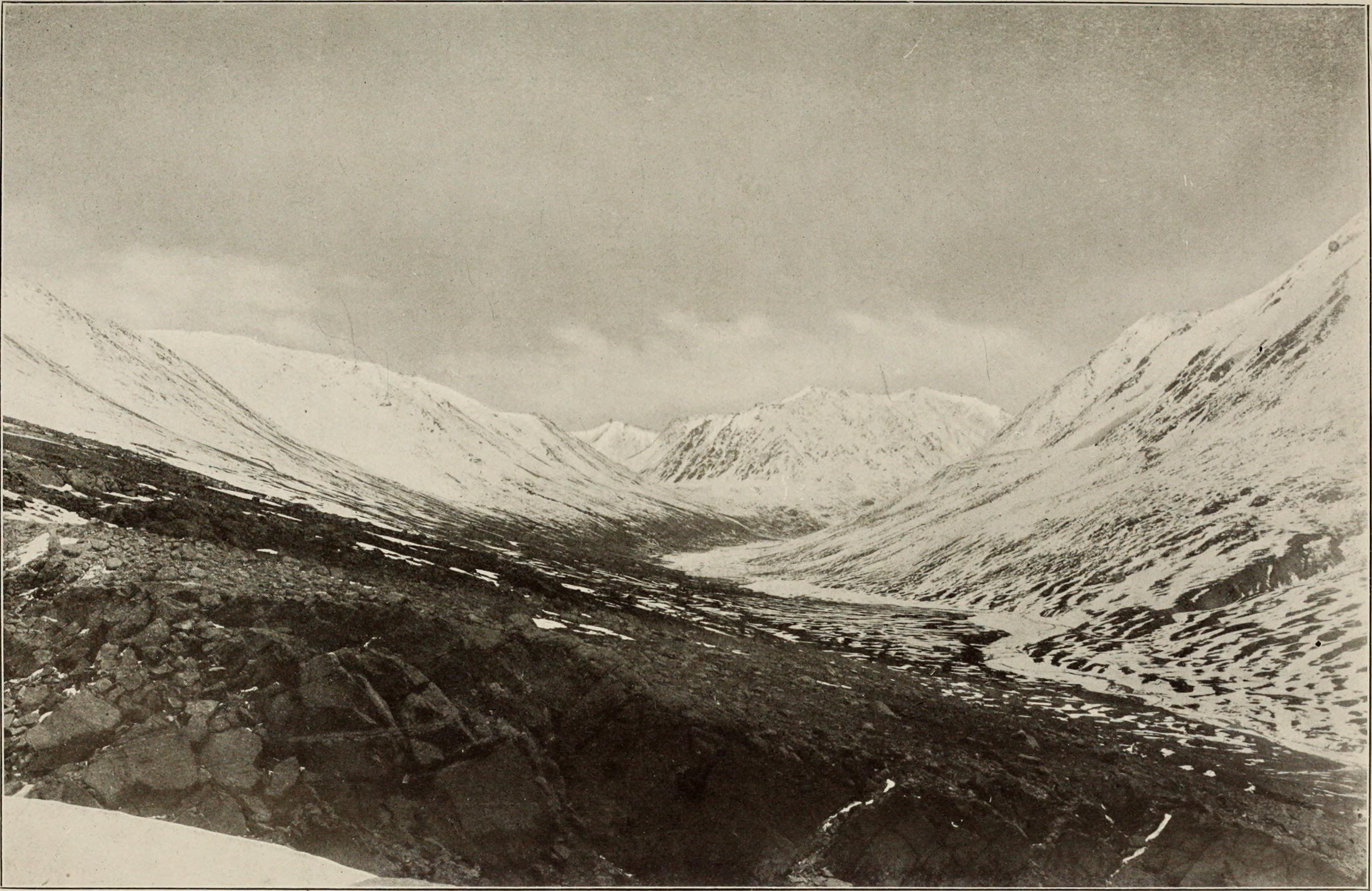
- Photo of the valley before the pass by Aurel Stein

- Location within Southern Xinjiang
- Interactive map of Wakhjir Pass
- Elevation: 4,923 m (16,152 ft)

Location
- Location: Wakhan, Badakhshan, Afghanistan - Taxkorgan, Kashgar, Xinjiang, China
- Range: Pamir Mountains
- Coordinates: 37.0872°N 74.4842°E

Wakhjir Pass

Chinese name
- Traditional Chinese: 瓦根基達坂
- Simplified Chinese: 瓦根基达坂
Transcriptions
Standard Mandarin
- Hanyu Pinyin: Wǎgēnjī Dábǎn
- Wade–Giles: Wa³-kên¹-chi¹ Ta²-pan³
Yue: Cantonese
- Jyutping: Ngaa^{5}-gan^{1}-gei^{1} Daat^{9} baan^{2}

Alternative Chinese name
- Traditional Chinese: 瓦赫吉爾山口
- Simplified Chinese: 瓦赫吉尔山口
Transcriptions
Standard Mandarin
- Hanyu Pinyin: Wǎhèjí'ěr Shānkǒu
- Wade–Giles: wa^{3}-ho^{4}-chi^{2}-erh^{3} shan^{1}-K'ou^{3}
Yue: Cantonese
- Jyutping: Ngaa^{5}-haak^{8}-gat^{7}-yi^{5} Saan^{1}-hau^{2}

Uyghur name
- Uyghur: ۋاخجىر داۋانى

Pashto name
- Pashto: واخجیر دالان Vākhjīr Daalaan

The Wakhjir Pass (Pashto: واخجیر دالان Vakhjir Daalaan), also referred to as Zero Point, is a mountain pass at the eastern end of the Wakhan Corridor near the Afghanistan–China border, between the Hindu Kush and Pamir Mountains. It is the only potentially navigable pass between Afghanistan and China in the modern era. It links Wakhan District of Badakhshan Province in Afghanistan with Tashkurgan Tajik Autonomous County in Xinjiang, China, at an altitude of 4,923 m (16,152 ft). As of 2026, the pass has no official border crossing point. With a difference of 3.5 hours, the Afghanistan–China border has the sharpest official change of clocks of any international frontier (UTC+04:30 in Afghanistan to UTC+08:00, in China). China refers to the pass as South Wakhjir Pass (Chinese: 南瓦根基达坂), as there is a northern pass on the Chinese side.

== Overview ==
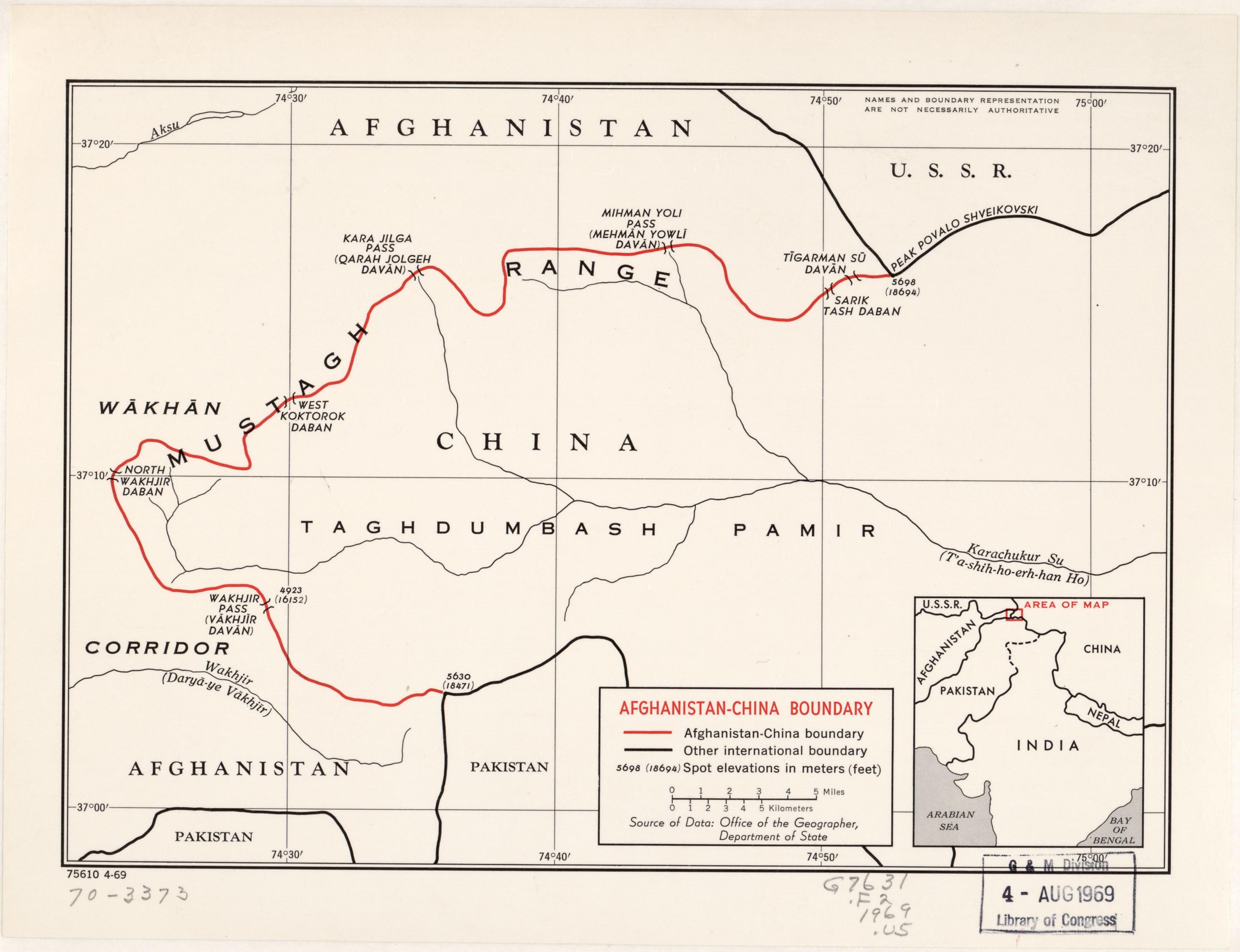
Map of Afghanistan-China Boundary including Wakhjir Pass (labeled as WAKHJIR PASS (VĀKHJĪR DAVĀN) 4923 (16152)) (1969) (Note: From map: "Names and boundary representation are not necessarily authoritative")

As of 2026, there is no official border crossing between China and Afghanistan. On the Chinese side, the immediate region is only accessible to security personnel. A 92 km-long (57 mi) barbed wire fence was erected on the border, and there is a Chinese border guard outpost at Keketuluke just 20 km (12 mi) east of the pass. In the summer of 2009, the Chinese Ministry of National Defense began construction of a new road near the Wakhjir Pass for use by border guards. The road leads through Taghdumbash Pamir to China National Highway 314 about 80 km (50 mi) away. The valley to the east of Wakhjir Pass on the Chinese side is the Chalachigu Valley. It is entirely closed to visitors; however, local residents and herders from the area are permitted access. The Chinese refer to it as the portion of Wakhan Corridor in China.

On the Afghan side, the nearest major settlement is Sarhad-e Broghil, about 121 km (75 mi) of road travel from the pass. Just below the pass on the Afghan side is an ice cave, at an altitude of 4,554 m (14,941 ft). This is the source of the Wakhjir River, which ultimately flows to the Amu Darya (Oxus). The cave is therefore claimed as a source of the Amu Darya. Dilisang Pass, to Pakistan, is in the same valley about 20 km (12 mi) away.

Initial work on the road from Sarhad to Bozai Gumbad and then to the Wakhjir Pass has started in late 2023. By July 2024, construction on the gravel road was partially completed and reached the Wakhjir Pass.

== History ==
Traditionally, the pass is inaccessible for at least five months out of the year and is accessible irregularly for the remainder of the year. The terrain is extremely difficult, although Aurel Stein reported that the immediate approaches to the pass were "remarkably easy". Although the natives constantly crossed it throughout history, there are few records of successful crossings by foreigners.

Historically, the pass was part of the Silk Road and used as a trading route between Kabul and Kashgar. It is believed that the Chinese Buddhist pilgrim Xuanzang traveled via this pass in approximately 649 AD, when it was part of Bactria and Islam has not reached the area. Marco Polo purportedly crossed the pass when he traveled through the Pamirs, although he did not mention the pass by name. The Jesuit priest Benedict Goëz crossed from the Wakhan to China between 1602 and 1606. The next oldest accounts are from the period of the Great Game in the late 19th century. In 1868, a pundit known as the Mirza, working for the Great Trigonometric Survey of British-India, crossed the pass. There were further crossings in 1874 by Captain T.E. Gordon of the British Army, in 1891 by Francis Younghusband, and in 1894 by Lord Curzon. When Stein crossed the pass in May 1906, he reported that the pass was used by around 100 pony loads of goods each way annually. Since then, the only Westerner to have crossed the pass seems to have been H.W. Tilman in 1947.

The region around the Wakhjir Pass was historically claimed by Afghanistan and China. The frontier boundary between the two empires was established in 1895 after an agreement was signed between the British and the Russians, although the Afghans and Chinese did not finally agree on the border until 1963.

Since 2009, officials of the Islamic Republic of Afghanistan has asked China on several occasions to open the border at the Wakhjir Pass for economic reasons. However, China has resisted, largely due to unrest in its far western province of Xinjiang, which borders the corridor. It is believed that the United States in the same period had also asked China to open the border.

== Climate ==
Wakhjir Pass has a tundra climate (Köppen: ET) with an ice cap climate (EF) characteristics, With cold to frigid weather year-round. The warmest months of July and August are slightly above freezing. The area lies in continuous permafrost zone as the mean annual temperature is −11.7 °C (10.9 °F).

Climate data for Wakhjir Pass
| Month | Jan | Feb | Mar | Apr | May | Jun | Jul | Aug | Sep | Oct | Nov | Dec | Year |
|---|---|---|---|---|---|---|---|---|---|---|---|---|---|
| Daily mean °C (°F) | −26.8 (−16.2) | −24.6 (−12.3) | −18.8 (−1.8) | −10.9 (12.4) | −6.1 (21.0) | −1.8 (28.8) | 1.1 (34.0) | 0.2 (32.4) | −4.5 (23.9) | −10.5 (13.1) | −15.7 (3.7) | −21.4 (−6.5) | −11.6 (11.0) |
| Average precipitation mm (inches) | 8.5 (0.33) | 12.5 (0.49) | 13.5 (0.53) | 31.3 (1.23) | 19.6 (0.77) | 20.6 (0.81) | 15.4 (0.61) | 18.5 (0.73) | 10.7 (0.42) | 7.9 (0.31) | 9.8 (0.39) | 6.9 (0.27) | 175.2 (6.89) |
Source: ClimateCharts

== See also ==
- Tourism in Afghanistan
- Tegermansu Pass
- Beyik Pass
- Kilik Pass
- Mintaka Pass
