= Alexander Duncan (doctor) =

Alexander Duncan is a British General practitioner who spent six years in a village high up in the Wakhan Corridor of north-eastern Afghanistan. In December 2007 Alastair Leithead on BBC News 24 presented a half-hour feature about the corridor, focusing particularly on the work of expatriate Duncan, which provided a significant piece of extended media reporting from this inaccessible area.

In January 2010 Duncan and his wife Eleanor were both awarded the MBE for their work in Afghanistan. He was educated at Dulwich College and Corpus Christi College, Cambridge. He now lives in England with his four children and wife.
