= Afghanistan–China border =

Sino-Afghan territorial border

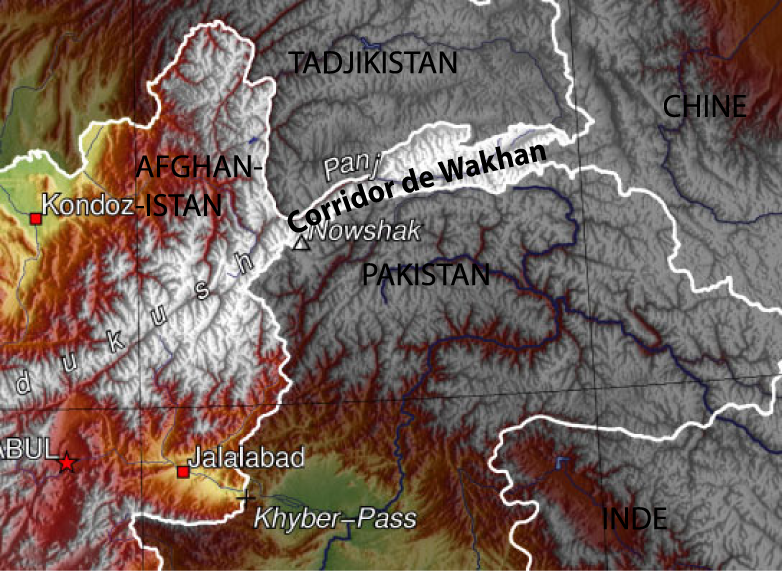
Map including the Afghanistan–China border

Afghanistan and China share a 92-kilometre-long (57 mi) border, beginning at the tripoint with Pakistan, following the watershed along the Mustagh Range, and ending at Tajikistan. This short border is in the far northeast of Afghanistan, distant from much of the country or urban areas in either country, at the end of the long, narrow Wakhan Corridor. The Chinese side of the border is in the Chalachigu Valley. The border is crossed by several mountain passes, including Wakhjir Pass in the south and Tegermansu Pass in the north.

Both sides of the border are protected areas: Wakhan National Park in Wakhan District, Badakhshan Province on the Afghan side and Taxkorgan Nature Reserve in Taxkorgan Tajik Autonomous County, Kashgar Prefecture, Xinjiang Uygur Autonomous Region on the Chinese side.

The border marks the greatest terrestrial time zone difference on Earth, with a 3.5 hour difference between Afghanistan's UTC+04:30 and China's UTC+08:00.

== History ==
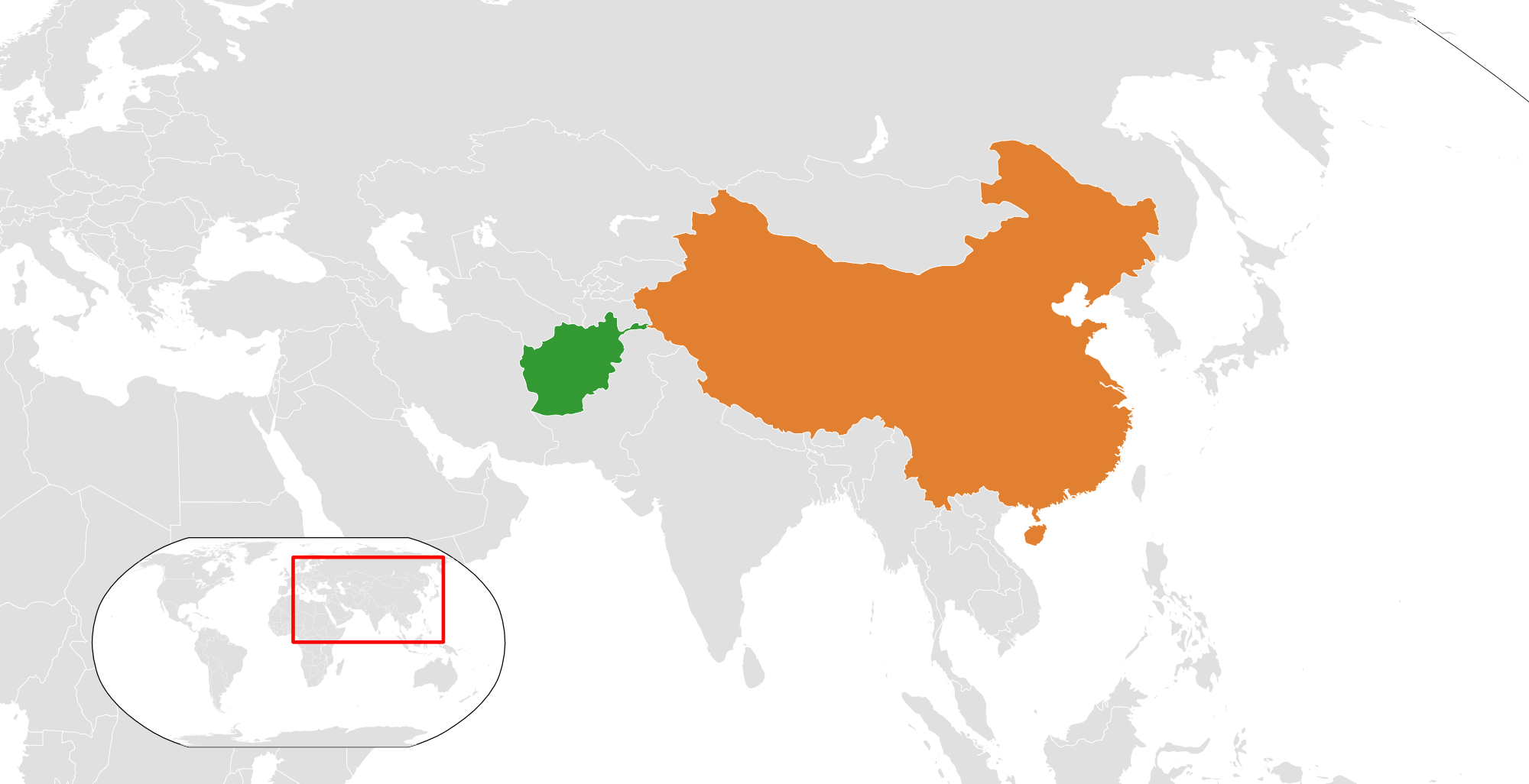
Afghanistan (green) and China (orange)

The border area was a thoroughfare on the Silk Road. It is believed that the famous Chinese Buddhist pilgrim Xuanzang traveled this pass on his return trip back to China around 649 AD.

The border was established between Afghanistan and China in an agreement between the British and Russian empires in 1895 as part of the Great Game, although the Chinese and Afghans did not finally agree on the border until 1963. The Kingdom of Afghanistan and the People's Republic of China demarcated their border in 1963.

It is believed that in more recent times, the main pass, Wakhjir Pass, is sometimes used as a low intensity drug smuggling route, to transport opium made in Afghanistan to China. In the 2000s, Afghanistan asked China on several occasions to open the border in the Wakhan Corridor for economic reasons or as an alternative supply route for fighting the Taliban insurgency. However, China resisted, largely due to unrest in its far western province of Xinjiang, which borders the corridor. In December 2009, it was reported that the United States had asked China to open the corridor.

There have been proposals and plans by Kashgar regional government to open Tegermansu Pass as a port of entry for economic purposes since the 1990s. However, this has yet to happen. By 2025, the Chinese military had set up a high green fence along the border, and before then, multiple large barracks.

== Geography ==
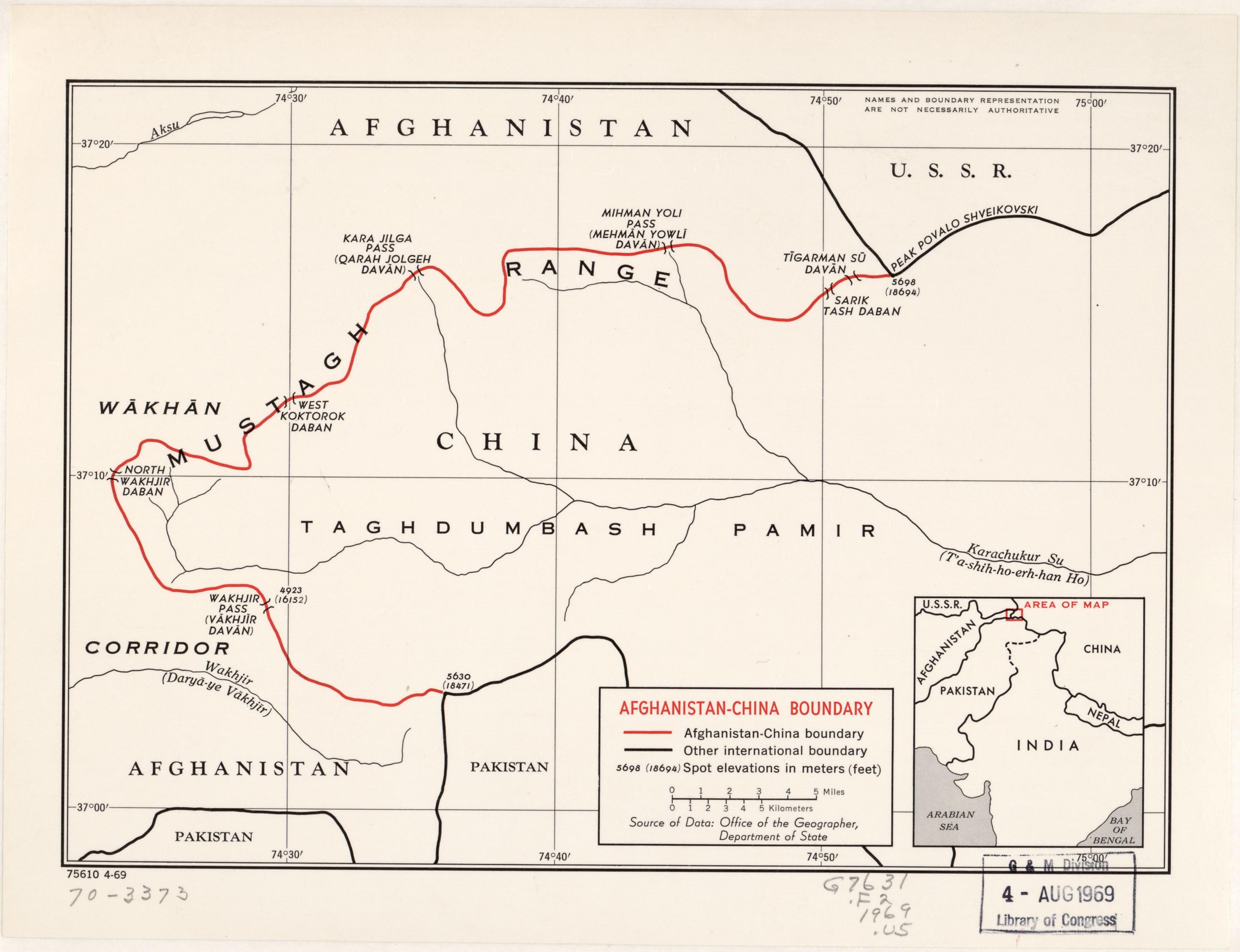
Afghanistan-China Boundary (1969), (Note: From map: "NAMES AND BOUNDARY REPRESENTATION ARE NOT NECESSARILY AUTHORITATIVE") includes most of the features mentioned in the 1963 treaty

Article 1 of the Boundary Treaty of 1963 describes the Afghanistan–China border, starting from the southern end:

starting from a peak with a height of 5,630 meters--the reference coordinates of which are approximately 37 degrees 03 minutes north, 74 degrees 36 minutes east in the southern extremity, the boundary line between the two countries runs along the Mustagh Range watershed between the Karachukur Su River, a tributary of the Tashkurghan River, on the one hand, and the sources of the Aksu River and the Wakhjir River, the upper reaches of the Wakhan River, on the other hand, passing through South Wakhjir Daban (Called Wakhjir Pass on the Afghan map) at the elevation of 4,923 meters, North Wakhjir Daban (named on the Chinese map only), West Koktorok Daban (named on the Chinese map only), East Koktorok Daban (called Kara Jilga Pass on the Afghan Map), Tok Man Su Daban (called Mihman Yoli Pass on the Afghan map), Sirik Tash Daban (named on the Chinese map only), Kokrash Kol Daban (called Tigarman Su Pass on the Afghan map) and reaches Peak Kokrash Kol (called Peak Povalo Shveikovski on the Afghan map) with a height of 5,698 meters.

The border's northern terminus is found at the Afghanistan-China-Tajikistan tripoint on Povalo-Shveikovskogo Peak (Chinese: 波万洛什维科夫斯基峰; pinyin: Bōwànluò Shíwéikēfūsījī Fēng) / Kokrash Kol Peak (Kekelaqukaole Peak; Chinese: 克克拉去考勒峰; pinyin: Kèkèlāqùkǎolè Fēng), the easternmost point of Afghanistan.

== Border crossings ==
Historically, the main crossing between the two sides was Wakhjir Pass. Wakhjir Pass has been in use for at least a millennium since the Silk Road. In addition to Wakhjir Pass, there is also Tegermansu Pass which is located on the far eastern end from Little Pamir.

The passes are closed as Chalachigu Valley, the valley on the Chinese side, is closed to visitors; however, local residents and herders from the area are permitted to access.

== Historical maps and gallery ==
Historical English-language maps of the Afghanistan–China border, mid to late 20th century:

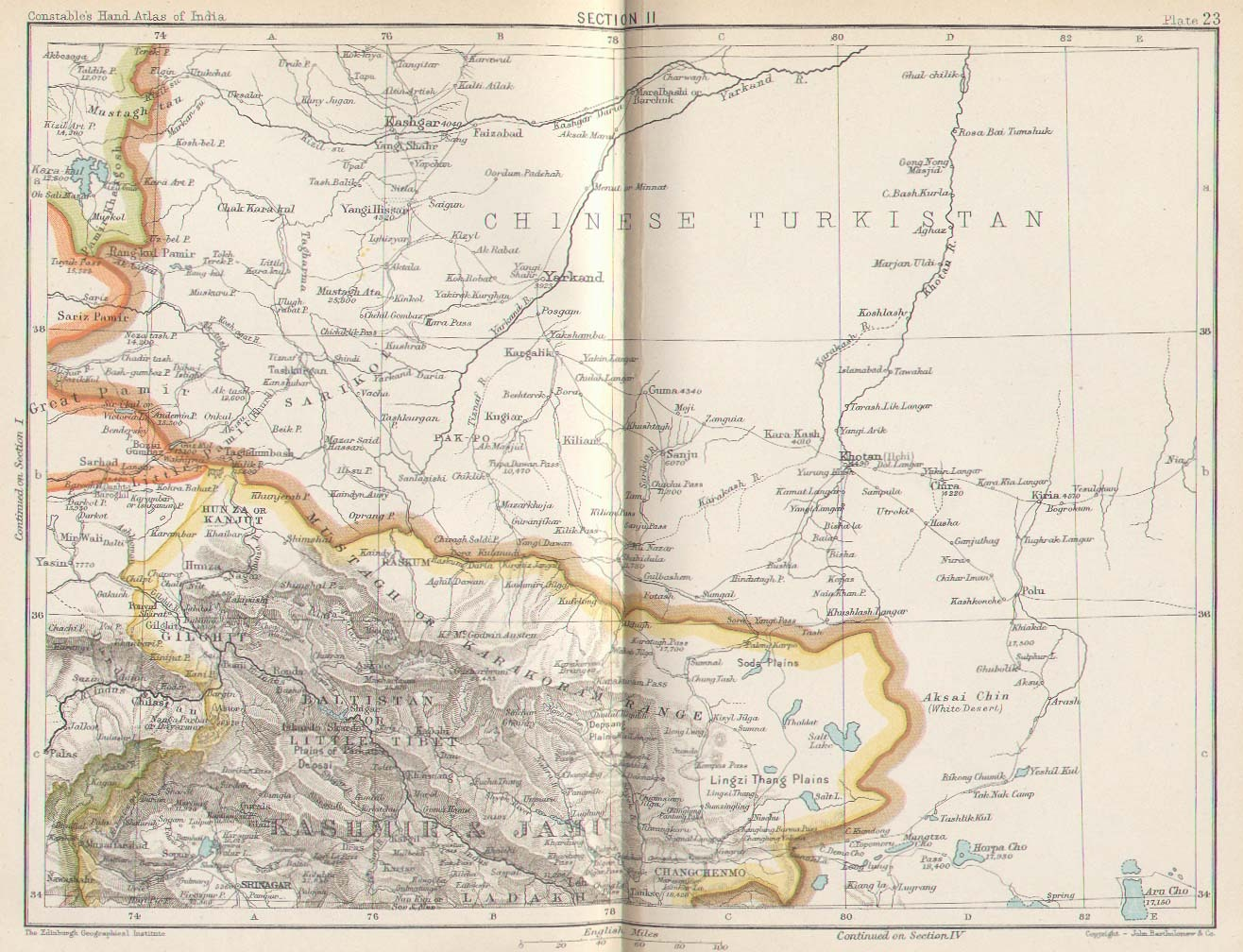
Map of the region (1893)

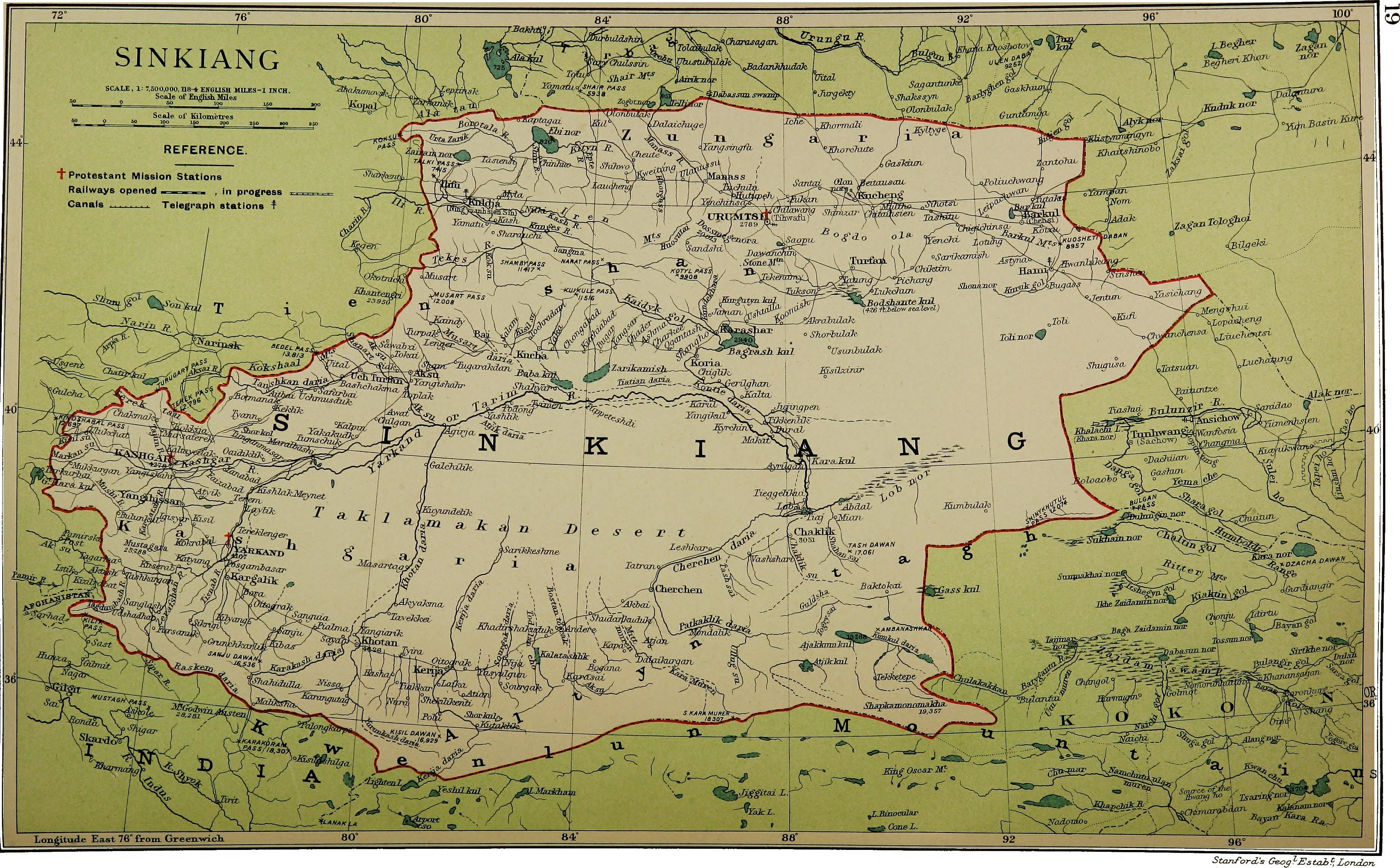
Map including the Afghanistan–China border (1917)

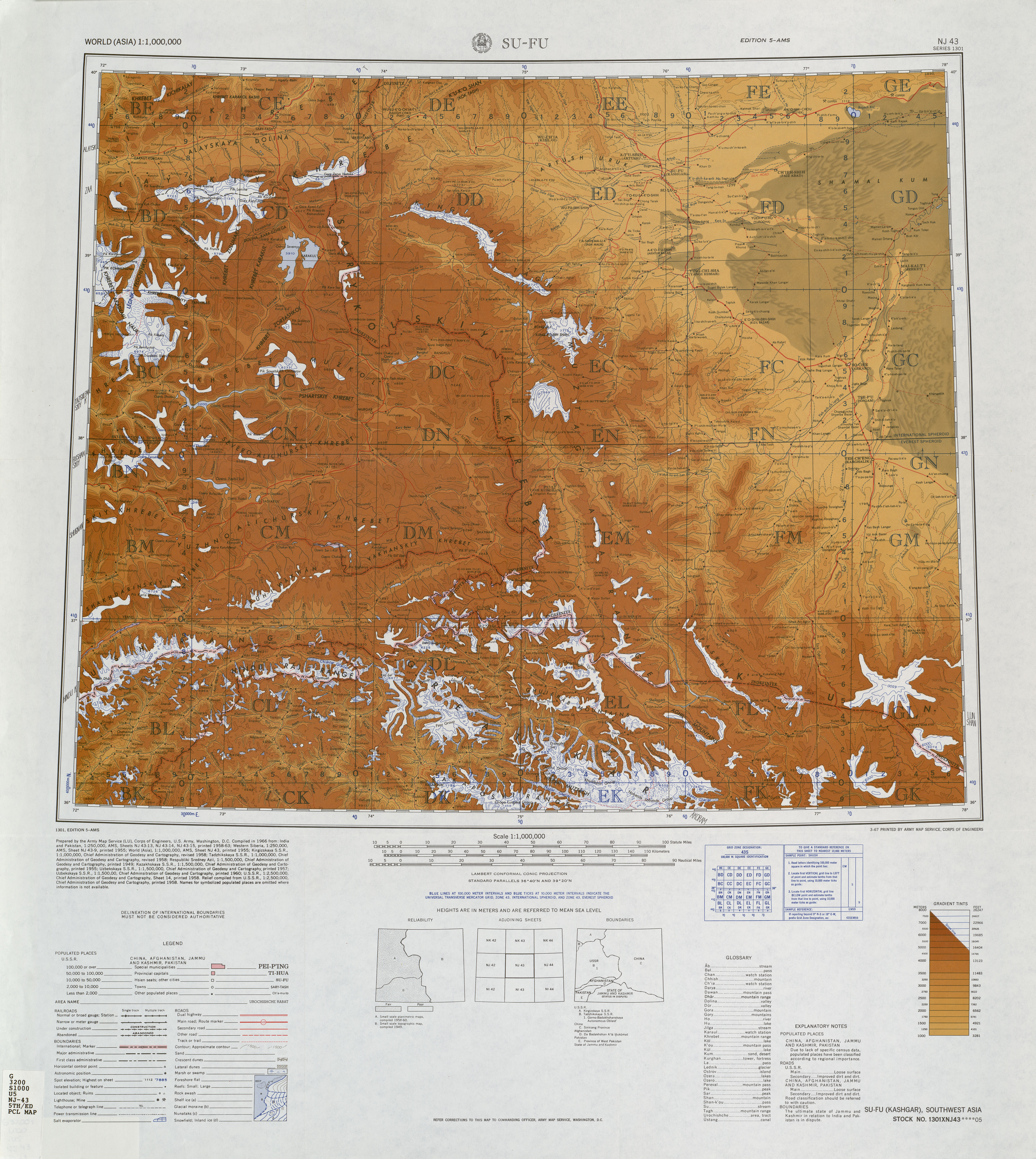
From the International Map of the World (AMS, 1966) (Note: From map: "DELINEATION OF INTERNATIONAL BOUNDARIES MUST NOT BE CONSIDERED AUTHORITATIVE")

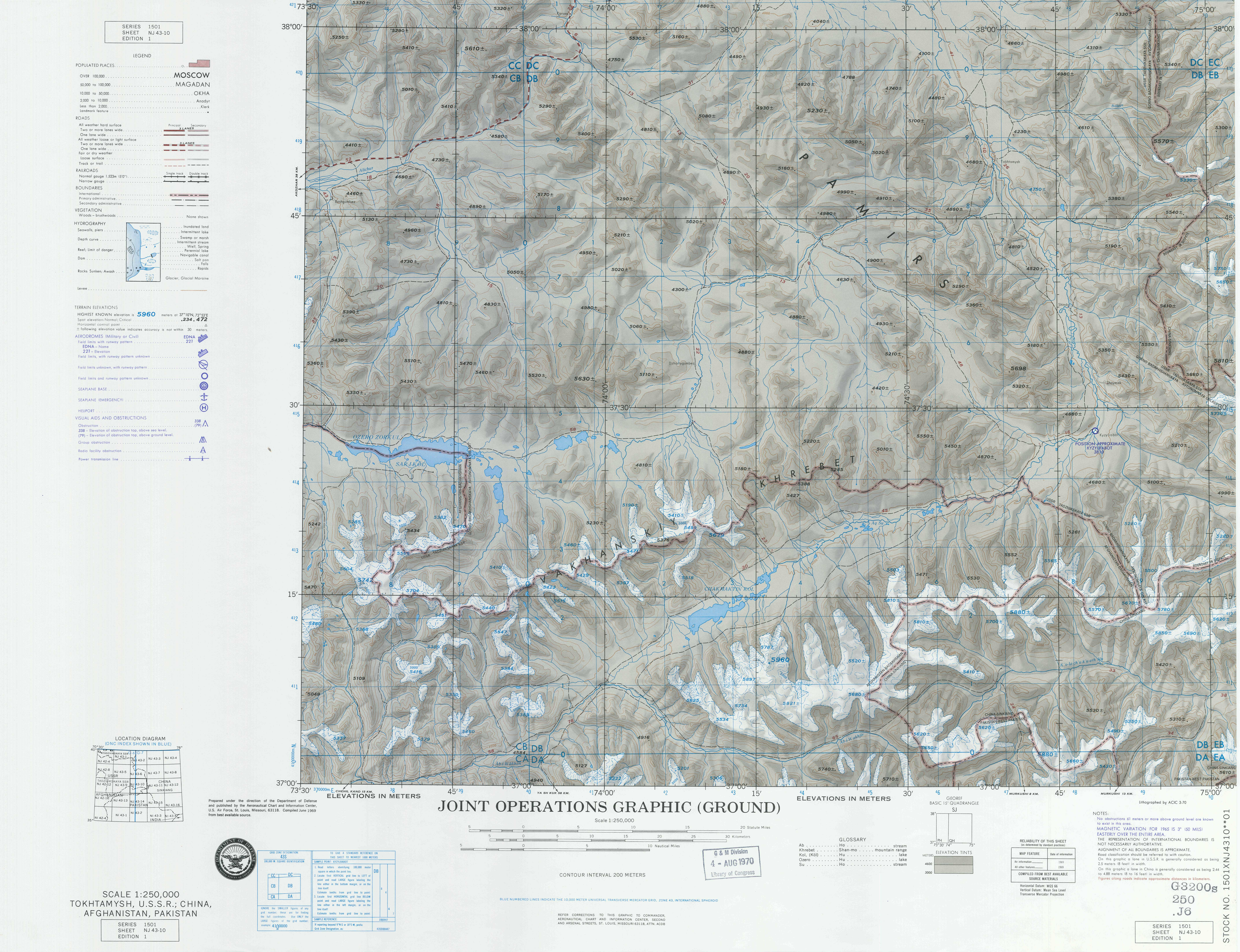
Map including Afghanistan–China border (ACIC, 1969)

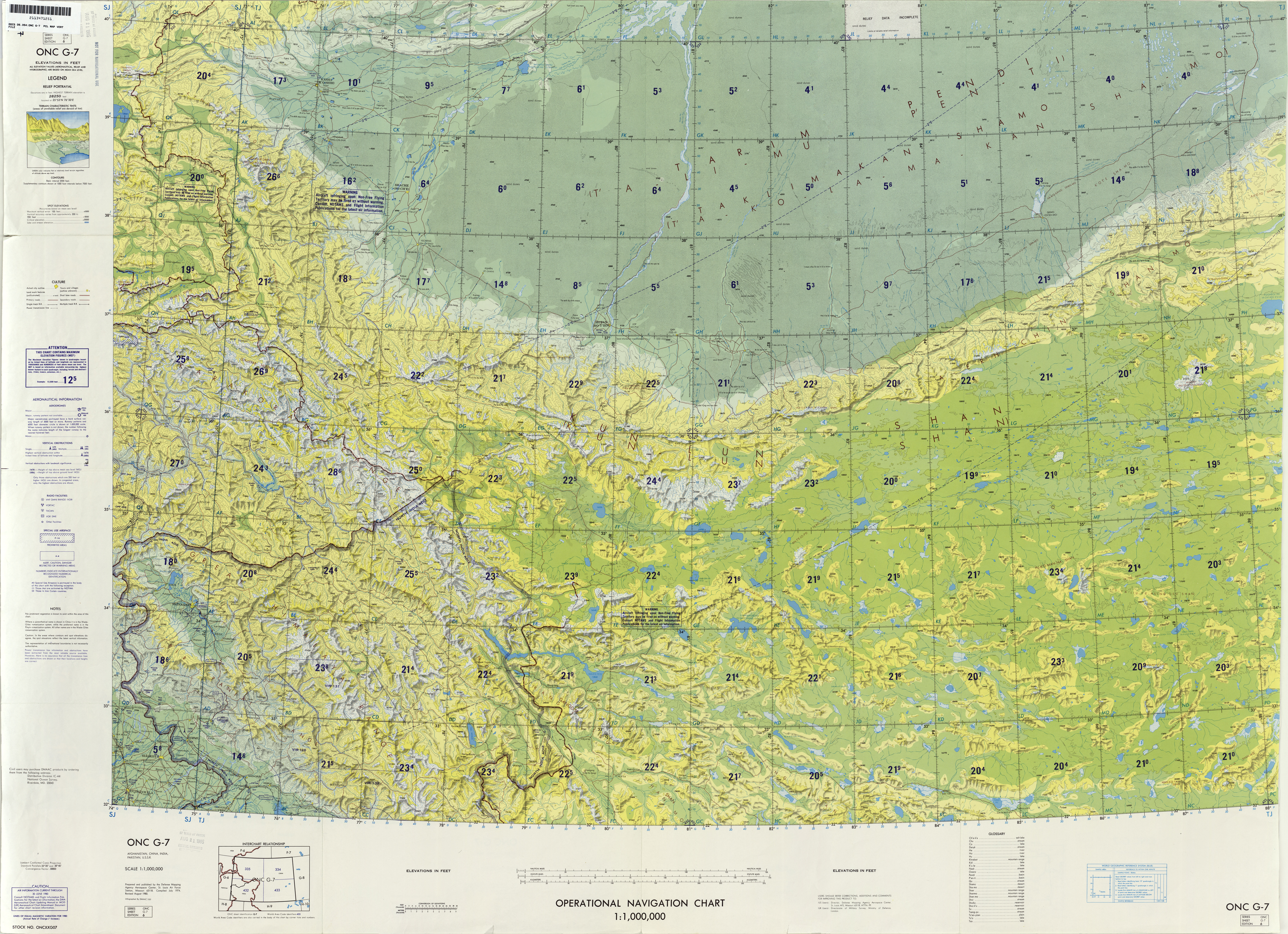
Border region (DMA, 1980) (Note: From map: "The representation of international boundaries is not necessarily authoritative.")

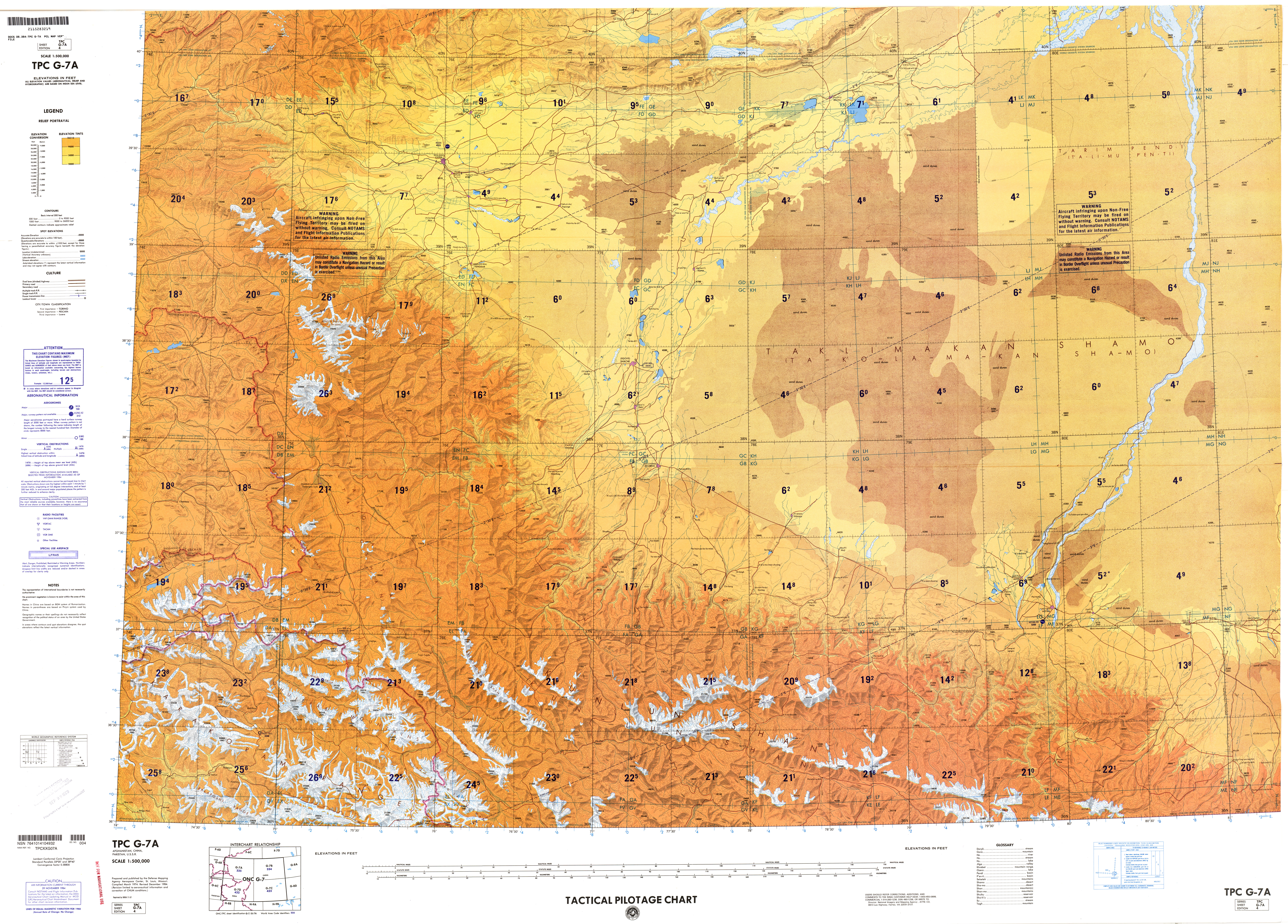
Border region (DMA, 1984) (Note: From map: "The representation of international boundaries is not necessarily authoritative")

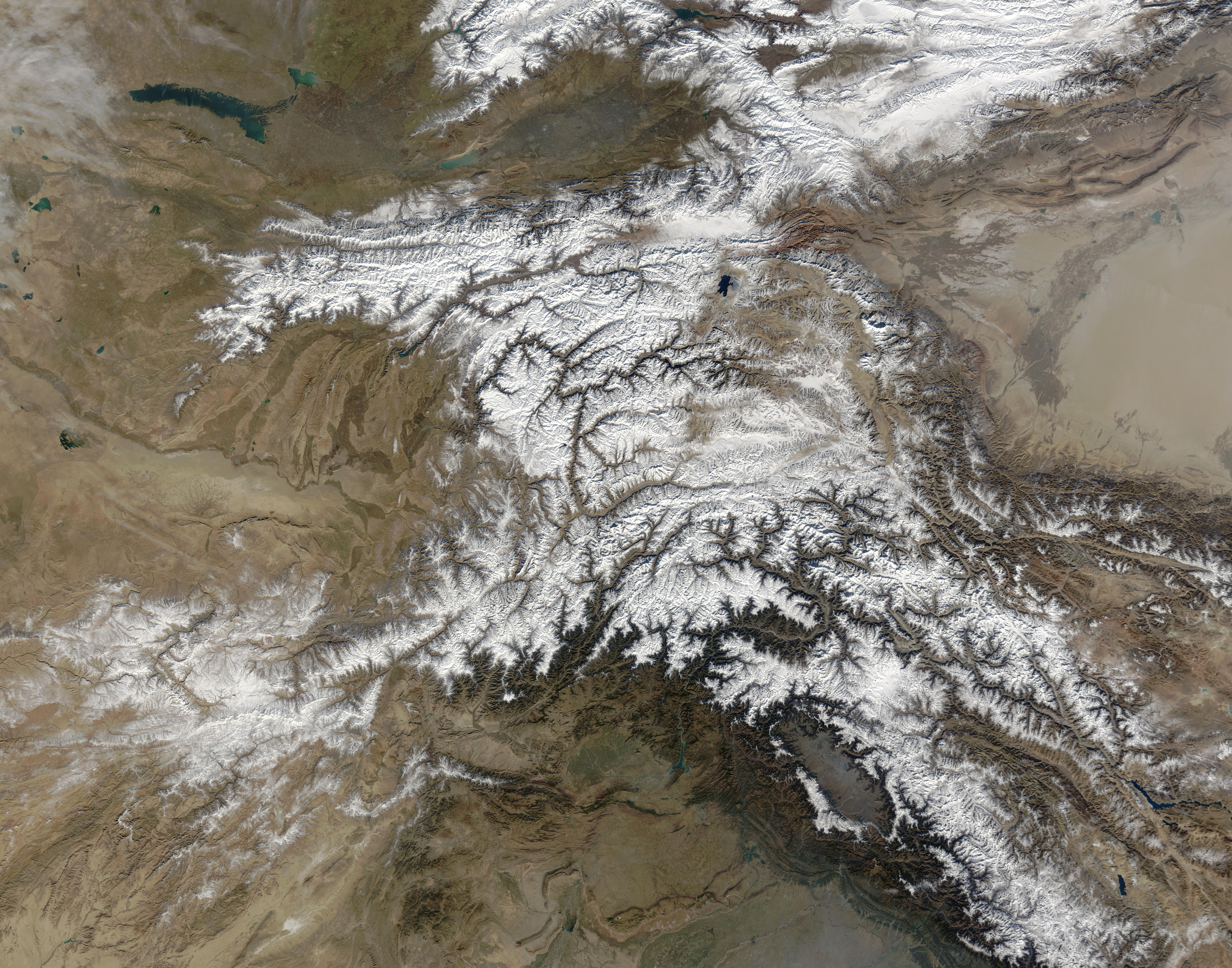
Satellite image of the region with the Afghanistan–China border marked

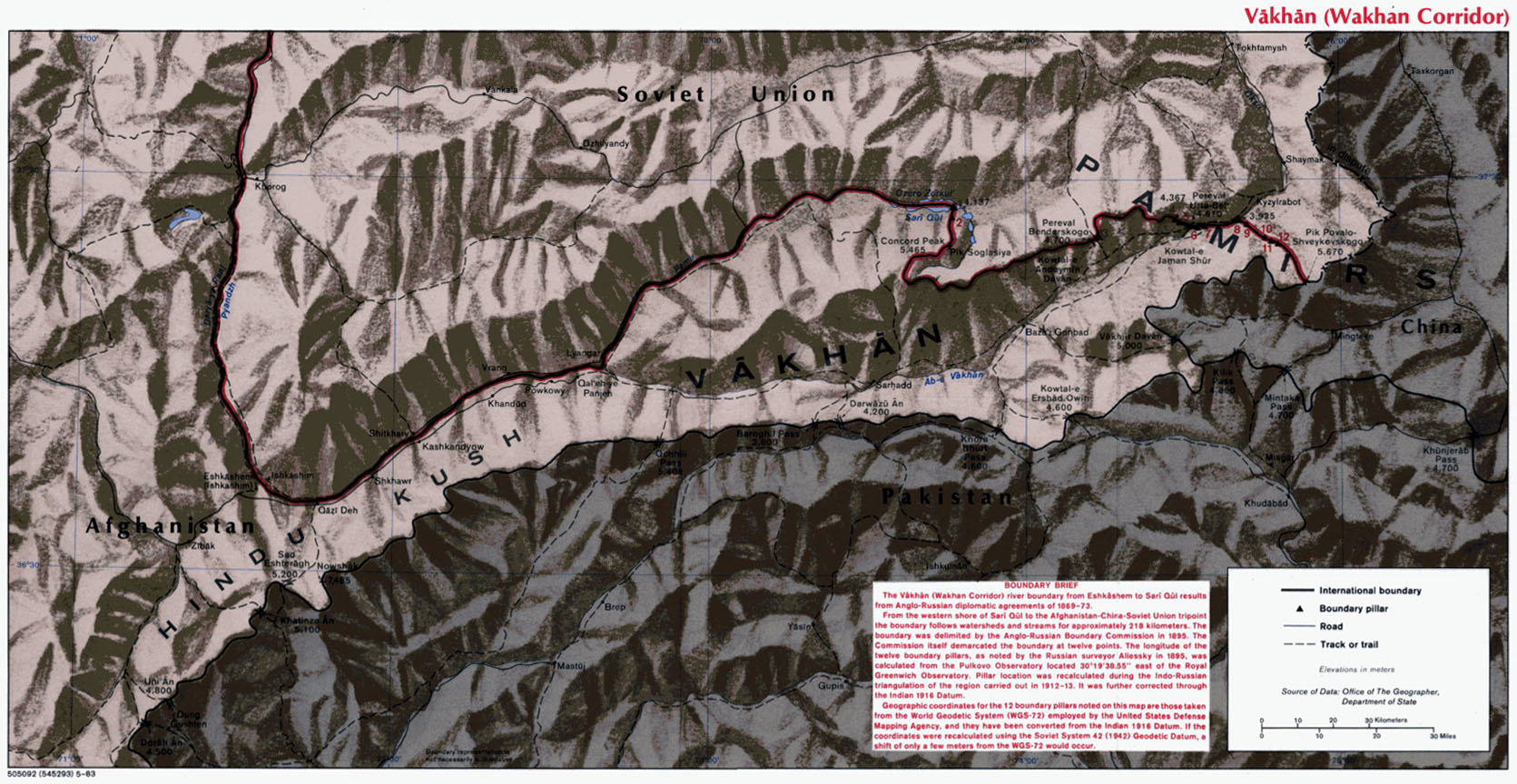
Wakhan Corridor including Afghanistan–China border

== See also ==
- China–Tajikistan border
- China–Pakistan border
- Afghanistan–China relations
