= Wakhan National Park =

National park in Wakhan, Badakhshan, Afghanistan

- IUCN category II (national park)
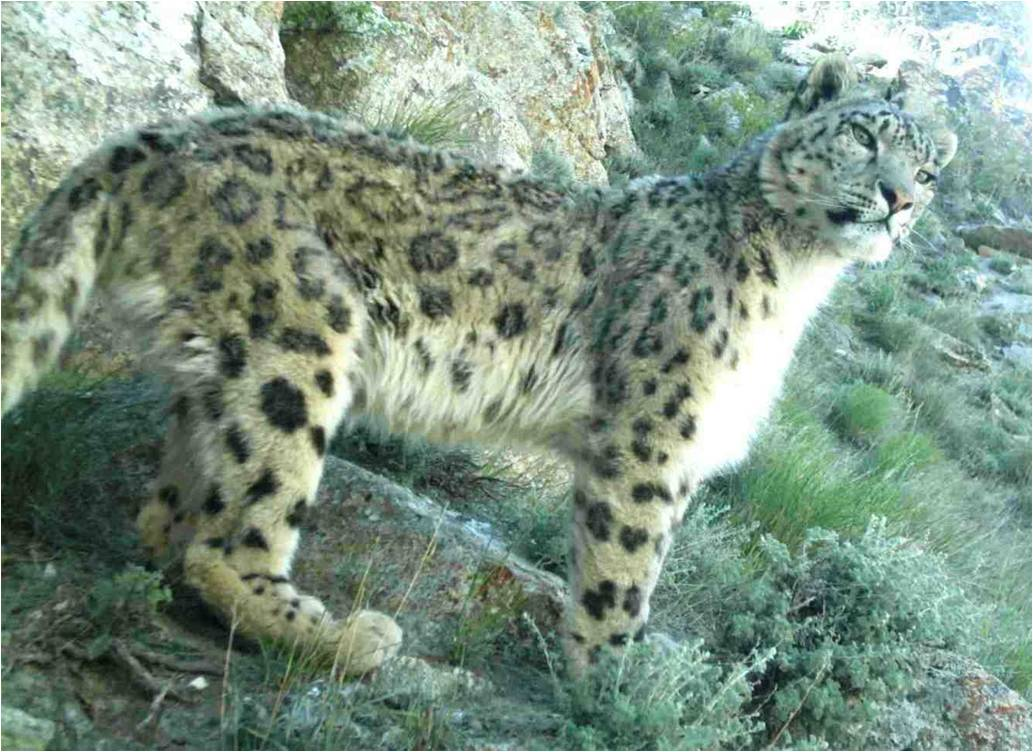
- Snow leopard in the Wakhan District

- Location within Afghanistan
- Location: Wakhan District, Afghanistan
- Coordinates: 36°48′N 72°18′E
- Area: 10,910.12 km^{2} (4,212.42 sq mi)
- Established: 30 March 2014

Wakhan National Park is a national park in northeastern Afghanistan. Established in 2014, the park encompasses the entire Wakhan District of Badakhshan Province, extending along the Wakhan Corridor between the Pamir Mountains and the Hindu Kush, bordering the Gorno-Badakhshan autonomous region of Tajikistan to the north, Khyber Pakhtunkhwa and Gilgit-Baltistan in Pakistan to the south, and the Xinjiang autonomous region of China to the east.

Flora and fauna in the Wakhan National Park include some 600 plant species, the snow leopard, lynx, wolf, brown bear, stone marten, red fox, Pallas's cat, ibex, Marco Polo sheep, and urial. Remote and largely above the tree line, poaching and overgrazing, rather than mining and logging, currently pose the main threats. Around 15,000 Afghans of ethnic Wakhi and Kyrgyz background reside in the area. Foreigners must have an Afghan visa to tour the area.

== See also ==
- List of protected areas of Afghanistan
- Wildlife of Afghanistan
- Wakhan
- Wakhan Corridor
