= 2021 Rasht earthquake =

Magnitude 5.7 earthquake in Tajikistan

- Location within Tajikistan
- UTC time: 2021-07-10 02:14:43
- ISC event: 620787256
- USGS-ANSS: ComCat
- Local date: July 10, 2021
- Local time: 07:14 TJT (UTC+5)
- Magnitude: 5.7 M_{w}
- Depth: 11.8 km (7.3 mi)
- Epicenter: 38.917°N 70.554°E
- Areas affected: Tajikistan
- Max. intensity: MMI VII (Very strong)
- Aftershocks: 23 (As of July 29 2021); Strongest is M_{w} 5.0
- Casualties: 5 dead 30 injured

On July 10 2021, a 5.7 magnitude earthquake struck 20 km southeast of the Rasht Valley in Tajikistan.

== Tectonic setting ==
Tajikistan lies within the complex zone of collision between the Indian plate and the Eurasian plate. The dominant structures in this area are a combination of thrust faults and sinistral (left lateral) strike-slip faults.

== Earthquake ==
The earthquake occurred at 07:14 am local time on July 10, 2021, and was located 165 km (103 mi) northwest of the capital Dushanbe. It was followed by 20 aftershocks. The earthquake struck at the 72nd anniversary of the 1949 Khait earthquake.

== Impact ==
Five people were killed. The victims were a 70-year old mother and four children between the ages of 6 and 12 who died in Tajikabad District. 30 people were also injured, and 5,560 people were displaced. Hundreds of homes were damaged or destroyed, including 300 in Langarisho jamoat, seven in Hijborak, and 12 in Ashkalon.

== Other events ==
A deep 5.9 magnitude earthquake struck the Gorno-Badakhshan region near the border with Xinjiang, China on February 12, 2021. In the Kashmir region of Pakistan, a woman fell and died while she was in a panic, and several others were injured.

== See also ==
- List of earthquakes in 2021
- List of earthquakes in Tajikistan
- 2015 Tajikistan earthquake
- 1989 Gissar earthquake
- 1911 Sarez earthquake
