= List of earthquakes in Tajikistan =

This list of earthquakes in Tajikistan, is a list of notable earthquakes that have affected the area currently defined as Tajikistan.

== Earthquakes ==
Date	Place	Lat	Lon	Deaths	Injuries	Mag.	MMI	Comments	Ref
2025-04-13	Districts under Central Government Jurisdiction	38.980	70.790	1	11	5.8 M_{w}	VIII	Severe damage	
2023-03-22	Sughd	36.523	69.953		3	5.8 M_{w}	VII	Severe damage	
2021-10-07	Rasht	38.959	70.572	5	30	5.7 M_{w}	VII	20+ buildings destroyed	
2021-02-12	Gorno-Badakhshan	38.136	73.545	1	5	5.9 M_{w}	IV	Minor damage	
2018-05-09	Gorno-Badakhshan	36.994	71.382		2	6.2 M_{w}	IV	Minor damage	
2018-03-29	Roghun	38.716	69.978			5.7 M_{w}	VII	Dozens of houses damaged	
2017-05-03	Lakhsh	39.494	71.444		1	6.0 M_{w}	VII	Severe damage	
2015-12-07	Gorno-Badakhshan	38.26	72.77	2	Dozens	7.2 M_{w}	VII	Many homes destroyed	
2012-05-13	Districts of Republican Subordination	38.61	70.35	1		5.7 M_{w}	VII	Many buildings destroyed / livestock killed	
2011-07-19	Fergana Valley	40.05	71.44	14	86	6.2 M_{w}	VIII		
2010-01-02	Gorno-Badakhshan	38.245	71.467			5.4 M_{w}	IV	20,000 people homeless	
2007-07-21	Rasht	38.936	70.485	12		5.2 M_{w}	VI	Most deaths from a landslide	
2006-07-29	Khatlon Province	37.26	68.83	3	19	5.6 M_{w}			
2002-01-09	Roghun	38.673	69.902	3	50	5.3 M_{w}	V	Moderate damage	
1991-01-31	Afghanistan	35.99	70.42	3	200	6.9 M_{w}	VII	545 people killed in Afghanistan, and 300 in Pakistan.	
1989-01-22	Gissar	38.47	68.69	274	Many	5.3 M_{b}	VII		
1985-10-13	Kayrakum	40.3	69.82	29	80	5.9 M_{s}	IX	Extreme damage / many homes destroyed	NGDC 1972
1984-10-26	Djirgital	39.16	71.33			6.1 M_{s}	VII	Moderate damage / some homes destroyed	NGDC 1972
1977-01-31		40.04	70.85			5.9 M_{s}		Moderate damage	NGDC 1972
1949-07-10	Gharm Oblast	39.2	70.8	7,200		7.5 M_{w}	IX		
1930-09-22	Dushanbe	38.4	68.5	175		6.3 M_{w}			
1911-02-18	Rushon District	38.2	72.8	90		7.4 M_{s}	IX		
1907-10-21	Karatag	38.5	67.9	12,000–15,000		7.4 M_{s}	IX		
Note: The inclusion criteria for adding events are based on WikiProject Earthquakes' notability guideline that was developed for stand alone articles. The principles described also apply to lists. In summary, only damaging, injurious, or deadly events should be recorded.

== See also ==
- Geology of Tajikistan
