= Landslide dam =

Natural damming of a river by some kind of landslides

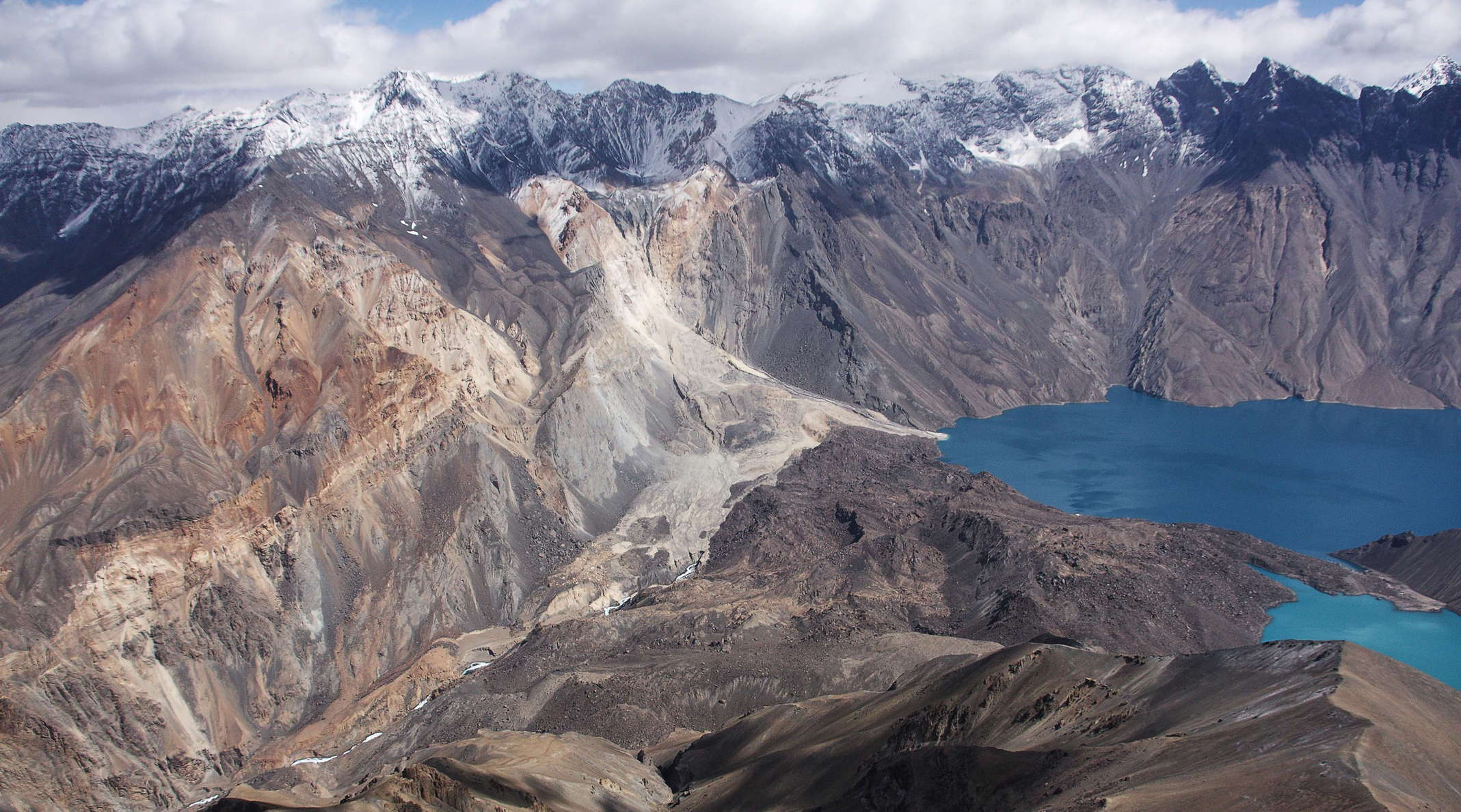
Usoi Dam, caused by a landslide in 1911. At 567 metres (1,860 ft) high, it is the tallest dam in the world.

A landslide dam is the natural damming of a river by some kind of landslide, such as a debris flow, rock avalanche or volcanic eruption. In the situation of a landslide, the rising river flow by concentration behind the natural landslide dam forms into a body of water called the barrier lake. If the damming landslide is caused by an earthquake, it may also be called a quake lake. Some landslide dams are as high as the largest existing artificial dam.

== Causes ==
The major causes for landslide dams investigated by 1986 are landslides from excessive precipitation and earthquakes, which account for 84%. Volcanic eruptions account for a further 7% of dams. Other causes of landslides account for the remaining 9%.

== Consequences ==
The water impounded by a landslide dam may create a dam reservoir (lake) that may last for a short time, to several thousand years.

Because of their rather loose nature and absence of controlled spillway, landslide dams frequently fail catastrophically and lead to downstream flooding, often with high casualties. A common failure scenario is overflowing with subsequent dam breach and erosion by the overflow stream.

Landslide dams are responsible for two types of flooding: backflooding (upstream flooding) upon creation and downstream flooding upon failure. Compared with catastrophic downflooding, relative slow backflooding typically presents little life hazard, but property damage can be substantial.

Profiles of the dam reservoir and groundwater upstream (the landslide dam is not shown in the figure)

Groundwater after dam failure downstream

While the dam is being filled, the surrounding groundwater level rises. The dam failure may trigger further catastrophic processes. As the water level drops rapidly, the uncompensated groundwater hydraulic pressure may initiate additional landslides. Those that fall into the dam reservoir may lead to further catastrophic spillages. Moreover, the resulting flood may undercut the sides of the river valley to further produce landslides downstream.

After forming, the dam leads to aggradation of the valley upstream, and dam failure leads to aggradation downstream.

Construction engineers responsible for the design of artificial dams and other structures in river valleys must take into account the potential of such events leading to abrupt changes in river's regimen.

== Coping method ==
Different coping methods might be applied according to the geographical location, environment, water storage capacity, breaching impact, coping cost, engineering difficulties and urgency.

- Continuous monitoring, evacuation
- Excavation or blasting
- Drainage or siphoning

== Examples ==
- The highest known landslide dam of historic times is the Usoi Dam in modern Tajikistan created by a landslide triggered by an earthquake on 18 February 1911. It dammed the Murghab River to the height of 570 m (1,860 ft) to impound Sarez Lake, 505 m (1,657 ft) deep.
- Lake Waikaremoana in New Zealand was formed by a 250 m (820 ft) high landslide dam believed to be 2,200 years old. Between 1935 and 1950 the landslide was tunnelled and sealed to stabilise it so it could be used for hydroelectric power generation. This appears to be the first example of modification of a natural landslide dam for power generation.
- Attabad Lake in Pakistan was formed by a landslide in 2010, 100 m (330 ft) high
- The Red Lake (Romanian: Lacul Roşu) is a barrier lake in the Eastern Carpathians chain in Harghita County, Romania. The name of "Lacul Roşu" comes from the reddish alluvia deposited in the lake by the Red Creek.
- The Gros Ventre landslide is an example of a huge, short-lived and devastating landslide dam, 60 m (200 ft) high.
- The Lynmouth Flood of 15–16 August 1952 was partly the result of the formation and subsequent failure of a landslide dam on the East Lyn River, sending a wave of water and debris into the town and killing 34 people.
- Quake Lake, created in Montana in 1959, 58 m (190 ft) high.
- The Tangjiashan Lake, a dangerous "quake lake", was created as a result of the 2008 Sichuan earthquake. It was located in the extremely rugged terrain of Tangjiashan Mountain. Chinese engineers, scientists, and soldiers were involved in the digging of a sluice to alleviate the dangers of this, one of the 34 landslide dams created by the magnitude 8.0 earthquake in Sichuan. On 10 June 2008, the lake started to drain via the sluice, flooding the evacuated town of Beichuan. (52 m (171 ft) high).
- The Riñihuazo begun on 22 May 1960, after a landslide caused by the Great Chilean earthquake blocked Riñihue Lake's outflow. According to the chronicler Mariño de Lobera a similar event occurred after the 1575 Valdivia earthquake. It is 26 m (85 ft) high.
- The 2014 Oso mudslide dammed the Stillaguamish River in March 2014, creating a lake that blocked Washington State Route 530 and hampered rescue/recovery efforts.
- Among the most destructive landslide lake outburst floods in recorded history occurred in the Sichuan province on 10 June 1786, when the dam on the Dadu River burst, causing a flood that extended 1,400 km (870 mi) downstream and killed 100,000 people.
- The largest landslide dam in Britain impounds Tal-y-llyn Lake (Llyn Mwyngil) beside Cadair Idris in Snowdonia National Park, Wales. It was first recognised by E Watson in 1962. It is probably over 10,000 years old.
- Moklishko Ezero in North Macedonia
- Trebenishko Ezero, near Trebenishta in North Macedonia
- The 1139 Ganja earthquake triggered a massive landslide on Mount Kapaz in Azerbaijan, damming the Kürəkçay River and forming Lake Göygöl. The earthquake resulted in as many as 300,000 deaths.
- On 23 September 2025, the Fata'an Creek Barrier Lake in Taiwan, which formed following a massive landslide caused by Tropical Storm Wipha in July, overflowed due to heavy rains caused by Typhoon Ragasa, causing flooding in three townships of Hualien County. At least 18 people were killed while 107 others were injured and six went missing.

== See also ==
- Volcanic dam
