= List of earthquakes in 1989 =

Earthquakes in 1989
Approximate epicenters of the earthquakes in 1989
- 4.0–5.9 magnitude
- 6.0–6.9 magnitude
- 7.0–7.9 magnitude
- 8.0+ magnitude
- Strongest magnitude: 8.0 M_{w} Australia
- Deadliest: 5.3 M_{w} (Tajik Soviet Socialist Republic) Tajik Soviet Socialist Republic; 274 deaths
- Total fatalities: 677

Number by magnitude
- 9.0+: 0

This is a list of earthquakes in 1989. Only earthquakes of magnitude 6 or above are included, unless they result in damage or casualties, or are notable for some other reason. All dates are listed according to UTC time.

== By death toll ==
Rank	Death toll	Magnitude	Location	MMI	Depth (km)	Date
1	274	5.3	(Soviet Union) Tajik Soviet Socialist Republic, Districts of Republican Subordination	VII (Very strong)	33.0	January 22
2	120	6.3	Indonesia, Papua	VIII (Severe)	14.3	August 1
3	114	6.0	Iran, Fars	VI (Strong)	30.5	May 27
4	63	6.9	United States, California	IX (Violent)	17.2	October 17
5	30	5.9	Algeria, Tipaza	VIII (Severe)	10.0	October 29
6	29	5.4	China, Shanxi	V (Moderate)	10.0	October 18
7	13	5.4	Australia, New South Wales	VIII (Severe)	10.0	December 28
8	11	6.4	China, Sichuan	VII (Very strong)	13.3	April 15

== By magnitude ==
Rank	Magnitude	Death toll	Location	MMI	Depth (km)	Date
1	8.0	0	Australia, Macquarie Island offshore	V (Moderate)	10.0	May 23
2	7.6	1	Philippines, Mindanao offshore	VII (Very strong)	24.4	December 15
3	7.4	0	Japan, Iwate offshore	VI (Strong)	28.6	November 1
4	7.1	0	Indonesia, Molucca Sea offshore	V (Moderate)	44.0	February 10
4	7.1	0	Brazil, Acre	I (Not felt)	593.4	May 5
4	7.1	0	Papua New Guinea, Morobe	VII (Very strong)	104.4	December 7
7	7.0	0	United States, Alaska offshore	V (Moderate)	11.0	September 4
7	7.0	0	New Zealand, Kermadec Islands offshore	IV (Light)	43.8	May 14

== By month ==
=== January ===
January
- Strongest magnitude: 6.7 M_{w} Indonesia
- Deadliest: 5.3 M_{w} Tajik SSR; 274 deaths
- Total fatalities: 274

Number by magnitude
- 8.0–8.9: 0
- 7.0–7.9: 0
- 6.0–6.9: 10

Date	Country and location	M_{w}	Depth (km)	MMI	Notes	Casualties	
Date	Country and location	M_{w}	Depth (km)	MMI	Notes	Dead	Injured
1	Iran, Hormozgan	4.5	55.7	III	Minor damage occurred in Bastak.	-	-
2	Tonga, Vava‘u offshore	6.2	108.4	I	-	-	-
6	France, Midi-Pyrénées	4.9	22.7	V	Slight damage occurred in La Mongie.	-	-
8	United States, Alaska offshore, Andreanof Islands	6.0	33.0	III	-	-	-
9	Soviet Union, Russian Soviet Federative Socialist Republic, Kuril Islands offshore	6.5	13.5	I	-	-	-
10	Indonesia, Maluku	6.7	46.6	VII	-	-	-
12	Soviet Union, Russian Soviet Federative Socialist Republic, Kuril Islands offshore	6.1	33.0	I	Aftershock of the January 9 event.	-	-
17	Papua New Guinea, West New Britain offshore	6.4	31.8	IV	-	-	-
19	central East Pacific Rise	6.0	10.0	I	-	-	-
19	United States, California offshore	5.0	11.6	VI	Several people were injured, some windows were broken and items were knocked off shelves in the Malibu-Santa Monica-Redondo Beach area. Slight damage occurred at Hollywood, Lancaster, Los Angeles, Malibu and Monterey Park.	-	Several
22	Soviet Union, Kazakh Soviet Socialist Republic, East Kazakhstan	6.1	0.0	I	Nuclear explosion.	-	-
22	Japan, Hokkaido offshore	6.2	25.0	III	-	-	-
22	Soviet Union, Tajik Soviet Socialist Republic, Districts of Republican Subordination	5.3	33.0	VII	1989 Gissar earthquake: 274 people were killed, many were injured, and extensive damage occurred mostly due to mudslides that destroyed Sharora and two other villages.	274	Many
24	Japan, Hokkaido offshore	5.5	50.3	IV	Minor damage occurred in Urakawa.	-	-
25	South Africa, Free State	5.5	5.0	VII	Minor damage occurred in Welkom.	-	-
27	Hungarian People's Republic, Vas	4.4	22.1	IV	Minor damage occurred in Ajka, Vas, and Zala counties.	-	-
27	Soviet Union, Russian Soviet Federative Socialist Republic, Kamchatka offshore	6.3	28.4	I	-	-	-
30	United States, Utah	5.2	19.0	VI	Slight damage occurred at Aurora, Emery, Ferron, Koosharem, Salina, Sterling and Wales.	-	-

=== February ===
February
- Strongest magnitude: 7.1 M_{w} Indonesia
- Deadliest: 5.6 M_{w} Japan; 1 death
- Total fatalities: 1

Number by magnitude
- 8.0–8.9: 0
- 7.0–7.9: 1
- 6.0–6.9: 10

Date	Country and location	M_{w}	Depth (km)	MMI	Notes	Casualties	
Date	Country and location	M_{w}	Depth (km)	MMI	Notes	Dead	Injured
4	Panama offshore	6.3	10.0	I	-	-	-
4	Papua New Guinea, East New Britain offshore	6.2	52.2	V	-	-	-
10	Indonesia, Molucca Sea offshore	7.1	44.0	V	-	-	-
12	Cuba, Guantánamo offshore	5.2	59.6	IV	Minor damage occurred in Santiago de Cuba, Maisí, and Guantánamo.	-	-
14	Solomon Islands, Makira offshore	6.5	31.9	VI	-	-	-
14	United States, Washington	4.0	-0.8	V	Minor damage occurred in the Big Lake Elementary School.	-	-
16	southern East Pacific Rise	6.2	10.0	I	-	-	-
19	Japan, Saitama	5.6	60.4	V	One person was killed and another was injured.	1	1
19	Vanuatu, Sanma	6.0	101.2	V	-	-	-
22	United States, Alaska offshore	6.0	33.0	I	-	-	-
24	Turkey, Denizli	5.3	18.5	VI	Slight damage occurred in Denizli.	-	-
25	New Zealand, Kermadec Islands offshore	6.8	30.5	V	-	-	-
26	Costa Rica, San José	5.4	22.5	VII	Minor damage and some landslides was caused in the Guaitil-San Marcos area.	-	-
27	Indonesia, North Maluku offshore	6.4	53.7	VI	Six schools and a number of buildings were damaged in Galela.	-	-
28	Paraguay, Boquerón	6.5	569.0	IV	-	-	-
28	Indonesia, Maluku	6.2	196.4	IV	-	-	-

=== March ===
March
- Strongest magnitude: 6.9 M_{w} Tonga
- Deadliest: 6.3 M_{w} Malawi; 9 deaths
- Total fatalities: 10

Number by magnitude
- 8.0–8.9: 0
- 7.0–7.9: 0
- 6.0–6.9: 7

Date	Country and location	M_{w}	Depth (km)	MMI	Notes	Casualties	
Date	Country and location	M_{w}	Depth (km)	MMI	Notes	Dead	Injured
5	Kirghiz Soviet Socialist Republic, Chüy	4.8	33.0	VI	Minor damage occurred in the epicentral area.	-	-
6	Japan, Chiba	6.1	42.1	V	-	-	-
8	Indonesia, Molucca Sea offshore	6.1	31.9	V	233 houses and public buildings were damaged and 5,500 people were left homeless on Morotai. 16 houses were damaged and some were left homeless at Tanawangu.	-	-
10	Brazil, Rio Grande do Norte	5.0	10.0	VI	Slight damage occurred in Natal.	-	-
10	Turkey, Erzurum	4.4	10.0	V	10 houses collapsed and another 120 others were damaged in Kars and Erzurum.	-	-
10	Papua New Guinea, New Ireland	5.8	53.3	V	One person was killed by a landslide in Rabaul.	1	-
10	Malawi, Central	6.3	28.0	VIII	1989 Malawi earthquake: Nine people were killed (six in Dedza, two in Salima, and one in Mohinji), and a hundred others were injured. Major damage was caused, and 50,000 lost their homes.	9	100
11	Tonga, Vava‘u offshore	6.9	230.1	I	-	-	-
13	West Germany, Hesse	5.4	1.0	-	The earthquake occurred as a result of a rockburst triggered by blasting at the Ernst Thaelmann Mine near Merkers. Three people were injured and 80 percent of buildings were damaged in Voelkershausen.	-	3
16	New Zealand, Kermadec Islands offshore	6.0	37.4	III	-	-	-
17	New Zealand, Kermadec Islands offshore	6.2	59.2	I	-	-	-
19	Greece, Thessaly offshore	5.4	10.0	VI	Minor damage occurred in Skiathos.	-	-
26	Brazil, Rio Grande do Norte	4.4	10.0	VII	Minor damage occurred in eastern Ceará.	-	-
30	Armenian Soviet Socialist Republic, Shirak	4.6	10.0	V	Some damage occurred in Spitak, where 270 cattle were killed. It is an aftershock of the 1988 Armenian earthquake.	-	-
30	Tonga, Ha'apai offshore	6.0	230.0	I	-	-	-

=== April ===
April
- Strongest magnitude: 6.9 M_{w} Mexico; 6.9 M_{w} Vanuatu
- Deadliest: 6.4 M_{w} China; 11 deaths
- Total fatalities: 14

Number by magnitude
- 8.0–8.9: 0
- 7.0–7.9: 0
- 6.0–6.9: 16

Date	Country and location	M_{w}	Depth (km)	MMI	Notes	Casualties	
Date	Country and location	M_{w}	Depth (km)	MMI	Notes	Dead	Injured
3	United States, California	4.5	11.3	VI	Slight damage occurred in San Jose.	-	-
5	Chile, Tarapacá	6.2	112.0	IV	-	-	-
6	Vanuatu, Tafea offshore	6.9	165.7	V	-	-	-
7	United States, California	4.8	12.6	VI	Slight damage occurred in Corona del Mar, Costa Mesa and Newport Beach.	-	-
8	Tonga, Niuas offshore	6.0	32.7	I	-	-	-
11	Russia, Kamchatka offshore	6.8	16.4	V	-	-	-
11	Greece, West Greece	4.4	10.0	V	Minor damage occurred in Leondion.	-	-
15	China, Sichuan	6.4	13.3	VII	Four people were killed, another 5 were injured and considerable damage was caused in Batang. Another seven people were killed, at least 37 others injured and additional damage occurred in the area due to a number of aftershocks.	11	42
16	Fiji offshore	6.3	609.7	I	-	-	-
18	Tonga offshore, south of the Fiji Islands	6.1	523.7	I	-	-	-
20	Russia, Sakha	6.4	26.3	VI	-	-	-
25	China, Sichuan	6.1	7.7	VII	Considerable damage occurred in Batang County. Aftershock of the 6.4 event on April 15.	-	-
25	Mexico, Guerrero	6.9	19.2	VII	Three people were killed, a few were injured, and some damage occurred in Mexico City. Minor damage occurred in Acapulco.	3	Few
27	Japan, Izu Islands offshore	6.3	84.6	II	-	-	-
27	United States, Missouri	4.3	11.7	VI	Slight damage occurred in Steele.	-	-
28	Turkey, Muğla offshore	5.6	16.9	VI	Slight damage occurred in Milas.	-	-
28	Indonesia, Bengkulu offshore	6.0	27.4	I	-	-	-
28	South Georgia and the South Sandwich Islands offshore	6.0	22.3	I	-	-	-
28	Indonesia, Bengkulu offshore	6.1	32.4	I	-	-	-
30	Venezuela, Falcón	6.0	20.3	VII	Slight damage occurred in Valencia.	-	-
30	Fiji, Eastern offshore	6.0	570.3	I	-	-	-

=== May ===
May
- Strongest magnitude: 8.0 M_{w} Australia
- Deadliest: 6.0 M_{w} Iran; 114 deaths
- Total fatalities: 115

Number by magnitude
- 8.0–8.9: 1
- 7.0–7.9: 2
- 6.0–6.9: 13

Date	Country and location	M_{w}	Depth (km)	MMI	Notes	Casualties	
Date	Country and location	M_{w}	Depth (km)	MMI	Notes	Dead	Injured
3	China, Sichuan	6.2	14.0	VII	It is an aftershock of the 6.4 quake on April 15. Additional damage was caused, and two people were injured by a landslide that buried a highway between Chengdu and Batang.	-	2
3	Iran, Fars	5.2	33.0	IV	Four people were injured and seven villages were severely damaged in Mamasani.	-	4
4	Venezuela, Falcón offshore	5.5	15.5	VI	It is an aftershock of the 6.0 event in April 30. Additional damage was caused, and 2,000 people were displaced in Tucacas.	-	-
5	Brazil, Acre	7.1	593.4	I	-	-	-
7	China, Yunnan	5.6	33.0	IV	One person died, 91 others were injured, and 5,300 houses were destroyed in Gengma.	1	91
8	Tonga offshore, south of the Fiji Islands	6.3	548.2	I	-	-	-
9	United States, Washington	4.5	14.6	VI	Slight damage occurred in Okanogan.	-	-
14	New Zealand, Kermadec Islands offshore	7.0	43.8	IV	-	-	-
14	Mid-Indian Ridge	6.0	10.0	I	-	-	-
15	Greece, West Greece	4.8	34.0	IV	Minor damage occurred in Patras.	-	-
15	Solomon Islands, Guadalcanal offshore	6.1	23.6	V	-	-	-
17	Russia, Sakha	6.0	30.7	VI	Aftershock of the 6.4 event on April 20.	-	-
19	United States, Alaska offshore	6.3	104.0	V	-	-	-
20	New Zealand, Kermadec Islands offshore	6.3	29.2	I	Aftershock of the 7.0 event on May 14.	-	-
20	Turkey, Tunceli	5.4	38.2	V	Twenty houses were damaged and several cattle were killed in Erzincan.	-	-
23	Australia, Macquarie Island offshore	8.0	10.0	V	Small tsunamis were observed along the coast of Tasmania, Jervis Bay and Sydney Harbour.	-	-
23	Australia, Macquarie Island offshore	6.0	10.0	I	Aftershock.	-	-
24	Russia, Kamchatka offshore	6.3	18.6	I	-	-	-
25	Australia, Macquarie Island offshore	6.0	10.0	I	Aftershock.	-	-
27	Pacific-Antarctic Ridge	6.1	10.0	I	-	-	-
27	Iran, Fars	6.0	30.5	VI	At least 114 people were killed, 17 others were injured, many houses were destroyed and 100 livestock were killed in Dogonbadan.	114	17
31	New Zealand, Fiordland	6.4	23.2	VII	-	-	-

=== June ===
June
- Strongest magnitude: 6.4 M_{w} Japan
- Deadliest: 5.8 M_{w} Bangladesh; 1 death
- Total fatalities: 1

Number by magnitude
- 8.0–8.9: 0
- 7.0–7.9: 0
- 6.0–6.9: 4

Date	Country and location	M_{w}	Depth (km)	MMI	Notes	Casualties	
Date	Country and location	M_{w}	Depth (km)	MMI	Notes	Dead	Injured
7	Greece, West Greece	5.2	25.0	V	Cracks appeared on many buildings in Kato Akhaia.	-	-
8	Ethiopia, SNNPR	4.9	18.6	VI	A few people suffered minor injuries and damage occurred in Sodo.	-	Few
11	Northern Mid-Atlantic Ridge	6.2	9.6	I	-	-	-
12	Bangladesh, Barisal	5.8	5.8	VIII	One person died, another 100 were injured and minor damage occurred in Sarankhola.	1	100
12	United States, California	4.8	15.4	VI	Slight damage occurred in Bell Gardens and in downtown Los Angeles.	-	-
16	United States, Alaska offshore	5.6	48.5	V	Slight damage occurred in Larsen Bay and in Kodiak.	-	-
16	Japan, Wakayama offshore	6.4	359.9	III	-	-	-
25	Ecuador, Esmeraldas offshore	6.3	15.1	VII	30 people were injured and 12 homes were damaged in Esmeraldas.	-	30
26	United States, Hawaii offshore	6.2	8.8	VII	Five people were slightly injured and five homes were destroyed and about 100 others damaged in the Puna District. Landslides occurred in several places and blocked a road at Honomu. Slight damage occurred in the Hawaii National Park, Hilo, Honomu and Keaau.	-	5
26	Portugal, Azores offshore	5.9	11.3	VI	Several people were slightly injured and minor damage was caused on Graciosa.	-	Several

=== July ===
July
- Strongest magnitude: 6.8 M_{w} Indonesia
- Total fatalities: 0

Number by magnitude
- 8.0–8.9: 0
- 7.0–7.9: 0
- 6.0–6.9: 7

Date	Country and location	M_{w}	Depth (km)	MMI	Notes	Casualties	
Date	Country and location	M_{w}	Depth (km)	MMI	Notes	Dead	Injured
3	Australia, Macquarie Island offshore	6.4	33.0	I	-	-	-
3	United States, Alaska offshore	6.1	33.0	IV	-	-	-
9	Japan, Shizuoka offshore	5.2	5.0	V	19 people were injured, landslides and roads cracked in Itō.	-	19
14	Indonesia, East Nusa Tenggara offshore	6.7	9.8	VII	Seven people were seriously injured and 38 buildings were damaged in Alor.	-	7
21	China, Sichuan	5.6	35.7	V	Three houses were damaged in Batang County. It is an aftershock of the 6.4 quake on April 15.	-	-
22	Indonesia, North Maluku	6.5	141.8	V	-	-	-
24	Afghanistan, Badakhshan	6.0	95.1	IV	-	-	-
24	Fiji, Western offshore	6.0	31.4	I	-	-	-
31	Indonesia, East Nusa Tenggara offshore	6.8	13.8	V	Slight damage occurred in Maumere.	-	-

=== August ===
August
- Strongest magnitude: 6.6 M_{w} Taiwan; 6.6 M_{w} Papua New Guinea
- Deadliest: 6.3 M_{w} Indonesia; 120 deaths
- Total fatalities: 124

Number by magnitude
- 8.0–8.9: 0
- 7.0–7.9: 0
- 6.0–6.9: 7

Date	Country and location	M_{w}	Depth (km)	MMI	Notes	Casualties	
Date	Country and location	M_{w}	Depth (km)	MMI	Notes	Dead	Injured
1	Indonesia, Papua offshore	6.3	14.3	VIII	1989 West Papua earthquake: 120 people were killed and 125 were injured, mostly due to landslides that buried two villages in Kurima District. Landslides also blocked the Baliem River.	120	125
3	Russia, Chechnya	5.2	18.2	VI	One person died and damage occurred in Groznyy.	1	-
3	Taiwan, Hualien offshore	6.6	10.7	V	-	-	-
3	Fiji, Central offshore	6.0	592.1	I	-	-	-
8	New Zealand, Taranaki offshore	5.6	121.6	IV	Minor damage occurred in both the North and South Islands.	-	-
8	United States, California	5.4	13.4	VII	One person died, several people suffered minor injuries and damage occurred in Los Gatos, Campbell, Saratoga, Ben Lomond, Brookdale, Cupertino, Holy City, Redwood Estates and Santa Cruz.	1	Several
10	Philippines, Soccsksargen offshore	6.1	55.8	VI	-	-	-
12	Indonesia, Molucca Sea offshore	6.1	51.0	IV	-	-	-
14	Fiji, Western	6.3	33.0	I	-	-	-
20	United States, Alabama	3.4	10.0	VI	Slight damage occurred south of Florence.	-	-
20	Djibouti, Dikhil	6.5	11.6	VII	Two people were killed, another two were injured, damage and rockslides occurred in Galafi and Yoboki. In Galafi, ground cracks were observed and four springs were destroyed. In neighboring Ethiopia, damage and rockslides occurred. Tremors were felt in Eritrea and Somalia.	2	2
21	Papua New Guinea, Bougainville offshore	6.6	493.5	I	-	-	-
21	Taiwan, Hualien offshore	6.3	42.8	IV	-	-	-
24	Azerbaijan Soviet Socialist Republic, Caspian Sea offshore	5.2	33.0	IV	Some buildings were slightly damaged in southern Dagestan.	-	-
26	Slovenia, Kočevje	2.7	10.0	V	Slight damage occurred in Klinja Vas and Kočevje.	-	-
29	Mexico, Jalisco offshore	6.5	21.4	I	-	-	-

=== September ===
September
- Strongest magnitude: 7.0 M_{w} United States
- Deadliest: 6.1 M_{w} China; 1 death
- Total fatalities: 1

Number by magnitude
- 8.0–8.9: 0
- 7.0–7.9: 1
- 6.0–6.9: 12

Date	Country and location	M_{w}	Depth (km)	MMI	Notes	Casualties	
Date	Country and location	M_{w}	Depth (km)	MMI	Notes	Dead	Injured
4	Indonesia, Papua	6.4	9.1	VII	Damage occurred in Tembagapura.	-	-
4	United States, Alaska offshore	7.0	11.0	V	-	-	-
6	Chile, Easter Island offshore	6.0	10.0	I	-	-	-
6	Indonesia, Molucca Sea offshore	6.0	36.7	I	-	-	-
13	Southern Mid-Atlantic Ridge	6.4	11.9	I	-	-	-
14	Indonesia, North Maluku offshore	6.2	103.2	V	-	-	-
16	Azerbaijan Soviet Socialist Republic, Caspian Sea offshore	6.5	54.8	VI	Some minor damage was caused.	-	-
16	Mexico, Chiapas	6.1	108.3	V	-	-	-
17	Turkmen Soviet Socialist Republic, Caspian Sea offshore	6.2	51.3	I	This event, together with the event on September 16, can be considered a doublet earthquake.	-	-
18	Turkey, Kayseri offshore	4.3	10.0	V	As many as 225 houses were damaged in Kayseri.	-	-
18	United States, Alaska offshore	6.2	33.0	I	-	-	-
22	China, Sichuan	6.1	14.6	VII	One person died, 151 people were injured, about 4,270 houses were destroyed, more than 300 animals were killed and damage was caused to bridges, highways and to a phosphorus mine in Xiaojin County.	1	151
25	Vanuatu, Tafea offshore	6.5	33.9	VI	-	-	-
30	Myanmar, Shan	5.8	13.1	VI	Damage occurred in the Muang District, in the neighboring Thailand.	-	-

=== October ===
October
- Strongest magnitude: 6.9 M_{w} United States; 6.9 M_{w} Solomon Islands; 6.9 M_{w} Japan
- Deadliest: 6.9 M_{w} United States; 63 deaths
- Total fatalities: 122

Number by magnitude
- 8.0–8.9: 0
- 7.0–7.9: 1
- 6.0–6.9: 15

Date	Country and location	M_{w}	Depth (km)	MMI	Notes	Casualties	
Date	Country and location	M_{w}	Depth (km)	MMI	Notes	Dead	Injured
1	Iran, Esfahan	5.2	33.0	IV	At least 300 homes were damaged and four roads were blocked by rockslides in Deh Borzorg-e Sisakht.	-	-
7	Vanuatu, Tafea	6.1	38.8	I	Aftershock of the 6.5 event in September 25.	-	-
7	United States, Alaska offshore	6.8	19.6	IV	-	-	-
7	United States, Alaska offshore	6.2	33.0	III	Aftershock.	-	-
7	United States, Alaska offshore	6.1	33.0	I	Aftershock.	-	-
10	Turkey, Kayseri	4.2	10.0	V	Damage occurred in Kayseri.	-	-
10	Iran, Lorestan	4.5	33.0	IV	Damage occurred in Darb-e Astaneh.	-	-
13	Japan, Tokyo offshore	5.4	25.5	VI	Two people were injured.	-	2
15	Australia, Macquarie Island offshore	6.0	10.0	I	-	-	-
17	Papua New Guinea, East New Britain offshore	6.3	25.7	IV	-	-	-
17	United States, California	6.9	17.2	IX	1989 Loma Prieta earthquake: At least 63 people died and another 3,757 were injured. Major damage was caused in the San Francisco Bay Area, with many structures collapsing there. Also known as the World Series earthquake, it is the largest event to affect the area since 1906.	63	3,757
18	Solomon Islands, Makira	6.1	45.4	V	–	-	-
18	China, Shanxi	5.4	10.0	V	29 people were killed, 150 others were injured, and 27,500 houses were damaged in Datong and Yangyuan.	29	150
19	Kazakh Soviet Socialist Republic, East Kazakhstan	6.0	0.0	I	Nuclear explosion.	-	-
19	Italy, Lazio	3.8	10.0	VII	Slight damage occurred in the Alban Hills.	-	-
23	Tonga offshore, south of the Fiji Islands	6.1	441.4	I	-	-	-
26	Japan, Iwate offshore	6.2	8.0	II	These two earthquakes occurring a few hours apart can be considered a doublet earthquake.	-	-
27	Japan, Iwate offshore	6.4	9.1	II	These two earthquakes occurring a few hours apart can be considered a doublet earthquake.	-	-
27	Solomon Islands, Makira offshore	6.9	24.7	VIII	Minor landslides and ground fissures occurred in the village of Mwaninaro in Santa Catalina.	-	-
29	Japan, Iwate offshore	6.9	9.6	IV	Small tsunamis were observed, with heights of 11 cm. at Ofunato, 10 cm. at Ayukawa, 6 cm. at Miyako and 3 cm. at Hachinohe.	-	-
29	Algeria, Tipaza offshore	6.0	5.7	VIII	1989 Chenoua earthquake: 30 people were killed (the death toll could be as low as 22 or as high as 35), 245 were injured, and extensive damage was caused in Cherchell and Tipaza. 15,000 were left homeless.	30	245
29	Algeria, Tipaza offshore	5.6	10.0	VI	This aftershock of the 1989 Chenoua earthquake caused further damage and casualties in the Cherchell-Tifaza area.	-	-

=== November ===
November
- Strongest magnitude: 7.4 M_{w} Japan
- Deadliest: 5.2 M_{w} China; 4 deaths
- Total fatalities: 7

Number by magnitude
- 8.0–8.9: 0
- 7.0–7.9: 1
- 6.0–6.9: 11

Date	Country and location	M_{w}	Depth (km)	MMI	Notes	Casualties	
Date	Country and location	M_{w}	Depth (km)	MMI	Notes	Dead	Injured
1	Bolivia, Potosí	6.1	139.5	I	-	-	-
1	Japan, Iwate offshore	7.4	28.6	VI	Small tsunamis were observed, with heights of 56 cm. at Miyako, 34 cm. at Ayukawa, 24 cm. at Hachinohe and 20 cm. at Ofunato.	-	-
1	Japan, Iwate offshore	6.0	30.2	I	Aftershock.	-	-
3	Papua New Guinea, Admiralty Islands offshore	6.0	16.6	I	-	-	-
6	Solomon Islands, Makira offshore	6.1	39.2	V	-	-	-
16	Fiji, Eastern offshore	6.2	537.6	I	-	-	-
19	Papua New Guinea, Bougainville offshore	6.1	48.0	I	-	-	-
20	China, Chongqing	5.2	33.0	VI	Four people were killed, 161 were injured, and 1,000 houses were destroyed in Jiangbei County.	4	161
20	Iran, Kerman	5.9	18.4	VII	Three people were killed, 45 were injured, and damage occurred in Shahdad.	3	45
21	New Zealand, Auckland Islands offshore	6.3	26.7	I	-	-	-
25	Indonesia, Papua	6.1	25.8	V	-	-	-
29	Peru, Arequipa	6.3	70.8	IV	-	-	-
29	Tonga, south of the Fiji Islands offshore	6.1	487.0	I	-	-	-

=== December ===
December
- Strongest magnitude: 7.6 M_{w} Philippines
- Deadliest: 5.4 M_{w} Australia; 13 deaths
- Total fatalities: 14

Number by magnitude
- 8.0–8.9: 0
- 7.0–7.9: 2
- 6.0–6.9: 13

Date	Country and location	M_{w}	Depth (km)	MMI	Notes	Casualties	
Date	Country and location	M_{w}	Depth (km)	MMI	Notes	Dead	Injured
3	Peru, Ucayali	6.6	153.0	V	-	-	-
7	Iran, Sistan and Baluchestan province	6.0	15.6	VIII	-	-	-
7	Papua New Guinea, Morobe	7.1	104.4	VII	-	-	-
9	Indonesia, Gorontalo offshore	6.7	151.0	V	-	-	-
15	Philippines, Caraga offshore	7.6	24.4	VII	Two people were killed and many others were injured in Mindanao.	2	Many
20	Spain, Isla Cristina	5.3	14.0	V	Minor damage in the Santa Cristina area.	-	-
27	Australia, New South Wales	5.4	10.0	VIII	The 1989 Newcastle earthquake was one of Australia's most serious natural disasters, killing 13 people and injuring more than 160, despite its moderate magnitude.	13	160
