= Željne =

Slovenian village

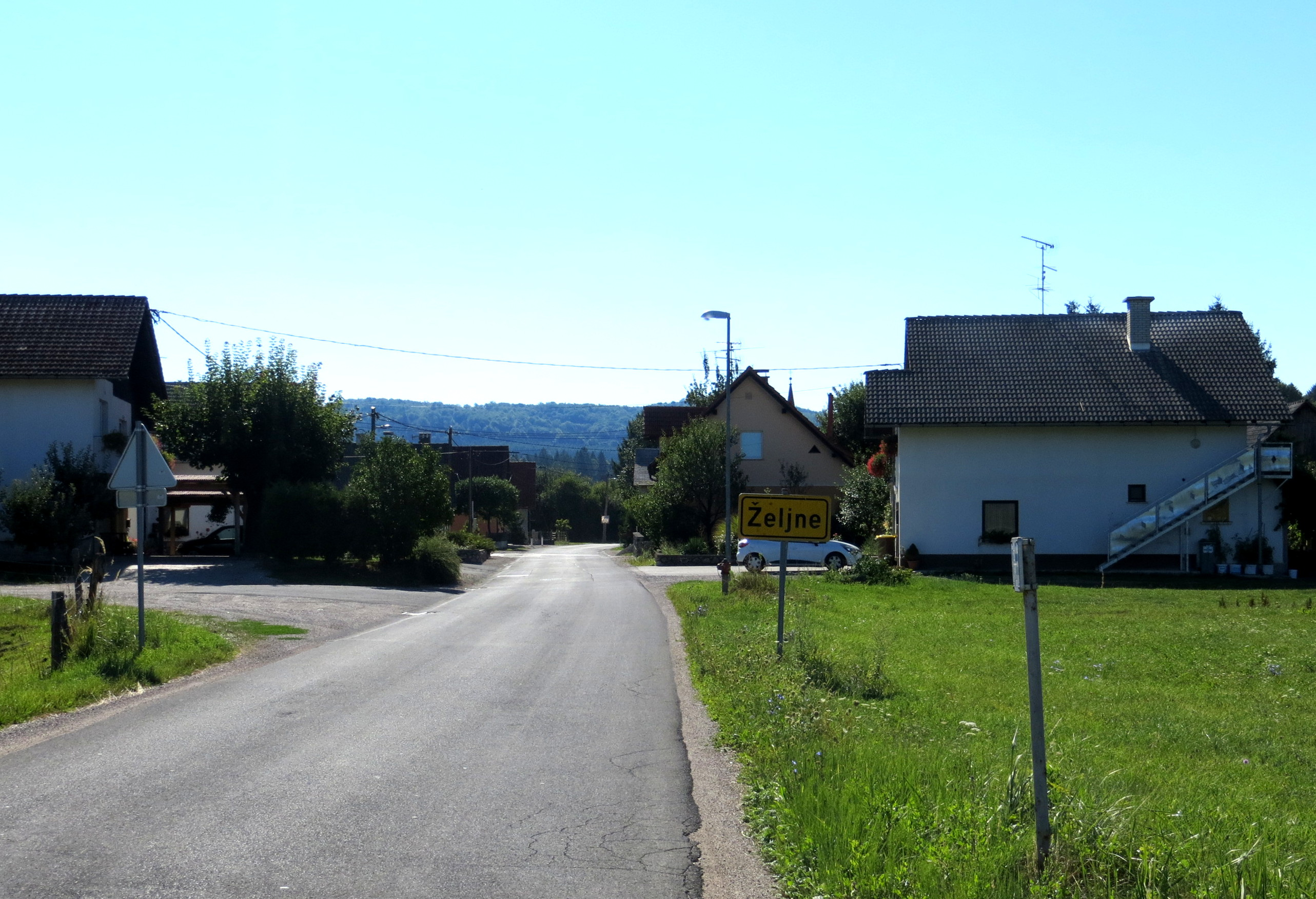

- Location in Slovenia
- Coordinates: 45°39′18.83″N 14°53′24.99″E
- Country: Slovenia
- Traditional region: Lower Carniola
- Statistical region: Southeast Slovenia
- Municipality: Kočevje

Area
  - Total: 7.42 km^{2} (2.86 sq mi)
- Elevation: 467.9 m (1,535 ft)

Population (2002)
  - Total: 498
- Postal code: 1330

Željne (pronounced [ˈʒɛːlnɛ]; in older sources also Sela, German: Seele or Selle) is a village northeast of the town of Kočevje in southern Slovenia. The area is part of the traditional region of Lower Carniola and is now included in the Southeast Slovenia Statistical Region.

== Geography ==
Željne is a ribbon village on a gently undulating plain along the road from Klinja Vas to Kočevje Rog. Kobl Hill stands south of the village. The soil is loamy and fertile. Željne Caves (Željnske jame) are located south of the village, from which Zeljne Creek (Želijnske potok) flows east. In the past, the caves were used as shelter during Ottoman incursions.

== Name ==
Željne was attested in written sources in 1763–87 as Sella. The name is ultimately derived from Slovene *Sela (literally 'villages', referring to multiple hamlets in the settlement). This name was borrowed into Gottschee German as Seele, and the modern Slovene name Željne was then re-borrowed from the German dative plural form in Seelen 'in Željne'.

== Church ==
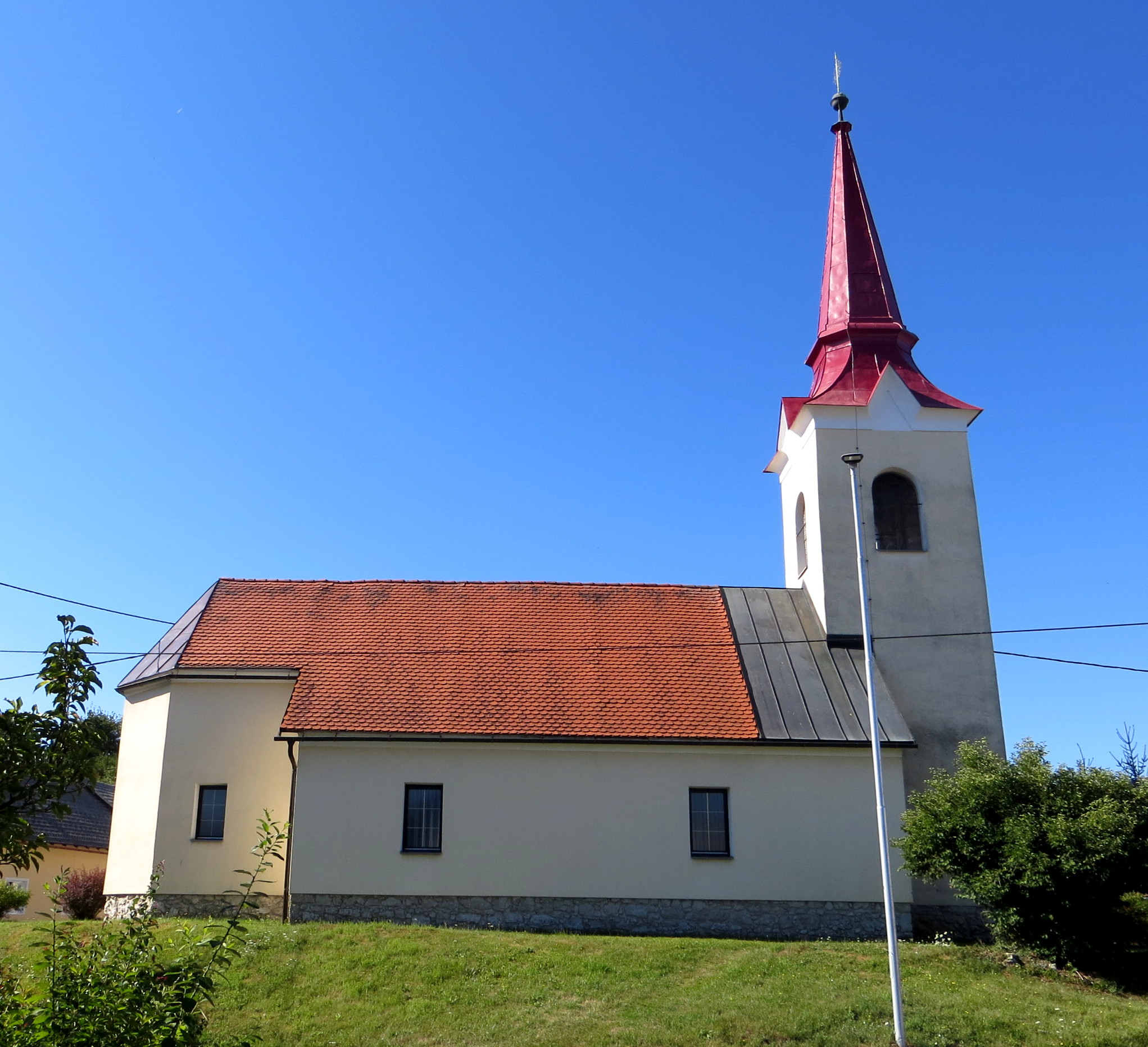
Saint Lawrence's Church

The local church is dedicated to Saint Lawrence and belongs to the Parish of Kočevje. It was a 16th-century building, rebuilt after it was damaged by fire in 1888.
