= Bartang (disambiguation) =

Bartang may refer to:

- Bartang, a river in Tajikistan and Afghanistan
- Bartang Valley in Gorno-Badakhshan Autonomous Province
- Bartang (jamoat) one of the jamoats of Tajikistan
