= 2015 Tajikistan earthquake =

Earthquake in Tajikistan

- Location within Tajikistan
- UTC time: 2015-12-07 07:50:05
- ISC event: 608081959
- USGS-ANSS: ComCat
- Local date: 7 December 2015
- Local time: 12:50 TJT (UTC+5)
- Magnitude: 7.2 M_{w} 7.4 M_{s}^{(CEIC)}
- Depth: 26 km (16 mi)
- Epicenter: 38.258°N 72.767°E
- Areas affected: Tajikistan, Xinjiang in China, India, Pakistan, Afghanistan, Kyrgyzstan
- Total damage: 500 homes destroyed
- Max. intensity: MMI VII (Very strong)
- Casualties: 2 killed and dozens injured

On 7 December 2015, an earthquake measuring 7.2 on the moment magnitude scale struck Tajikistan 105 km (65 mi) west of Murghab at 07:50 UTC at a depth of 26.0 km (16.2 mi). The earthquake was also felt in neighboring Xinjiang in China, India, Afghanistan, Pakistan and Kyrgyzstan.

The earthquake was felt with intensities of MMI IV in Islamabad, Pakistan, MMI IV in New Delhi, India, MMI IV in Kashgar, China, MMI II in Dushanbe, Tajikistan, MMI II in Kabul, Afghanistan, MMI III in Tashkent, Uzbekistan, MMI III in Bishkek, Kyrgyzstan, and MMI II in Almaty, Kazakhstan.

A truck driver and a policeman were killed while dozens more were injured and 500 homes destroyed.

The epicentre of this quake was approximately 5.0 km (3.1 mi) distant from the epicentre of the M7.3 1911 Sarez earthquake which formed the Usoi Dam across the Murghab river.

== Tectonic setting ==
The eastern part of Tajikistan (the Pamir Mountains) lies within the complex zone of collision between the Indian plate and the Eurasian plate. The dominant structures in this area are a combination of thrust faults and sinistral (left lateral) strike-slip faults. The Sarez–Karakul fault zone is a major SW–NE trending sinistral strike-slip fault that extends from south of Sarez Lake to north of Karakul lake. The 1911 earthquake is thought to have been caused by movement on this structure.

== Earthquake ==
Based on observations of ground rupture from SAR interferometry, the earthquake ruptured a 79 km section of the Sarez–Karakul fault zone. This is consistent with the observed distribution of aftershocks and the focal mechanism. Three separate segments were involved, consisting of two longer SW–NE trending segments linked by a shorter more WSW–ENE trending patch forming a restraining bend. The hypocenter is located within the southwesternmost segment. The earthquake's detailed rupture history has been determined using a backprojection method using teleseismic data from stations in the European seismic network. Analysis has shown that the rupture propagated to the northeast initially at speeds below the S wave velocity (subshear), but jumping to supershear speeds. At the restraining bend it slowed to subshear speeds before accelerating again to supershear speeds on the third segment.

== See also ==
- List of earthquakes in 2015
- List of earthquakes in Tajikistan
