= Bartang =

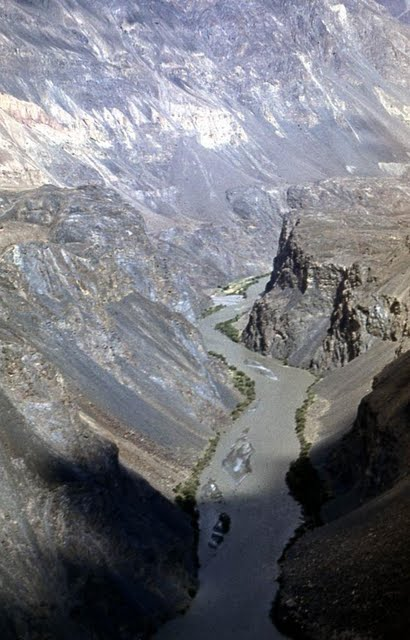
- Bartang river, a view from the air

Location
- Country: Afghanistan, Tajikistan

Physical characteristics
- Mouth: Panj
  - coordinates: 37.9185°N 71.5919°E
- Length: 528 km (328 mi)
- Basin size: 24,700 km^{2} (9,500 sq mi)

Basin features
- Progression: Panj→ Amu Darya→ Aral Sea

The Bartang (Russian and Tajik: Бартанг, Persian: برتنگ) is a river of Central Asia, and is a tributary to the Panj which itself is a tributary to the Amu Darya. In its middle and upper reaches, it is respectively known as the Murghab and Aksu; it flows through the Wakhan District of Badakhshan Province in Afghanistan, then through the Rushon District of the Gorno-Badakhshan autonomous region, Tajikistan. The river is 528 km (328 mi) long (133 km (83 mi) excluding Aksu and Murghab) and has a basin area of 24,700 km^{2} (9,500 mi^{2}).

== Course ==
The river rises from Chaqmaqtin Lake, which is located near Bazai Gumbad in the Wakhan District of Afghanistan, where it is known as the Aksu or Oksu ("white water"). It then flows east and crosses into Tajikistan, then turns north to the city of Murghab passing the village of Shaimak.

Below the city of Murghab the river is called the Murghab (Tajik: Мурғоб, Persian: مرغاب Murghob meaning "Bird River", Russian: Мургаб - Murgab). A few kilometres below Murghab is Sarez Lake, formed by a landslide during the 1911 Sarez earthquake, which created the world's highest natural dam, Usoi Dam.

The river is joined by the Ghudara river just below Sarez Lake. From the junction the river is known as the Bartang. The Bartang traces a route down the western Pamir Mountains, flowing 132 km (82 mi) before becoming a tributary to the Panj at the Afghanistan–Tajikistan border. Much of the river lies within the boundaries of the Tajik National Park. The Bartang is fed mostly by glacier and snow melt. It is the only river to cross Gorno-Badakhshan from east to west.

The Bartang-Murghab-Aksu crosses Gorno-Badikhstan from east to west

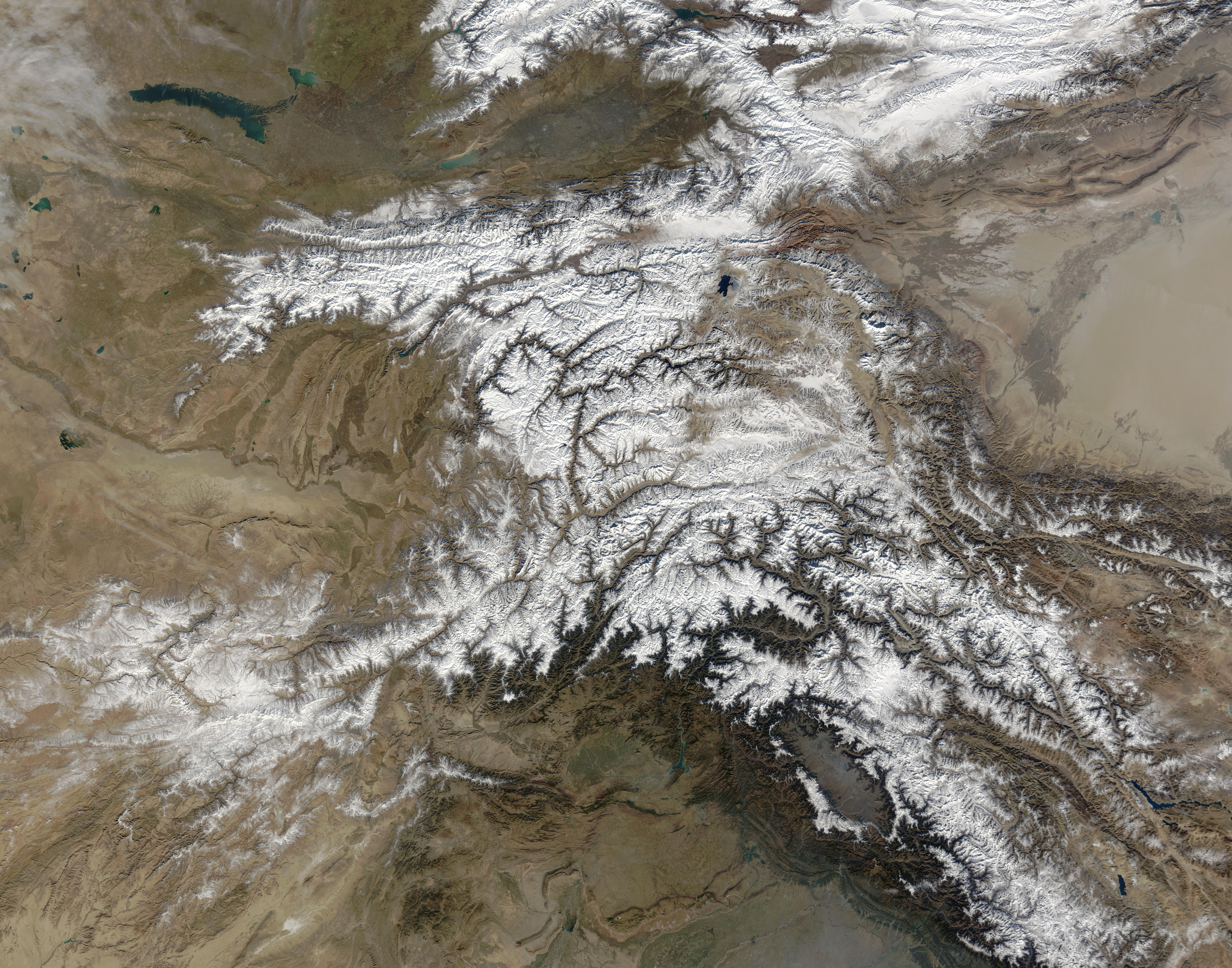
The Bartang from space

The Bartang enters the Panj just upstream from the town of Rushon.

== Access ==
'Bartang' means 'narrow passage' in Persian language. Before the 20th century travel required fords, ladders and platforms set into the sides of cliffs. There were three paths, one along the river, usable only in autumn when the water was low, the second along the cliffs and the third, much longer, where pack animals could be led along the mountain ridges. The modern road can become impassable beyond Basid due to rockslides. Above Basid is the large village of Roshov. Above that the Ghudara River and the Murghab Rivers join to form the Bartang. The road follows the Ghudata northeast to its junction with the Tanimas which leads west to the Fedchenko Glacier. A road of sorts continues east to lake Karakul.

The Murghab is generally not passable except as an adventure. There is a dirt road for the last 37 km (23 mi) to Murghab town. Above Murghab a jeep road, of decreasing quality, follows the river southeast to Tokhtamish and Shaimak.

== Sarez Lake ==
On 18 February 1911, the 1911 Sarez earthquake, estimated at 7.4 on the Richter magnitude scale, caused a large landslide which completely blocked the flow of the Murghab and buried a local village. The landslide, estimated at two cubic kilometers of rock, formed a natural dam called the Usoi Dam. Over the following months the Murghab filled the space behind the Usoi to form Sarez Lake, which now fills about 60 kilometers in length of the Murghab river valley and contains 17 cubic kilometers of water. Geologists believe that the dam may be unstable and could collapse during a future strong earthquake, either from structural failure of the earthen dam itself or liquefaction of the soil & rock debris making up the dam. The Usoi Dam wall survived a localised 7.2 magnitude earthquake, the 2015 Tajikistan earthquake, on 7 December 2015 with no visible signs of deterioration.

== See also ==
- List of rivers of Afghanistan
- List of rivers of Tajikistan
