= Tajik National Park =

National park in Tajikistan

Tajik National Park (Mountains of the Pamirs)
UNESCO World Heritage Site
- Location within Tajikistan Location within West and Central Asia
- Location: Tajikistan
- Criteria: Natural:
- Reference: 1252rev
- Inscription: 2013 (37th Session)
- Area: 26,116.74 km^{2} (10,083.73 sq mi)
- Coordinates: 38°45′54″N 72°18′19″E

Tajik National Park (Tajik: Боғи миллии Тоҷикистон, romanized: Boghi millii Tojikiston; Russian: Таджикский национальный парк, romanized: Tadzhikskiy natsional'nyy park) is a national park and nature reserve in eastern Tajikistan. It was established in 1992 and expanded in 2001 to include parts of the Pamir Mountains, the third-highest mountain system in the world. The park covers 26,116.74 square kilometres (10,083.73 sq mi) or a little over 18 percent of Tajikistan's total area.

== History ==
From 1989 to 1992, Anvar J. Buzurukov (as the head of the Protected Areas Department of the Ministry of the Environment) initiated, planned and led (under the international scientific camp "Pamir-90") scientific feasibility studies towards establishing the first national and natural parks in the Tajik Soviet Socialist Republic. An area of 12,000 square kilometres (4,600 sq mi) was designated Tajik National Park by Decision No. 267 of the Tajikistan government on 20 July 1992. A year before the same team established the first nature reserve in Tajikistan, Shirkent Nature Park.

In 2001, the area of Tajik National Park was increased to 26,116.74 square kilometres (10,083.73 sq mi) by the Order of the Government of the Republic of Tajikistan No. 253.

== Ecology and wildlife ==
The national park features a mix of steppe, desert, grassland and alpine regions. It has long cold winters and cool summers, with an average annual rainfall of 12.7 cm.

Species known to live in the national park include the brown bear, snow leopard, wolves, markhor, Marco Polo sheep, brown-headed gulls and bar-headed geese.

It is also part of the Fedchenko Glacier, the largest valley glacier in Eurasia and world's longest outside the polar regions; Uzoi Dam, the highest natural dam in the world; and Karakul Lake, the world's highest large lake created by a meteor.

== World Heritage status ==
In 2008, the national park was submitted to UNESCO with a view to becoming a World Heritage Site. In 2013, the park was accepted as World Heritage.

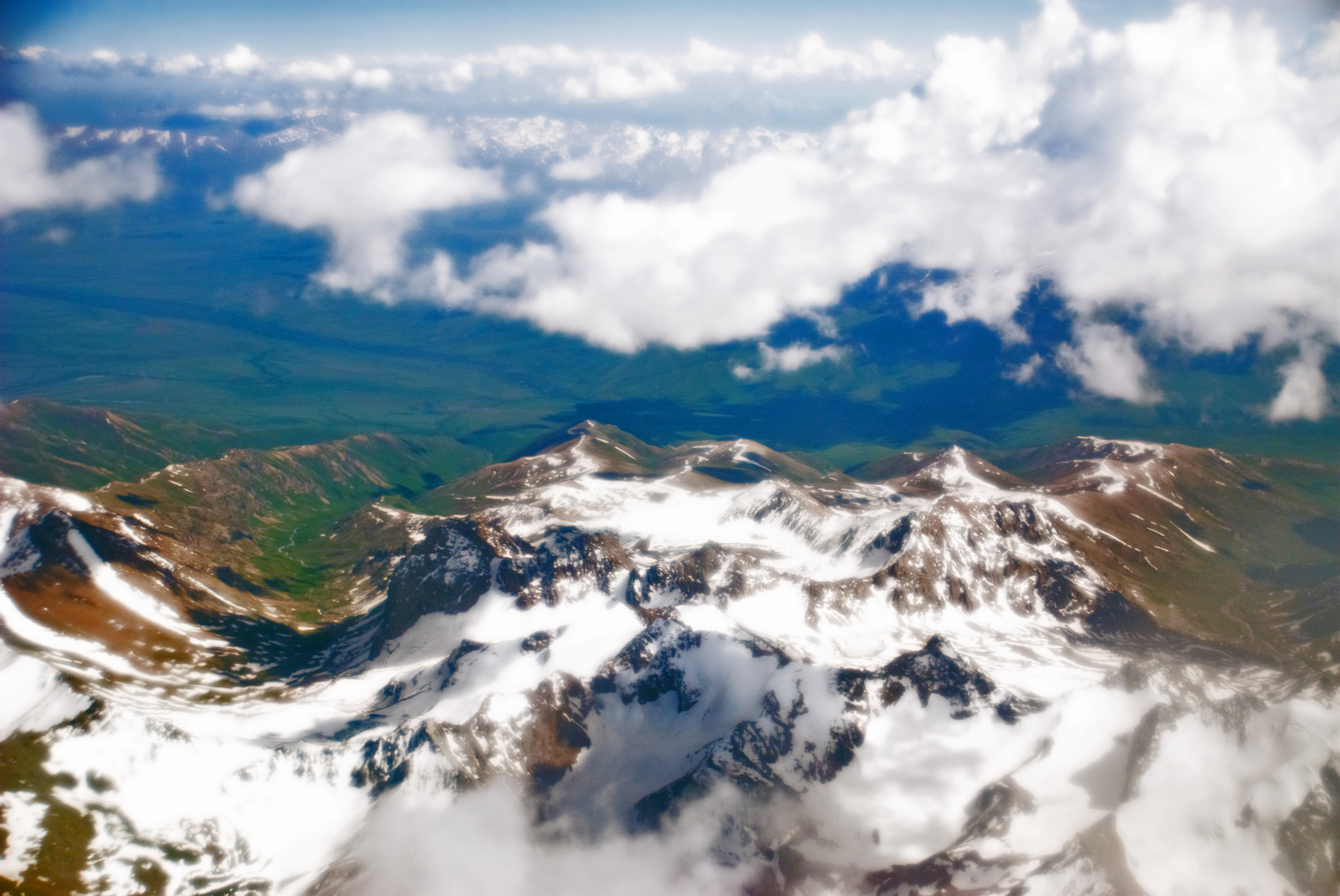
The Pamir Mountains

Map of eastern Tajikistan and the Pamir Ranges, showing Tajik National Park outlined in green
