= 2006 Tajikistan earthquake =

- Location within Tajikistan
- UTC time: Doublet earthquake:
- A: 2006-07-29 00:11:51
- B: 2006-07-29 10:57:15
- ISC event
- A: 10699645
- B: 10699655
- USGS-ANSS
- A: ComCat
- B: ComCat
- Local date: July 29, 2006
- Magnitude
- A: 5.6 M_{w}
- B: 5.4 M_{w}
- Depth: 34 km (21 mi); 10 km (6.2 mi)
- Epicenter: 37.26°N 68.83°E
- Type: Reverse
- Areas affected: Tajikistan
- Total damage: $22 million
- Max. intensity: MMI VII (Very strong)
- Casualties: 3 killed and 19 injured

On July 29, the 2006 Tajikistan earthquake hit the Khatlon region of Tajikistan. The earthquake doublet killed four people and injured 40 in both Tajikistan and Afghanistan.

== Damage and casualties ==
=== Tajikistan ===
Three people, all of them children, were killed when walls collapsed on them. Nineteen others were injured, six of whom were later evacuated to the neighbouring district of Kolhozabad. At least 1,083 homes were destroyed, and 1,500 others were damaged in the worst‑hit districts of Panj and Qumsangir, close to the border with Afghanistan. In addition, nine schools, four health centres, a hospital, four transformers, 2 km (1.2 mi) of electrical lines, a pumping station, a college building, a rest home, four shops, and 20 other buildings were affected. More than 9,000 people were left homeless.

=== Afghanistan ===
In Kunduz Province, an elderly woman was killed, 21 others were injured, and more than 50 residential houses were destroyed.

== Responses ==
Poor water and sanitation posed an ongoing risk to health, as did malaria, given its prevalence in the region and the fact that some people sleep outdoors without mosquito nets. Damaged roofs made from asbestos posed additional health risks.

Following an initial assessment mission to the earthquake‑affected areas on 29 July, led by the Minister for Emergency Situations, a second joint mission followed on 1 August, led by the Deputy Prime Minister and including the UN Country Team, WHO, and humanitarian partners. WHO, in collaboration with the Ministry of Health, immediately activated other UN and international agencies and NGOs in response to the disaster.

To date, more than ten health partners, including NGOs, UN, and international agencies, have worked together to provide 50,000 water purification tablets, 86 tents, essential household items, mosquito nets, soap, buckets, and high‑energy biscuits, and to ensure basic drugs are available. WHO has donated one NEHKit to support local health authorities in ensuring that essential medications are available for affected communities and has forwarded drug donation guidelines.

Funding has been received from ECHO since January 2006 in support of WHO's work to 'strengthen and enhance the coordination of humanitarian health programmes' in Tajikistan.

== See also ==
- List of earthquakes in 2006
- List of earthquakes in Tajikistan
