= Rushon =

Rushon Vamar
- Location in Tajikistan
- Coordinates: 37°56′39″N 71°33′27″E
- Country: Tajikistan
- Region: Gorno-Badakhshan Autonomous Region
- District: Rushon District
- Established: 1932
- Elevation: 2,000 m (6,600 ft)

Population (2015)
  - Total: 6,577
- Official languages: Russian (Interethnic); Tajik (State) (Note: Constitution of Tajikistan)

Rushon (Tajik: Рӯшон, Russian: Рушан, romanized: Rushan, Persian: روشان, Pamiri: Ręxon) is a town and the seat of Rushon District of Gorno-Badakhshan Autonomous Region in southeastern Tajikistan. The town with aglomeration has a total population of 6,577 (2015).

== Geography ==
Locally known as Vamar (Persian: وامر, Pamiri: Vamár) it is a town located in the Rushon District on the border with Afghanistan 65 kilometres (40 mi) north of Khorugh.

It was known as Kala-i Vamar (the fortress of Vamar) until 1932.

The town is located on the river Panj just downstream from the mouth of the Bartang at the point where the Panj briefly turns west before resuming its northerly course. It is at this point that the Vamardaya creek cascades from a steep V shaped gorge in the mountains behind the town, into Panj River.

There is a small museum and the ruins of a Kala-i Vamar (Vamardiž) a mediaeval era fort.

== Services ==
Rushan has a small commercial precinct that runs down the main road, centred on the bazaar.

Fuel can be obtained from two outlets on the edge of the town and there is a school housed in a purpose built three storey structure on the south side of the AH66 highway and like many towns in the district streets tend to be lined with poplar trees. Soccer fields lie at the eastern end of the town.

There are multiple guesthouses in the town.

The Aghan border lies at the southern edge of the town.

The nearby village of Bomak, located at the mouth of the Bartangi rive has fuel, a school and retail services as well. This village is known for the lonely boulder and the white bridge over the bartangi.

There is also a small airfield in Vamar, however, there has been no flights in recent history.

== History ==
It is believed that the fort Kalai-Vamar was built by local people in defence of the Chinese advancement to Pamirs.

During the Middle Ages, Rushon was a semi-independent emirate. One of many that formed in the remote mountains following the collapse of the Mongolian empire.

Many times Kalai-Vamar fell to Shahs of Darwaz and Shughnan, remaining under control of Shughnan until Afghans of Badakhshan took it on the last quarter of 19th century.

In 1885 Russians liberated Pamiri kingdoms of Panj right bank but soon gave them to Manghit Emirate of Bukhara where they resided until the October Revolution. During Soviet Era the Castle of Vamar was destroyed and its territory mainly demolished giving way to military base facilities.

On the morning of May 18, 2022, Rushon was the scene of a violent crackdown on protesters by security forces with several casualties. Local residents had been blocking the road to Khorugh, where protests against human rights violations were ongoing, in order to prevent a military convoy from passing.
