= Sarez Lake =

Lake in Gorno-Badakhshan, Tajikistan

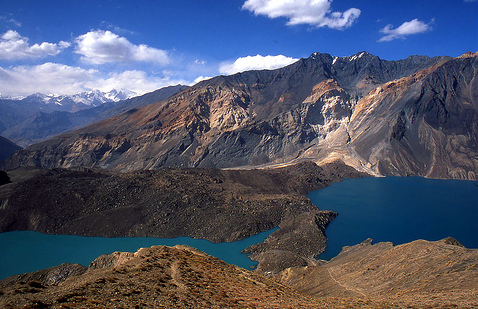
- Usoi Dam separating Sarez (right) and Shadau (left) lakes

- Location within Tajikistan
- Interactive map of Sarez Lake
- Coordinates: 38°12′06″N 72°45′27″E
- Primary inflows: Murghab River
- Primary outflows: Murghab River
- Basin countries: Tajikistan
- Max. length: 75.8 kilometres (47.1 mi)
- Max. width: 3.3 kilometres (2.1 mi)
- Surface area: 79.7 square kilometres (30.8 sq mi)
- Average depth: 201.8 metres (662 ft)
- Max. depth: 505 metres (1,657 ft)
- Water volume: 16.074 cubic kilometres (3.856 cu mi)
- Shore length^{1}: 162 kilometres (101 mi)
- Surface elevation: 3,263 metres (10,705 ft)
- ^{1} Shore length is not a well-defined measure.

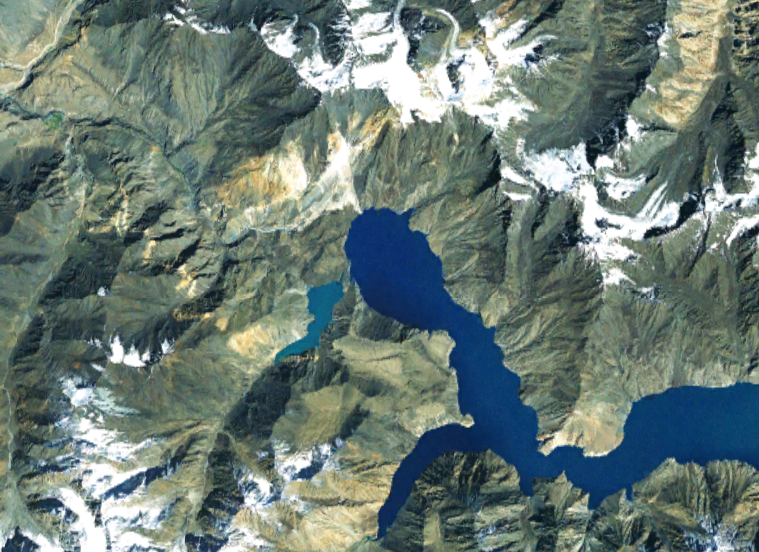
Satellite photo of the western end of Sarez Lake showing the Usoi Dam and the smaller Shadau Lake

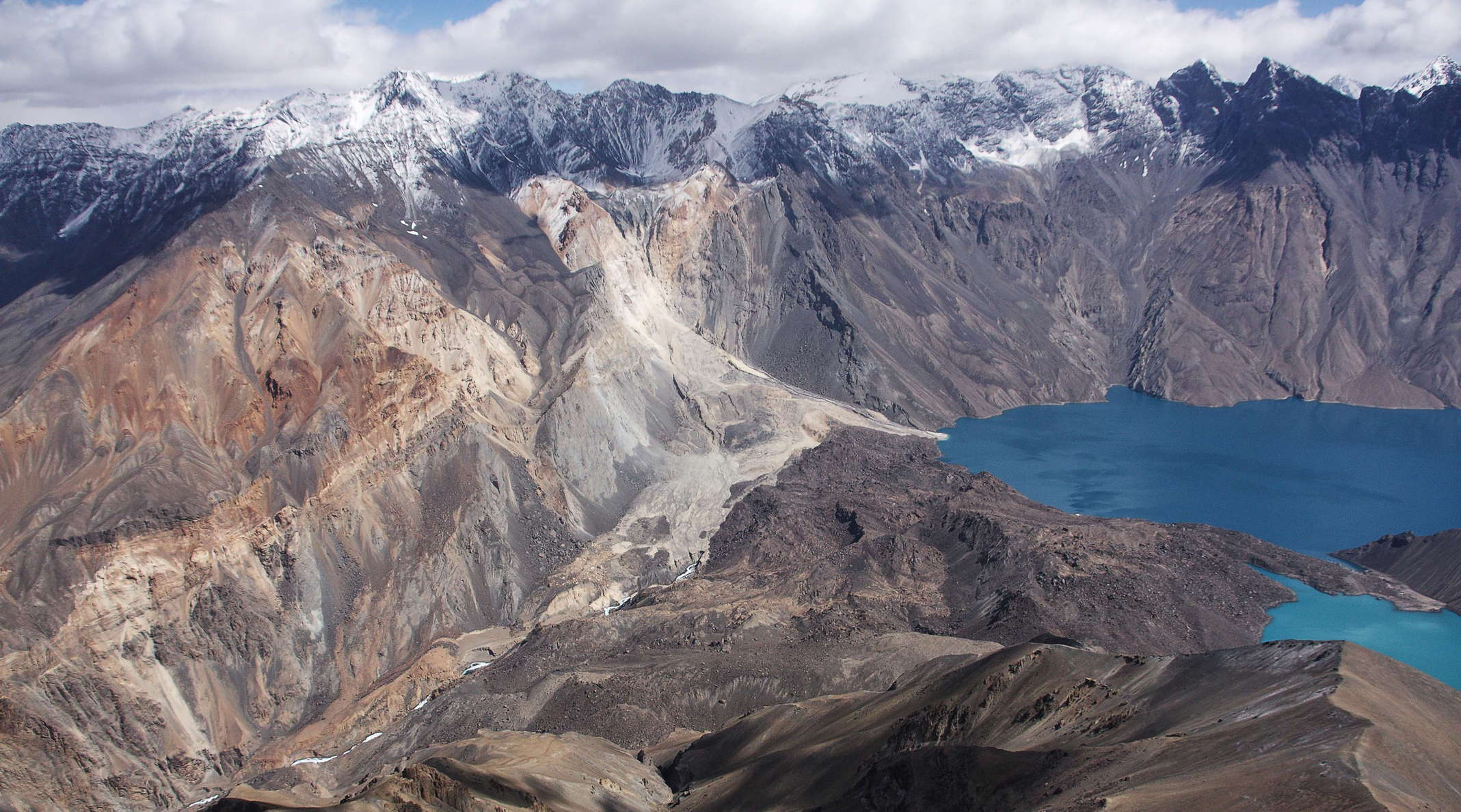
Usoi Dam, showing the outflow of Sarez Lake in the bottom left.

Sarez Lake (/səˈrɛz/ sə-REZ) (Note: Tajik: Сарез кӯл, romanized: Sarez ko‘l, IPA: [sɐˈɾes‿kʰɵl]; Russian: Сарезское озеро, romanized: Sarezskoye ozero, IPA: [sɐˈrʲesːkəje ˈozʲɪrə]) is a lake in Rushon District of Gorno-Badakhshan province, Tajikistan. Its length is about 75.8 kilometres (47.1 mi), its depth about a few hundred meters, its water surface elevation about 3,263 metres (10,705 ft) above sea level, and volume of water over 16 cubic kilometres (3.8 cu mi). The mountains around it rise over 2,300 metres (7,500 ft) above the lake level.

The lake formed in 1911, after a great earthquake, when the Murghab River was blocked by a big landslide. Scientists believe that the landslide dam formed by the earthquake, known as the Usoi Dam, is unstable given local seismicity, and that the terrain below the lake is in danger of catastrophic flood if the dam were to fail during a future earthquake. The Usoi Dam wall survived a localised 7.2 magnitude earthquake, the 2015 Tajikistan earthquake, on 7 December 2015 with no visible signs of deterioration.

Shadau Lake is a small water body southwest of the Usoi Dam and west of Sarez Lake.

== Formation ==
The formation of Sarez Lake is described in the book by Middleton and Thomas:

The 1911 Sarez earthquake, estimated at 6.5-7.0 on the Richter scale, occurred about midnight, 5–6 February 1911 (old style). Deaths were estimated at 302. The landslide was 2.2 billion cubic meters and formed the Usoi Dam which is approx. 5 kilometres (3.1 mi) long, 3.2 kilometres (2.0 mi) wide and up to 567 metres (1,860 ft) high, the tallest natural dam in the world. Usoi was a village buried under the landslide. The area was so isolated and the destruction of mountain tracks so complete that it took six weeks before word reached the Russian posts at Murghab and Khorog.

In 1968 a landslide caused two-meter-high waves in the lake. A 1997 conference in Dushanbe concluded that the dam was unstable and might collapse if there were another powerful earthquake. A 2004 study by the World Bank held that the dam was stable. The principal danger seems to be a partially detached mass of rock of about 3 cubic kilometres that could break loose and fall into the lake. Since the valley below the dam is so narrow, any flood would be very destructive. The result of a global risk analysis carried out by STUCKY for the World Bank was presented at the 2002 IAHR Symposium in St Petersburg and at the 2006 International Congress on Large Dams in Barcelona.
