= 1989 Irian Jaya earthquake =

Earthquake affecting Indonesia

- Location within Western New Guinea Location within Indonesia
- UTC time: 1989-08-01 00:18:04
- ISC event: 393850
- USGS-ANSS: ComCat
- Local date: August 1, 1989
- Local time: 9:18 WITA
- Magnitude: 6.0 M_{w}
- Epicenter: 4.511°S 139.022°E
- Type: Dip-slip
- Areas affected: Indonesia
- Max. intensity: MMI VIII (Severe)
- Casualties: 120 dead 120 injured

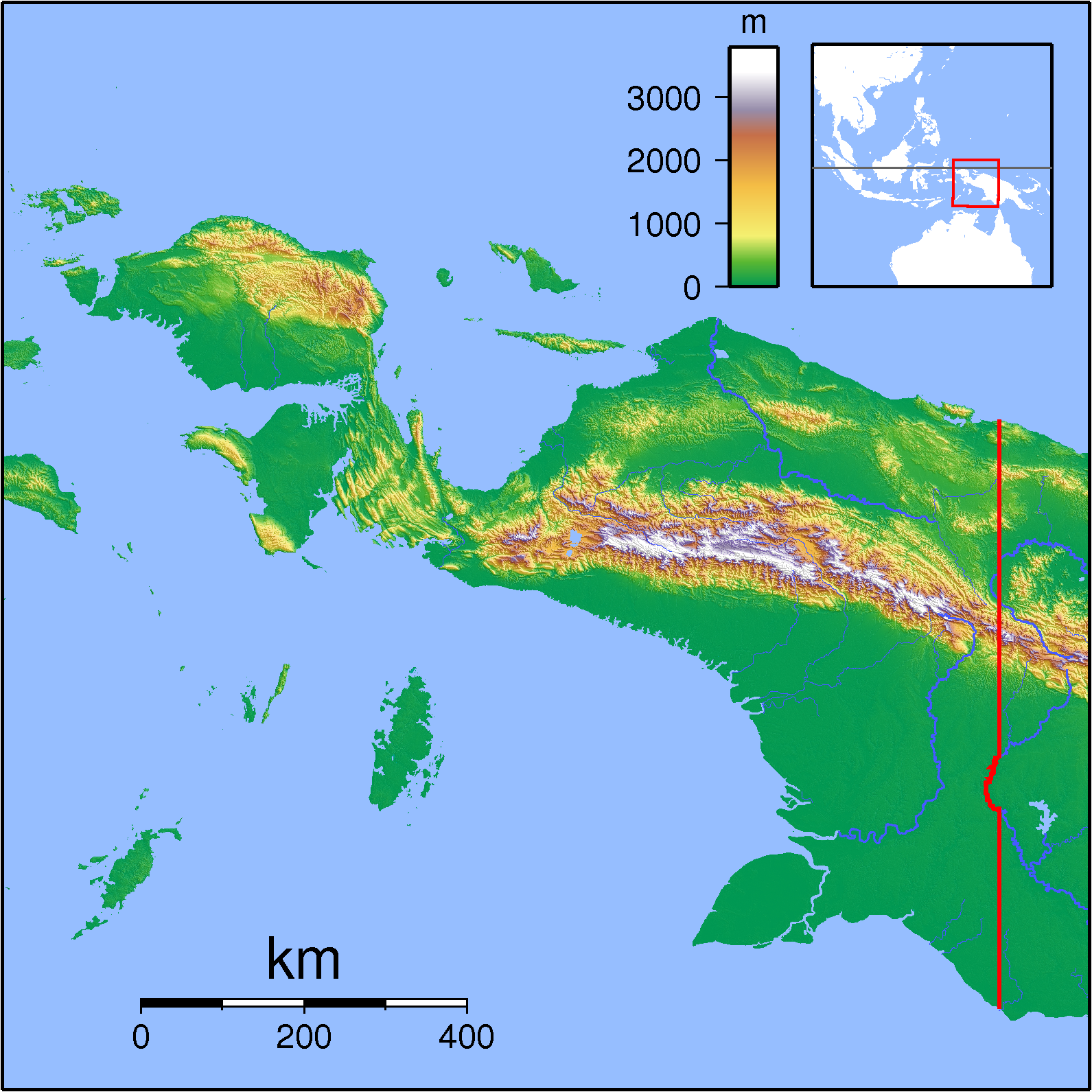
Topographic locator map for Papua (Indonesian part of New Guinea). Created with GMT from SRTM data. Left: 130, Bottom: -10, Right: 142, Top: 2

The 1989 Irian Jaya earthquake struck Kurima District, Yahukimo Regency, Highland Papua, Indonesia – then Irian Jaya province – on August 1 with a moment magnitude of 6.0 and a maximum Mercalli intensity of VIII (Severe). Around 120 people were killed, mainly due to landslides and mudslides.

== Details and relief ==
The earthquake struck at 9:17 local time and measured M_{s} 5.7 and 6.0 on the moment magnitude scale. Its epicenter was located 299 km (186 mi) south of Jayapura; the earthquake reached Wamena. There were multiple aftershocks.

The earthquake killed 120 people and left 120 injured; all of the dead were recovered from the villages of Holuon, Pasema, and Soba. Many of these deaths and injuries derived from landslides that covered two villages and disrupted sections of the Baliem River, practically flooding three villages and depositing tons of mud. One of these landslides was 200 m (660 ft) tall; there were eleven in total. A large portion of the dead consisted of Dhani tribesmen.

Local authorities distributed food, blankets, clothing, and money to survivors. Helicopters supplied food and other relief supplies, but they were slowed by cracks in the local airstrips. More than 25 survivors were treated for severe injuries and another 100 for less grave maladies. Between 200 and 300 people were evacuated in the aftermath of the tremor, and 3,500 Hupla people were resettled at a lower altitude, thus moving them from their traditional settlements.

== Geology ==
The focal mechanism for the earthquake demonstrated reverse faulting. The region around the epicenter has a history of powerful earthquakes. Between two earthquakes in 1976 and 1981, 1000 people died. There have been large earthquakes in the region as recently as 2009 and 2010.

== See also ==
- List of earthquakes in 1989
- List of earthquakes in Indonesia
