= 1989 Gissar earthquake =

Earthquake in Tajikistan

- Location within Tajikistan
- UTC time: 1989-01-22 23:02:07
- ISC event: 416139
- USGS-ANSS: ComCat
- Local date: January 23, 1989
- Local time: 05:02:07
- Magnitude: 5.3 mb
- Depth: 33 km (21 mi)
- Epicenter: 38.47°N 68.69°E
- Areas affected: Tajikistan
- Total damage: $24 million
- Max. intensity: MMI VII (Very strong)
- Casualties: 274 dead Many injured

The 1989 Gissar earthquake occurred at 23:02 UTC on 22 January near Gissar in Tajikistan. The shock had a body wave magnitude of 5.3 and a maximum felt intensity of VII (Very strong) on the Mercalli intensity scale. The National Geophysical Data Center reported that the death toll from the event amounted to about 274, and the National Earthquake Information Center stated there were many injured. Nearly all the casualties were caused by mudslides which buried Sharora and two nearby villages. The earthquake was the deadliest in 1989.

== See also ==
- List of earthquakes in Tajikistan
