= Geology of Tajikistan =

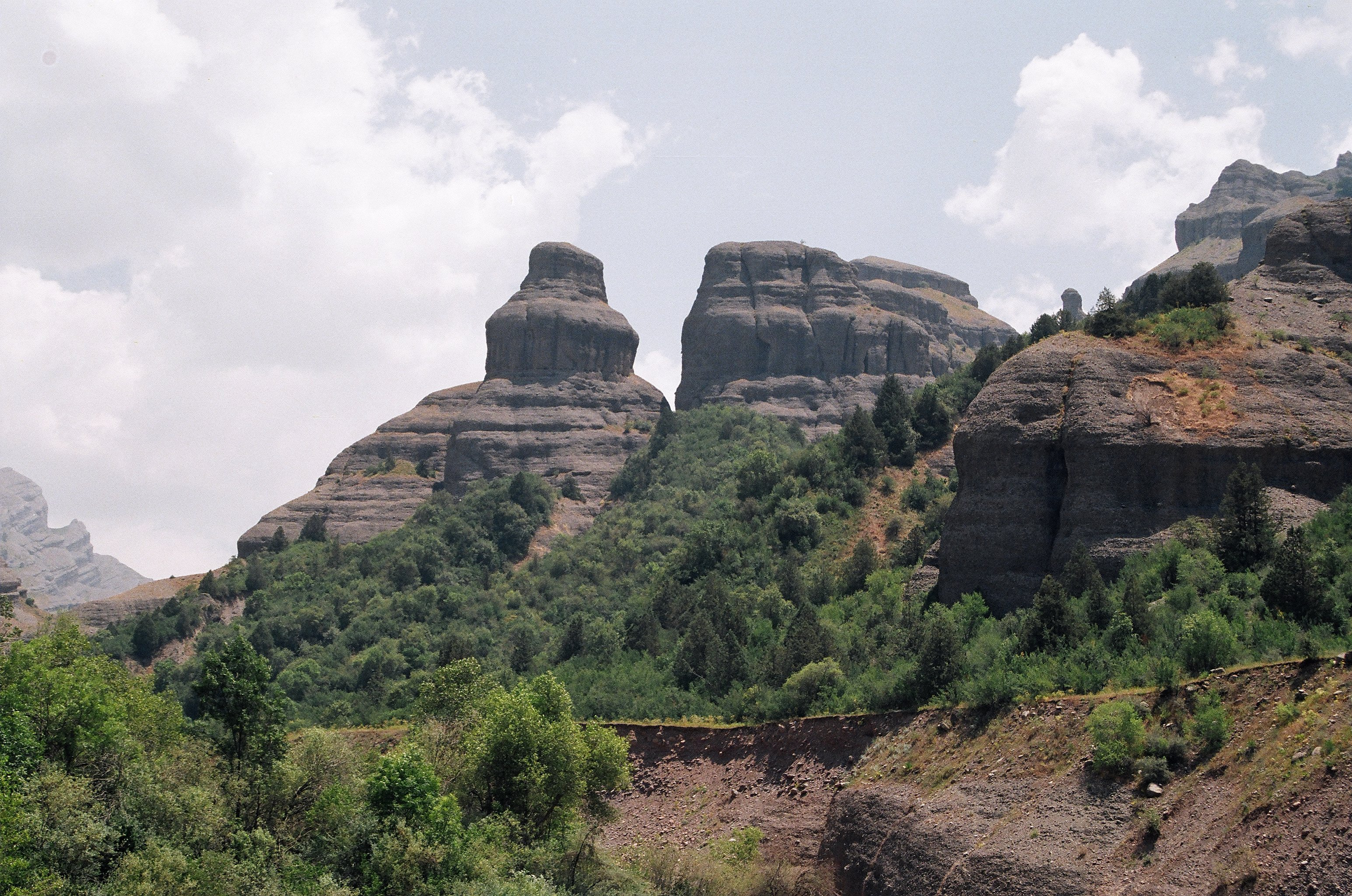
Outcrop of rock in Tajikistan

The geology of Tajikistan encompasses a nearly 90 percent mountainous landscape. The Tajik Depression in the west is the only lowland in the entire country. The Trans-Altai Mountains are a continuation of the Tien Shan Mountains into the east. By contrast, the Pamir Mountains are a high-altitude plateau region more than six kilometers above sea level, extending 400 kilometers by 225 kilometers. The Pamir Mountains are tectonic belts, joined by suture features and trending from Paleozoic age rocks in the north to Cenozoic age rocks in the south.

The Tajik Depression holds sedimentary rocks up to six kilometers thick, including 700 meters of Jurassic salt, overlain by one kilometer thick Cretaceous quartzose sediments and a two kilometer sequence of Cretaceous to Oligocene carbonates, evaporites and shales. Fold and thrusts have deformed all the Tajik Depression rocks above the Jurassic salts. Tajikistan is highly seismically active, due to continued uplift, deformation and the underthrusting of the Eurasian continental crust 300 kilometers beneath the Pamir Mountains.
