= Rushon District =

Rushon District Russian: Рушанский район Tajik: Ноҳияи Рӯшон
- District
- Location of Rushon District in Tajikistan
- Coordinates: 38°00′N 72°05′E
- Country: Tajikistan
- Region: Gorno-Badakhshan Autonomous Region
- Capital: Rushon

Area
  - Total: 5,870.7 km^{2} (2,266.7 sq mi)

Population (2020)
  - Total: 25,800
  - Density: 4.39/km^{2} (11.4/sq mi)
- Time zone: UTC+5 (TJT)
- Postal code: 736200
- Area code: +992 3556
- Official languages: Russian (Interethnic); Tajik (State)
- Website: rushon.tj

Rushon District (Note: Russian: Рушанский район, romanized: Rušanskij raion, IPA: [rʊˈʂanskʲɪj rɐˈjɵn]; Tajik: Ноҳияи Рӯшон, romanized: Nohiyayi Ro‘shon, IPA: [nɔhɪˈjaɪ rɵˈʃɔn]) is a district in east Tajikistan, in the west-central part of the Gorno-Badakhshan Autonomous Region (GBAO). It stretches along the river Bartang between the Yazgulem Range to the north and the Rushon Range to the south. Its capital is Rushon, also known as Vomar (pronounced: vamar), situated on the border with Afghanistan, 65 km north of Khorugh (the capital of GBAO) along the river Panj and the Pamir Highway. The population of Rushon district is 25,800 (1 January 2020 estimate).

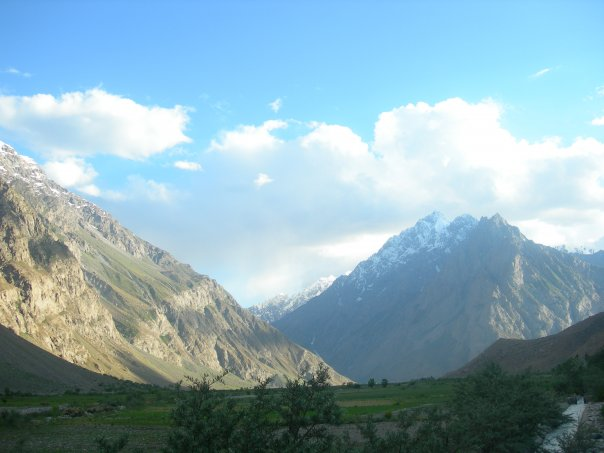
Rushon Air Gate

The district is home to Sarez Lake, which was formed as a result of an earthquake in 1911 in Bartang valley in the east of the district. Called "the Sleeping Dragon" by the native population, Sarez Lake is attracting growing attention of national and international experts for the study and mitigation of its potential threat of collapsing and causing devastating floods and landslides.

== Administrative divisions ==
The district has an area of about 5,900 km^{2} (2,000 sq mi) and is divided administratively into seven jamoats. They are as follows:

Jamoat	Population (Jan. 2015)
Dhertang (Abdulvosiev)	2,331
Bartang	2,185
Basid	1,480
Poytakht (Dodkhudoev)	6,128
Past-Khuf	3,208
Rushon	6,577
Savnob	3,047

== Infrastructure ==
Rushon (Vamar) has a hospital, post office, bank offices (Orienbank, Agroinvestbank). Also it has a small airport without a paved runway that has the capacity to service small aircraft like AN-28. The district also has one hydropower station in the village of Shujand (10 km from the district center) with a capacity of 600 kW. An additional diesel unit was built during the Soviet times, to meet the energy needs of the district, which was abandoned after the dissolution of the Soviet Union and has not been functional ever since.

== Language and culture ==
Rushani language is spoken here. Rushon is renowned for its arts and musical traditions. Many famous musicians including Gurminj Zavkibekov, Mohjon Nazardodova, Musavar Minakov, Sherali Abdulkaysov, Jonboz, Davlatyor Kurbonmamadov, Muboraksho Mirzoshoyev, Nobovar Chanorov, Daler Nazarov, Nargis Bandishoeva are natives of this district.

== See also ==
- Rushan people
