= Kurəcay =

Kurəcay (also, Kürəkçay) is a village and municipality in the Goranboy Rayon of Azerbaijan. It has a population of 504.
