= 1989 Chenoua earthquake =

Earthquake in Algeria

- Location within Algeria
- UTC time: Doublet earthquake:
- 1989-10-29 19:09:15
- 1989-10-29 19:21:54
- ISC event
- 391121
- 391124
- USGS-ANSS: ComCat
- Local date: October 29, 1989
- Local time
- 20:09:15
- 20:21:54
- Magnitude
- 5.9 M_{w}
- 5.9 M_{w}
- Depth: 10 km (6 mi)
- Epicenter: 36.77°N 2.39°E
- Fault: Mt. Chenoua
- Type: Reverse
- Total damage: $5 million
- Max. intensity: MMI VIII (Severe)
- Casualties: 22–35 dead 184–700 injured 15,000 displaced

The 1989 Chenoua earthquake occurred on October 29 at 19:09:15 local time in northern Algeria. The dip-slip event had a moment magnitude of 5.9 and a maximum Mercalli intensity of VIII (Severe). At least 22 were killed and many were injured with total losses of $5 million.
