= Usoi Dam =

Landslide dam on the Murghab River, Tajikistan

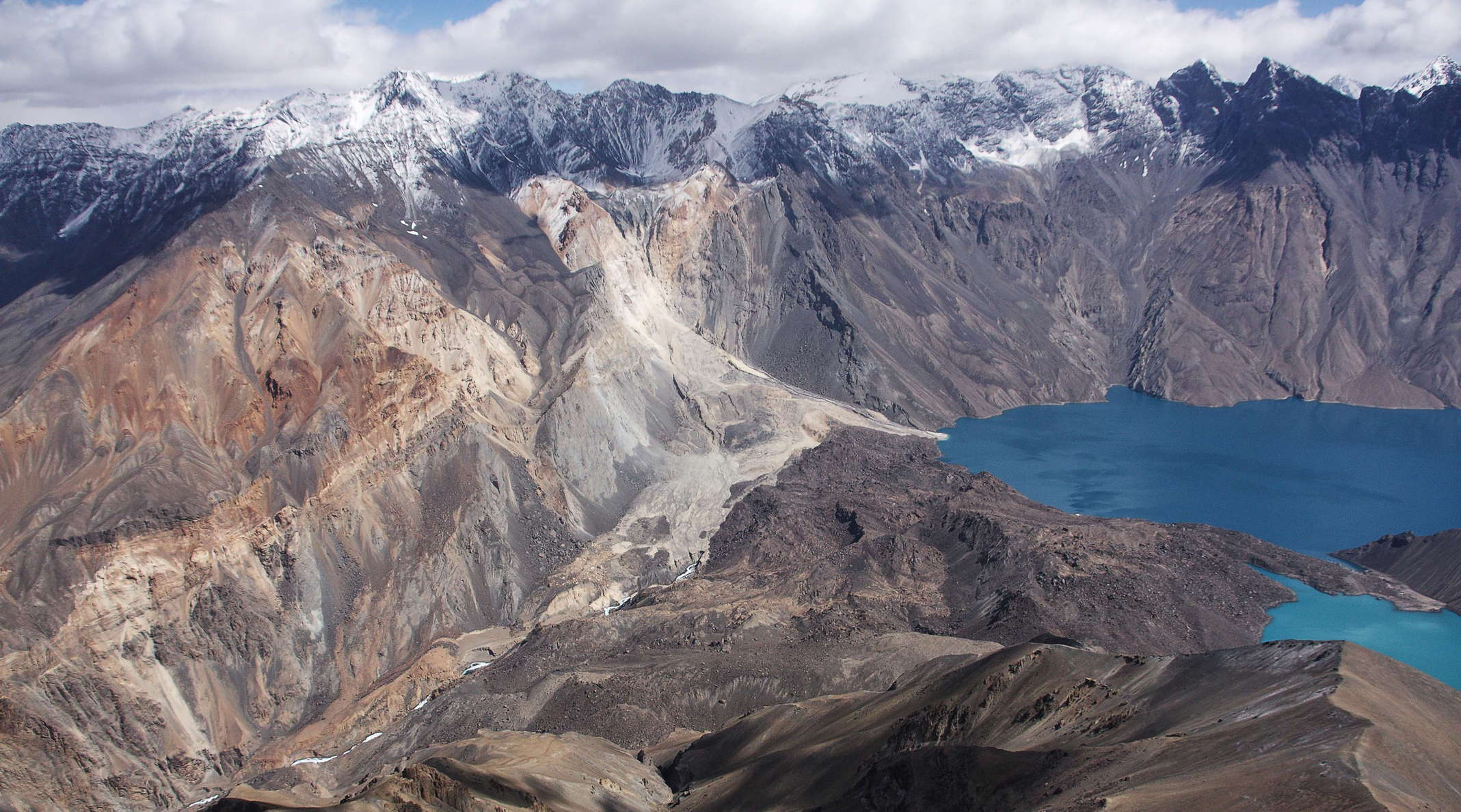
- Usoi Dam visible with Sarez Lake on the right. The outflow can be seen in the bottom left. Photo by Martin Mergili.
- Interactive map of Usoi Dam
- Country: Tajikistan
- Coordinates: 38.2810°N 72.6134°E
- Opening date: 18 February 1911

Dam and spillways
- Type of dam: Rockfill, landslide-created
- Impounds: Murghab River
- Height: 567 metres (1,860 ft)
- Length: 1,370 metres (4,490 ft)
- Dam volume: 2 cubic kilometres (0.48 mi^{3})

Reservoir
- Creates: Sarez Lake
- Total capacity: 16.074 cubic kilometres (13,031,000 acre⋅ft)
- Surface area: 7,970 hectares (19,700 acres)
- Maximum water depth: 505 metres (1,657 ft)

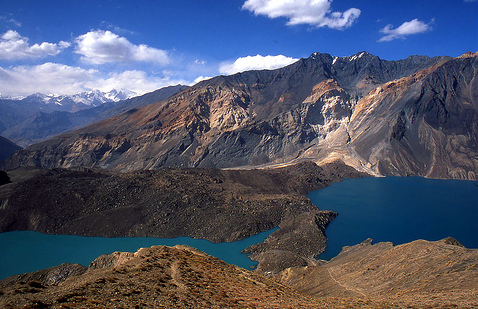
Usoi Dam viewed from behind. Sarez Lake is on the right, and the smaller body of water to the left is Shadau Lake.

The Usoi Dam is a natural landslide dam along the Murghab River in Tajikistan. At 567 metres (1,860 ft) high, it is the tallest dam in the world, either natural or man-made. The dam was created on 18 February 1911, when the 7.4-M_{s} Sarez earthquake caused a massive landslide that blocked the flow of the river.

The dam is formed of approximately 2 cubic kilometres (0.48 mi^{3}) of rock dislodged from the steeply sloped river valley of the Murghab, which cuts from east to west through the high and rough Pamir Mountains. It is named after the village of Usoi, which was completely buried by the 1911 landslide. The dam rises to a height of 500 to 700 metres (1,600 to 2,300 ft) from the original valley floor.

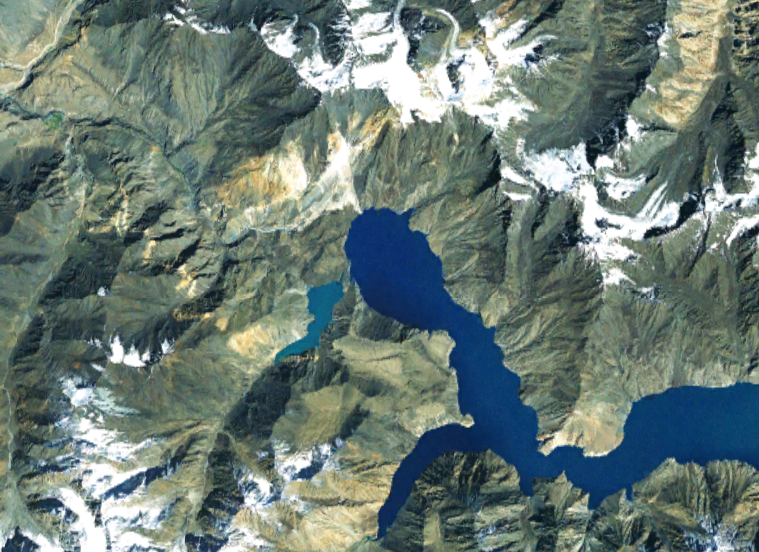
Satellite photo showing the Usoi Dam, the western end of Sarez Lake and the smaller Shadau Lake

The basin formed by Usoi Dam now holds Sarez Lake, a 55.8-kilometre (34.7 mi)-long lake holding 16.074 cubic kilometres (13,031,000 acre⋅ft) of water. Water does not flow over the top of the dam, which would quickly cause it to erode away; instead, water seeps out of the base of the dam at a rate which approximately matches the rate of inflow, maintaining the lake at a relatively constant level. The level thus only rises an average of 20 cm per year. The flow averages about 45 cubic meters per second, with an annual variation of 35-80 cubic meters per second and dissipates about 250 megawatts.

Geologists are concerned that the Usoi Dam may become unstable during future large-magnitude earthquakes, which are relatively common in the seismically active Pamirs, and might collapse due to liquefaction or subsequent landslides during such an event. Collapse of the dam would unleash a locally catastrophic flood. The Murghab's river valley tends to be relatively narrow and steep. This would focus and maintain any flood's destructive power as it swept through the valley of the Murghob District.

The dam wall survived a localised 7.2 magnitude earthquake, the 2015 Tajikistan earthquake, on 7 December 2015, with no visible signs of deterioration.
