= Klinja Vas =

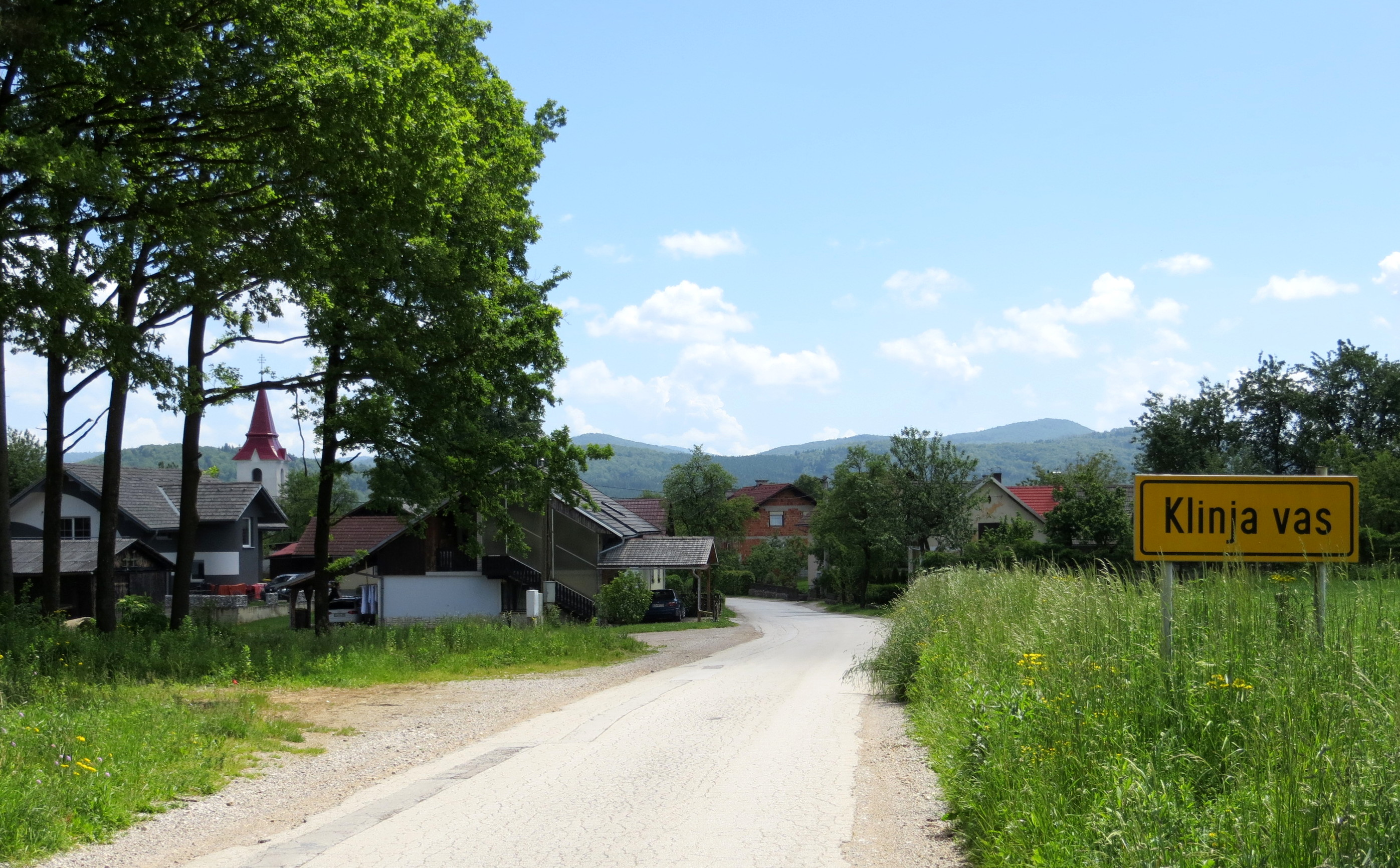

- Location in Slovenia
- Coordinates: 45°39′56.01″N 14°52′12.85″E
- Country: Slovenia
- Traditional region: Lower Carniola
- Statistical region: Southeast Slovenia
- Municipality: Kočevje

Area
  - Total: 3.75 km^{2} (1.45 sq mi)
- Elevation: 478.3 m (1,569 ft)

Population (2002)
  - Total: 235
- Postal code: 1330

Klinja Vas (pronounced [ˈkliːnja ˈʋaːs]; Slovene: Klinja vas, German: Klindorf, Gottscheerish: Klindoarf) is a village north of Kočevje in southern Slovenia. The area is part of the traditional region of Lower Carniola and is now included in the Southeast Slovenia Statistical Region.

== Name ==
The Slovene name Klinja Vas and the German name Klindorf both literally mean 'Klin village'. Klin was a surname recorded in the land registry of 1574, and so the name means 'village where the Klin family lives'. The surname Klin (along with similar surnames like Klinar) is believed to be derived from the Slovene common noun klin 'triangular, wedge-shaped piece of land'.

== History ==
Klinja Vas was a Gottschee German village. It is one of the oldest settlements in Gottschee. According to the land registry of 1574 it had eight full farms divided into 16 half-farms with 20 landowners, corresponding to a population between 80 and 85. In 1770 there were 33 houses in the settlement. The village reached its prewar maximum population in 1921, with 43 houses and 223 people. Before the Second World War, six ethnic Slovene families also lived in the village, which had 50 houses and a population of 163. The economy of Klinja Vas was connected with farming and woodcutting, and there were also several blacksmiths, carpenters, and joiners in the settlement. There were also two inns in the village, belonging to the Michitsch and Schober families. At the time, there was some emigration from the village to Canada. The ethnic German residents of the village, numbering 118 people from 29 families, were evicted during the Second World War. The village came under Partisan aerial bombardment on 24 April 1945 in an attack aimed at a German post in neighboring Mahovnik. After the war, only 17 houses remained habitable and there was a population of 73. New settlers came to the village from the areas of Ribnica, Loški Potok, and Dry Carniola (Slovene: Suha krajina). There is a large hog farm east of the village today, where many of the villagers work.

== Church ==
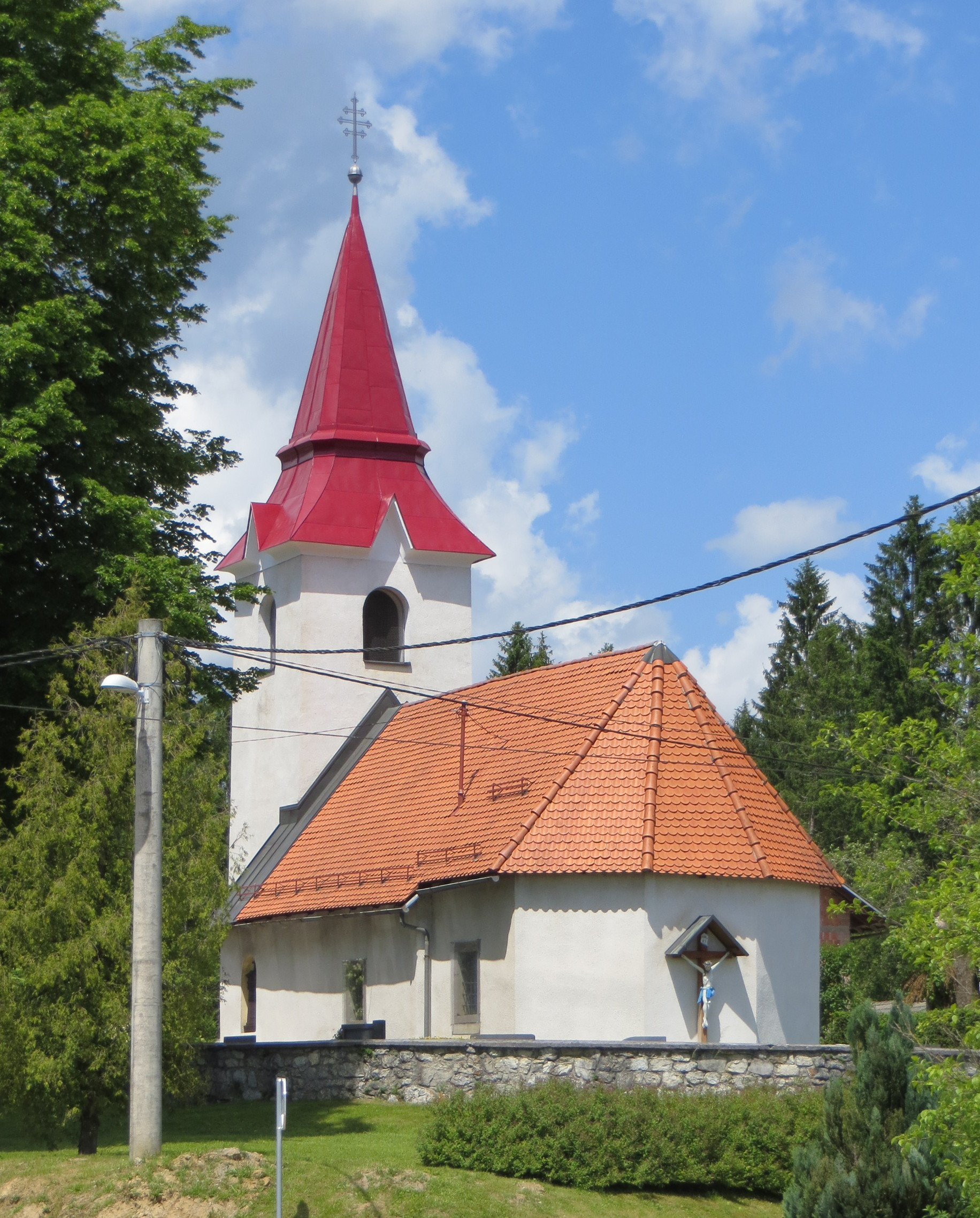
Saint Mary Magdalene Church

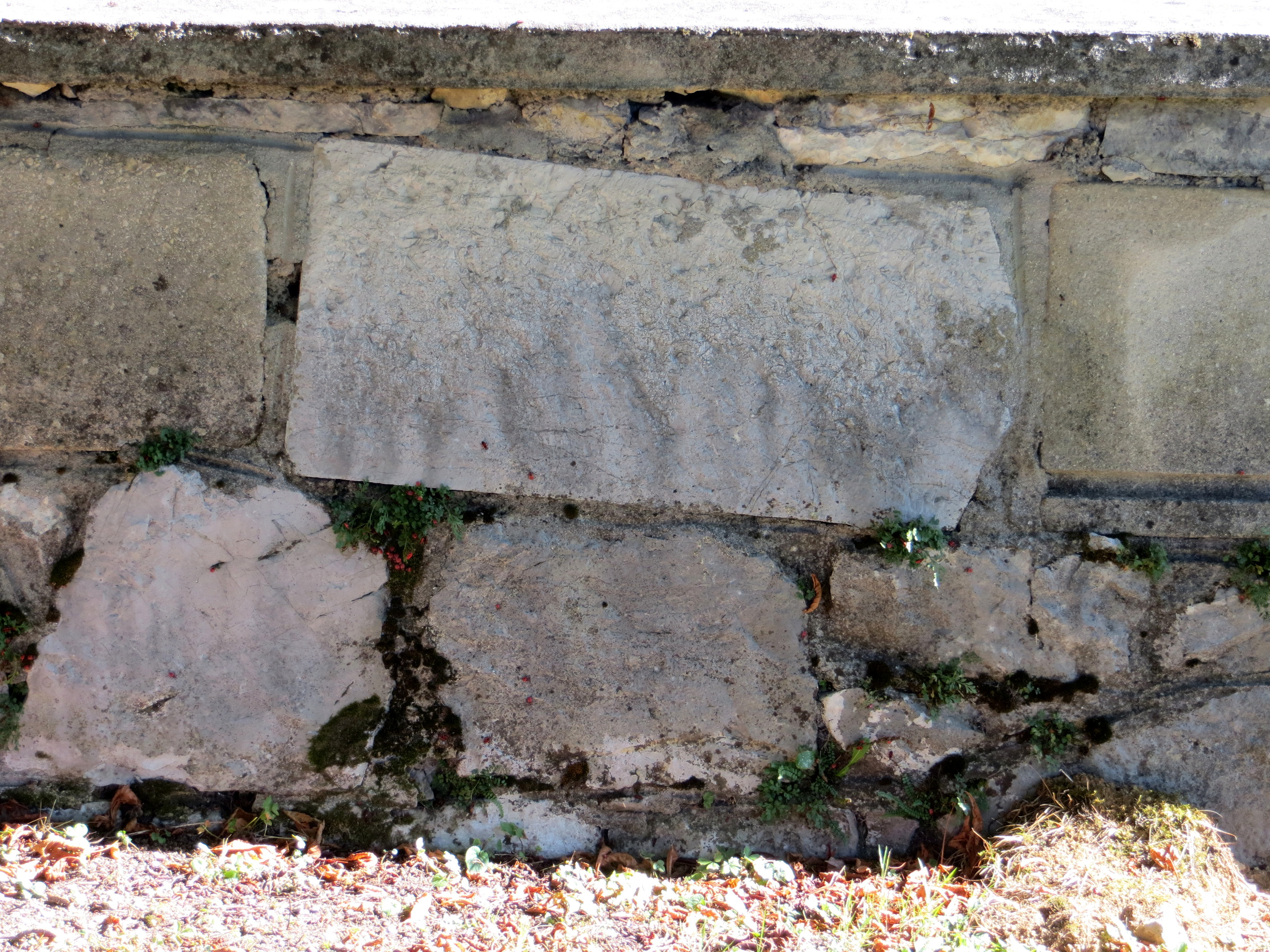
Gravestone embedded in cemetery wall

The local church is dedicated to Mary Magdalene and belongs to the Parish of Kočevje. It has a painted wooden ceiling dating to around 1660 in its nave. In the 17th century, the church was dedicated to the Holy Trinity. It had a shingled roof (now replaced by ceramic roof tiles) and obtained its current appearance in the 17th century, when the bell-gable was replaced by a square bell tower. The original bells were removed by Austrian troops during the First World War. The two bells now in the bell tower were cast at the Bühl foundry in Maribor in 1924, and the larger one has a German inscription invoking the aid of Mary Magdalene. The painted wooden ceiling in the nave is divided into four fields, with the central field depicting Saints Peter and Paul, and the others with angelic heads and flowers and fruit. The polygonal chancel is walled on three sides. The main altar is a neo-Gothic work dating to 1896 by Peter Rutar from Osilnica. Behind the altar is a painting of Christ crucified with blood flowing from an overturned chalice.

The church is surrounded by a walled cemetery. After the Second World War, most of the Gottschee German gravestone were removed from the cemetery. It is believed that some of them were built into the wall of the cemetery, but their inscriptions are turned inward and so they cannot be read.
