= Karakul (Tajikistan) =

Lake in Tajikistan

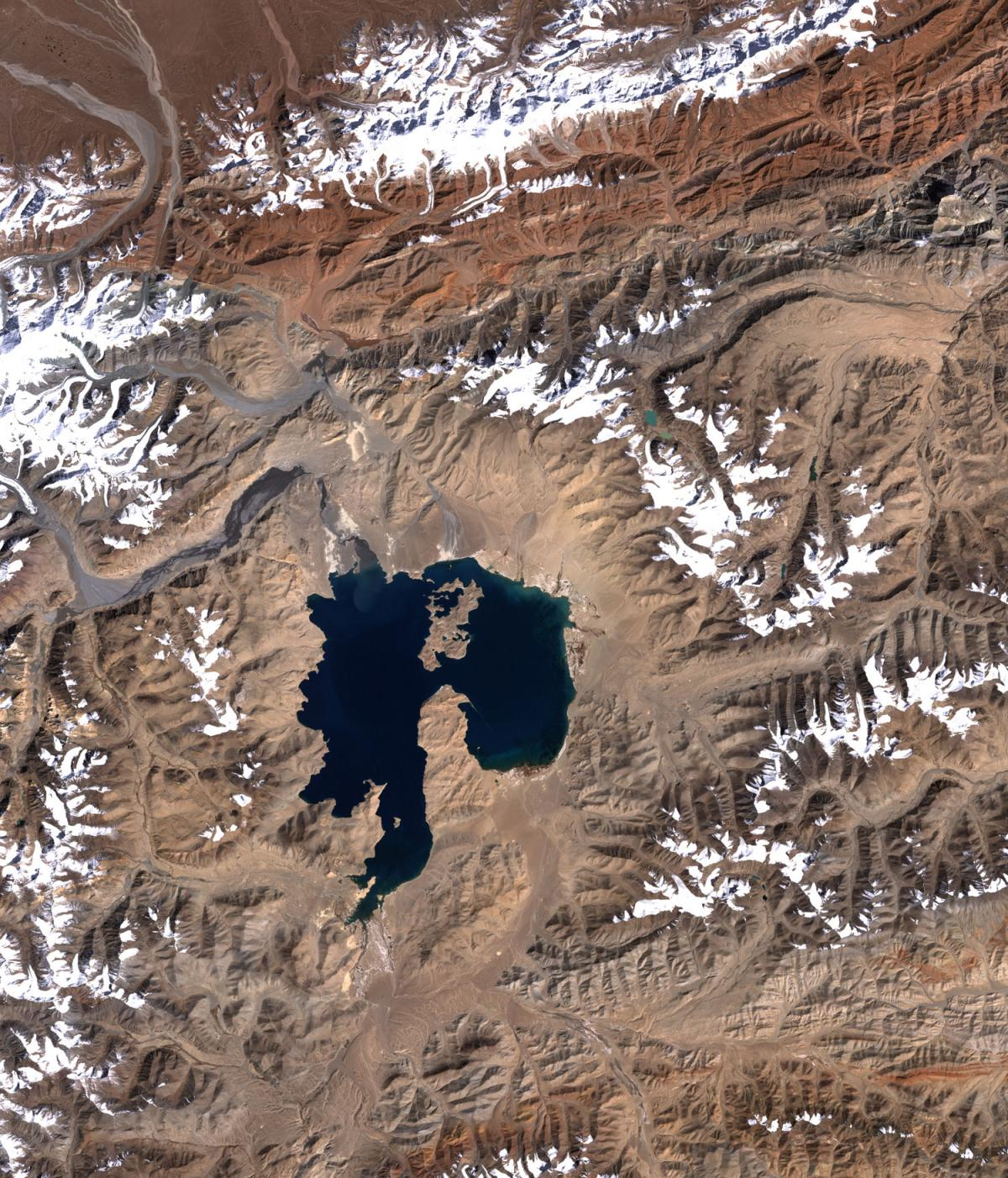
- Landsat 7 satellite image of Karakul from 2001

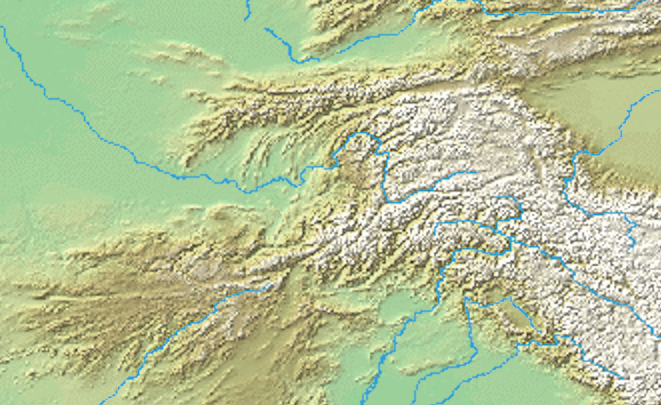
- Location in Tajikistan Karakul (Pamir)
- Interactive map of Karakul
- Location: Pamir Mountains
- Coordinates: 39°02′24″N 73°25′12″E
- Type: Impact crater lake, endorheic
- Primary outflows: None
- Basin countries: Tajikistan
- Max. width: 52 km (32 mi)
- Surface area: 380 km^{2} (150 sq mi)
- Average depth: 210 m (690 ft)
- Max. depth: 230 m (750 ft)
- Water volume: 79.8 km^{3} (19.1 cu mi)
- Surface elevation: 3,960 m (12,990 ft)

Ramsar Wetland
- Official name: Karakul Lake
- Designated: 18 July 2001
- Reference no.: 1082

Karakul or Qarokul (Kyrgyz for "black lake", replacing the older Tajik name Siob; Russian: Каракуль; Tajik: Қарокӯл; Uyghur: قاراكۆل, romanized: Qaraköl, Қаракөл; Kyrgyz: Каракөл) is an endorheic lake, 25 km (16 mi) in diameter, located within a 52 km (32 mi) impact crater. It is located in the Tajik National Park in the Pamir Mountains in Tajikistan.

== Impact crater ==
Karakul lies within a circular depression, which has been interpreted as an impact crater with a rim diameter of 52 km (32 mi). Some estimates say the impact is relatively recent. A preliminary estimate dated it to between 25 Ma and 23 Ma. However, it may be from the recent Pliocene epoch (5.3 to 2.6 Ma). The Earth Impact Database (EID) also lists it as younger than 5 Ma. It is larger than the Eltanin impact (2.5 Ma), which has already been suggested as a contributor to the cooling and ice cap formation in the Northern Hemisphere during the late Pliocene.

The Karakul impact structure was first identified around 1987 through studies of imagery taken from space.

== Lake description ==
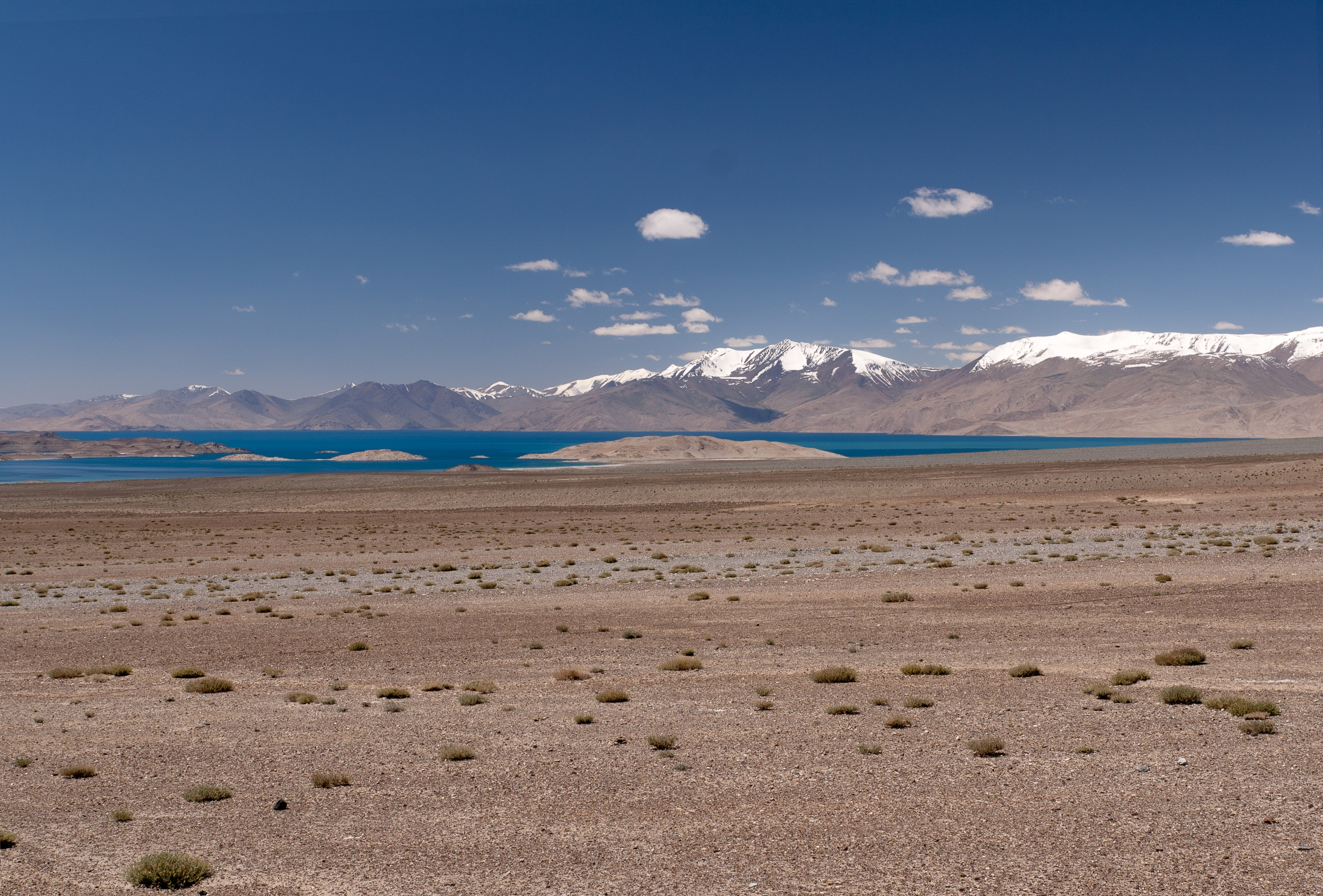
Karakul as seen from the Pamir Highway

The lake/crater lies at an elevation of 3,960 m (12,990 ft) above mean sea level. A peninsula projecting from the south shore and an island off the north shore divide the lake into two basins: a smaller, relatively shallow eastern one, between 13 and 19 m (43 and 62 ft) deep, and a larger western one, 221 to 230 m (725 to 755 ft) deep. It is endorheic (lacking a drainage outlet) and the water is brackish. There is a small village with the same name on the eastern shore of the lake.

The lake level was 35 m higher after the last ice age.

== Environment ==
Although the lake lies within a national park, much of the surroundings are used as pasture. The lake, with its islands, marshes, wet meadows, peat bogs, and pebbly and sandy plains, has been identified by BirdLife International as an Important Bird Area (IBA) because it supports significant numbers of the populations of various bird species, either as residents, or as breeding or passage migrants.

These species include bar-headed geese, ruddy shelducks, common mergansers, saker falcons, Himalayan vultures, lesser sand plovers, brown-headed gulls, Tibetan sandgrouse, yellow-billed choughs, Himalayan rubythroats, white-winged redstarts, white-winged snowfinches, rufous-streaked accentors, brown accentors, black-headed mountain finches and Caucasian great rosefinches. The lake's islands are the main places where waterbirds rest and nest.

The only fish in the lake are Triplophysa lacusnigri.

== Events ==
Higher than Lake Titicaca, Karakul hosted the Roof of the World Regatta from 2014 to 2017. This replaced the Alpine Bank Dillon Open, held on the Dillon Reservoir in Colorado, United States as the highest sailing regatta in the world.
