= China–Tajikistan relations =

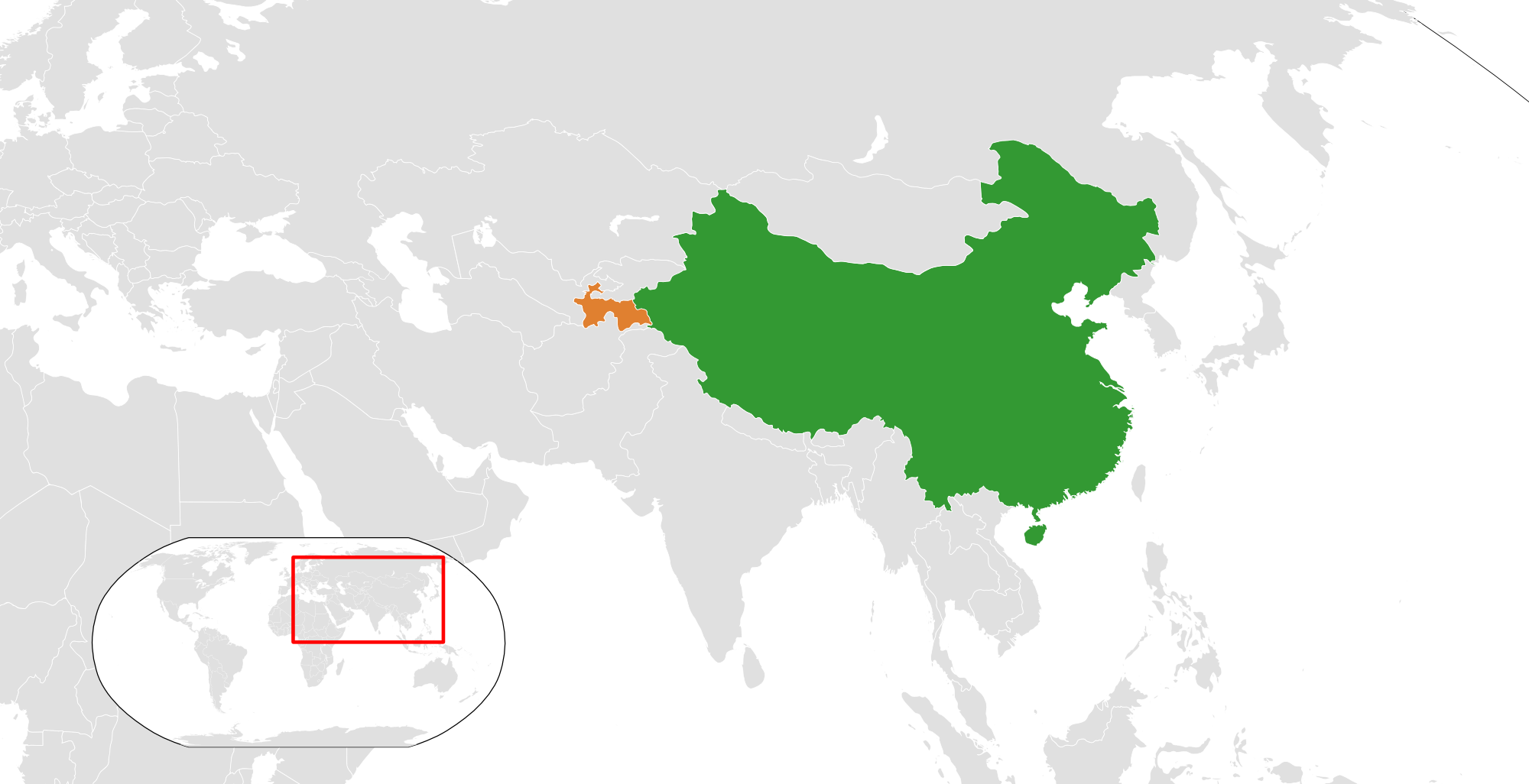

- China: Tajikistan

Diplomatic mission
- Chinese Embassy, Dushanbe: Tajik Embassy, Beijing

Envoy
- Ambassador Ji Shumin: Ambassador Saidzoda Zohir Ozod

The People's Republic of China and the Republic of Tajikistan have friendly relations characterized by bilateral and multilateral collaboration.

== History ==
The two countries established formal relations on January 4, 1992, shortly after the dissolution of the Soviet Union. As the leader of Tajikistan, now-President Emomali Rahmon first visited Beijing in March 1993 and met with CCP General Secretary Jiang Zemin and Chinese President Yang Shangkun. China's embassy in Dushanbe has been functioning since March 13, 1992 and the Tajik embassy in Beijing was established on April 7, 1997.

== Economy and trade ==
The total trade turnover between the two countries in 2012 has reached U.S. $2 billion. China is among the three largest trade partners of Tajikistan. A number of large Chinese enterprises in various industries operate in Tajikistan. In 2012, Tajikistan obtained China's promise to provide it with nearly US$1 billion in the form of grants, technical assistance and credits on preferential terms.

Tajikistan and China have signed approximately 200 agreements on trade, health, agriculture, and education.

In 2022, China accounted for 17.5% of Tajikistan's total trade, second largest after Russia.

Tajikistan is active in China's Belt and Road Initiative, which it joined in 2018. Tajikistan views the BRI as an opportunity to increase inbound foreign direct investment, modernize its transportation infrastructure, and build better connections with Europe and China.

== Border dispute ==
China had a longstanding territorial claim on about 28,430 square kilometers (10.977 square miles) of Tajik territory since 1884, which was taken from the then Qing dynasty by unequal treaties.

In 2011, as part of a boundary agreement, China officially relinquished its claim on 96% of the total disputed territory, while Tajikistan ceded around 4% - about 1,137 square km (439 square miles) – to China.

== Sovereignty issues ==
Tajikistan follows the one China principle, and recognizes government of the People's Republic of China as the sole legal government representing the whole of China and Taiwan as "an inalienable part" of China. Tajikistan also supports all efforts by the PRC to "achieve national reunification" and opposes Taiwan independence.

In July 2019, Tajikistan was one of 50 countries that supported China's policies in Xinjiang, signing a joint letter to the UNHRC commending China's "remarkable achievements in the field of human rights", claiming "Now safety and security has returned to Xinjiang and the fundamental human rights of people of all ethnic groups there are safeguarded. Tajikistan was one of 16 countries that defended China in 2019 but did not do so in 2020.

In June 2020, Tajikistan was one of 53 countries that supported the Hong Kong national security law at the United Nations.

== Military and security cooperation ==
Because it has a border with China's Xinjiang region, which contains numerous ethnic minorities, Tajikistan's political stability is critical to China.

The governments of China and Tajikistan collaborate on security and military training; this collaboration has become stronger since the 2001 United States invasion of Afghanistan. The two countries' militaries have conducted joint military exercises since 2006. In 2021 amid security concerns related to the 2021 Taliban offensive, Chinese Minister of Public Security Zhao Kezhi said that the military exercises would improve both countries' counterterrorism efforts.

It is alleged that Chinese troops have been present in Tajikistan since approximately 2016, with the purpose of monitoring access to the Wakhan Corridor. The Minister of Foreign Affairs of the Republic of Tajikistan denied that there are Chinese troops in Tajikistan.

In November 2024 a likely drug-related attack happened near the Afghan border in Tajikistan, killing a Chinese worker.

== Culture and education ==
Tajikistan has two Confucius Institutes.

== High-level visits ==
Guest	Host	Place of visit	Date of visit
(Tajikistan) President Emomali Rahmon	(China) President & CCP General Secretary Xi Jinping	Beijing	May 19–21, 2013
(China) Premier Li Keqiang	(Tajikistan) President Emomali Rahmon	Dushanbe	October 11–14, 2018
(China) President & CCP General Secretary Xi Jinping	(Tajikistan) President Emomali Rahmon	Dushanbe	June 14–16, 2019.
(Tajikistan) President Emomali Rahmon	(China) President & CCP General Secretary Xi Jinping	Xi'an, Beijing	May 17–21, 2023

== Resident diplomatic missions ==
- China has an embassy in Dushanbe.
- Tajikistan has an embassy in Beijing.

== See also ==
- Beyik Pass
- China–Tajikistan border
- Sarikol Range
- Chinese Tajiks
- Tajiks in China
