= Nezatash Pass =

Mountain pass in Tajikistan and China

- Location within Southern Xinjiang Location within Tajikistan
- Interactive map of Nezatash Pass
- Elevation: 4,476 metres (14,685 ft)

Third Approach
- Location: China–Tajikistan border
- Range: Sarikol_Range, Pamir Mountains
- Coordinates: 37.5944°N 74.9353°E

Nezatash Pass

Chinese name
- Traditional Chinese: 納茲塔什山口
- Simplified Chinese: 纳兹塔什山口
Transcriptions
Standard Mandarin
- Hanyu Pinyin: nàcítǎshén shānkǒu

Alternative Chinese name
- Traditional Chinese: 奈扎塔什山隘
- Simplified Chinese: 奈扎塔什山隘
Transcriptions
Standard Mandarin
- Hanyu Pinyin: nàizhātǎshén shānài

Tajik language name
- Tajik language: Ағбаи Найзатош

The Nezatash Pass or Neza-Tash Pass (Tajik: Ағбаи Найзатош; Aghbai Nayzatosh) is a mountain pass in the Sarikol Range between Gorno-Badakhshan Autonomous Province in Tajikistan and Tashkurgan Tajik Autonomous County in Xinjiang, China. It is situated at an elevation of 4,476 metres (14,685 ft). The name of the path means "spear stone" in Kyrgyz as it is named after a rock near the location.

== History ==
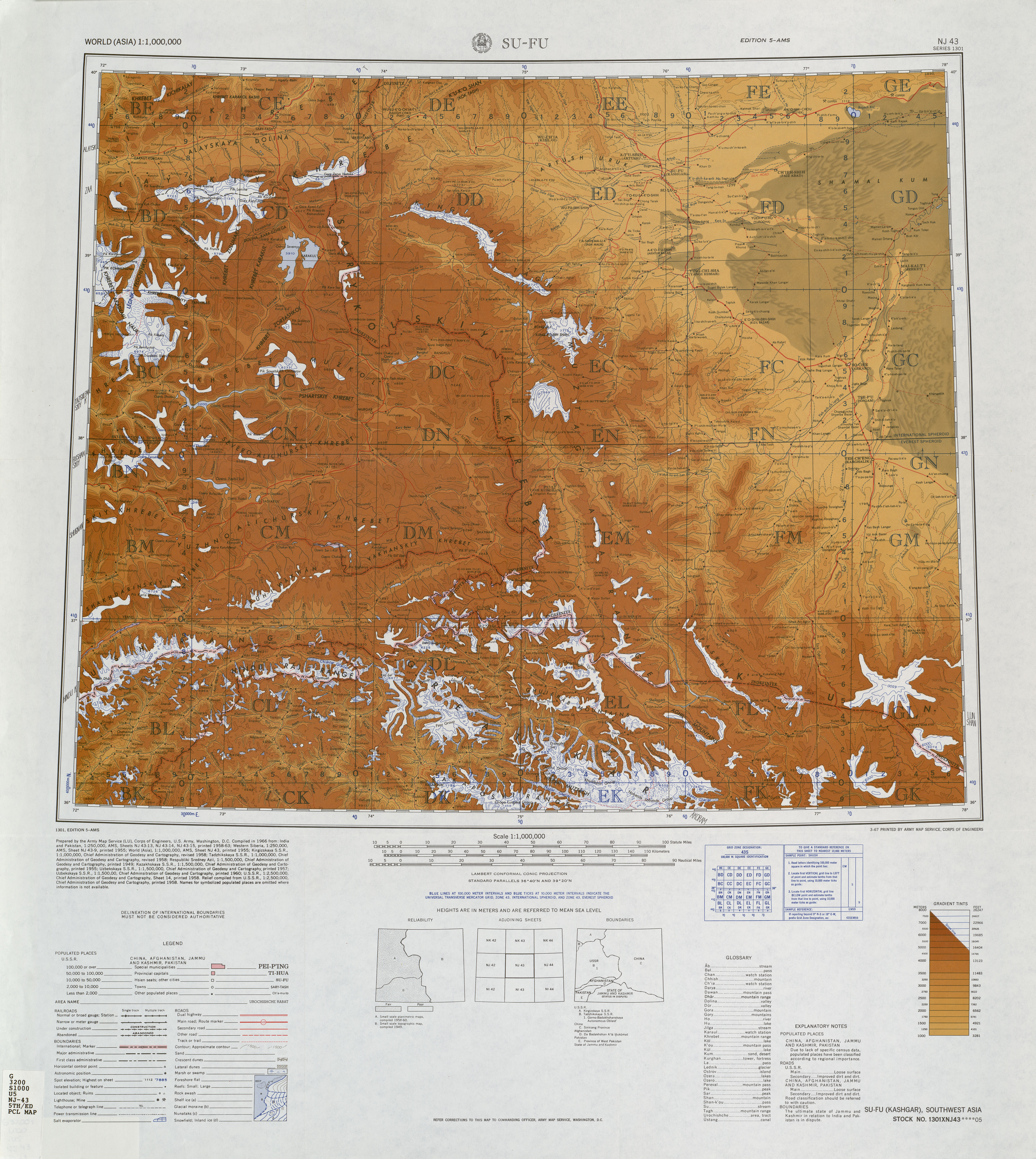
Map including Beyik Pass (labeled as NI-JO-T'A-SHIH SHAN-K'OU) (AMS, 1966)

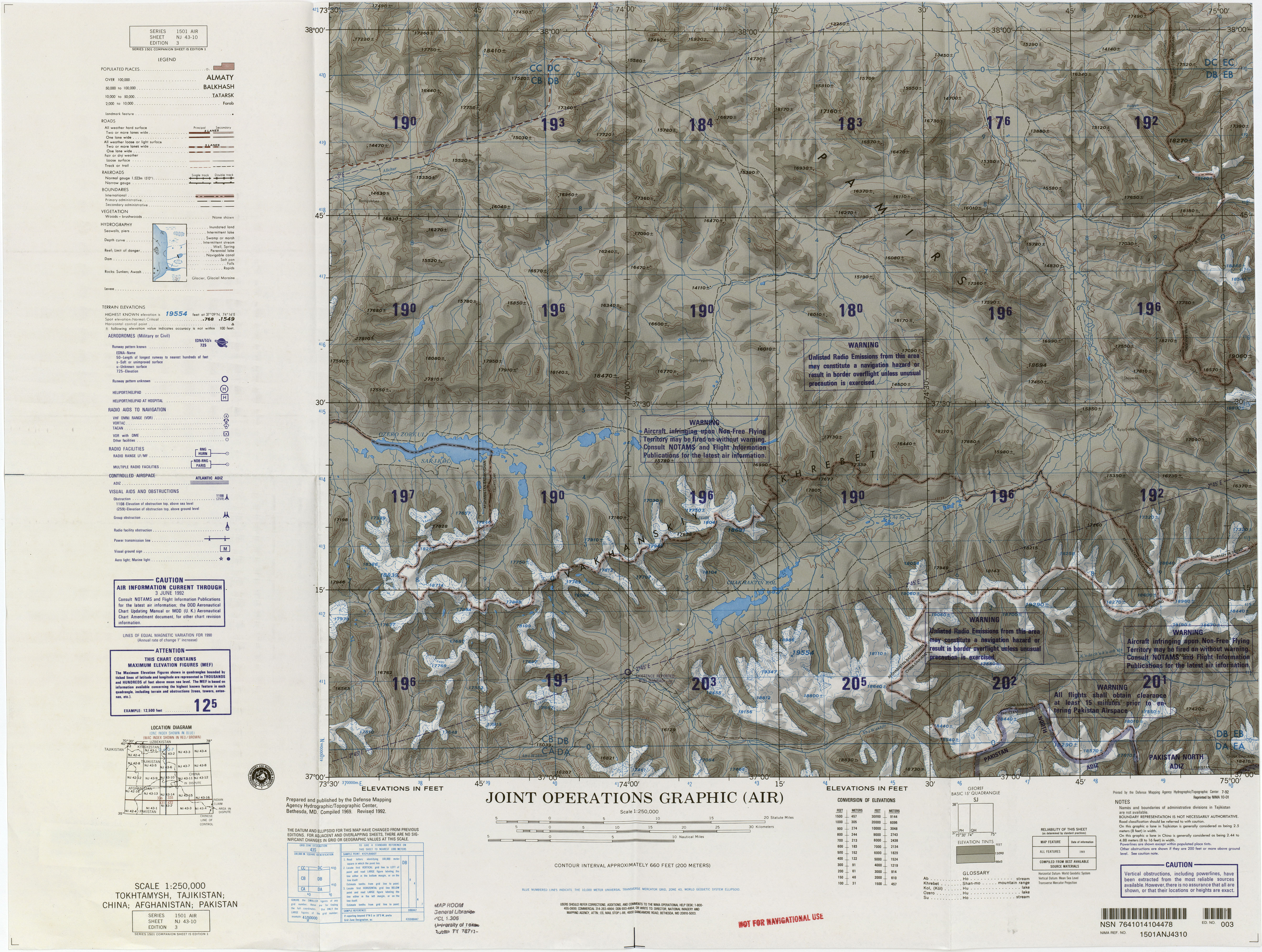
Map including the Nezatash Pass area (1992)

Neztash Pass is a minor path on the Silk Road. During ancient times, it was not a main Silk Road route due to the fact that it took traveler far from settlements, lacked sources of water, and had a relatively higher elevation.

However, during the 19th century, Neztash Pass was frequently used by European explorers passing through the region.

That path sits on the border between China and Tajikistan in the historic region of Badakhshan. In the 1890s, the Chinese, Russian, and Afghan governments signed a series of agreements that divided Badakhshan, but China contested the result of the division. The dispute was eventually settled in 2002 when Tajikistan and China signed a border agreement.

== See also ==
- China–Tajikistan border
- Kulma_Pass
- Beyik Pass
- Tegermansu Pass
- Wakhjir Pass
- Chalachigu Valley
- Afghanistan–China border
