= Kulma Pass =

Mountain pass between China and Tajikistan

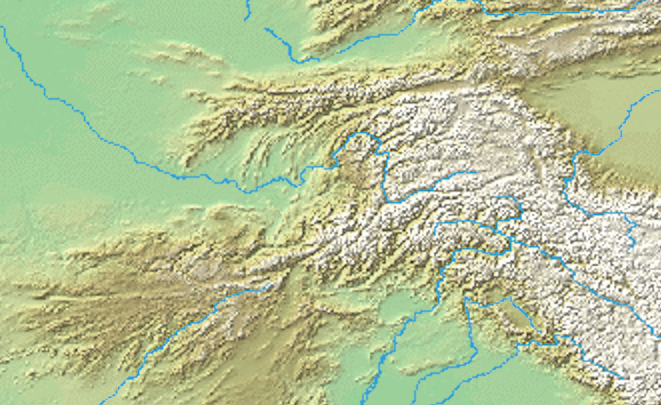
- Location within Southern Xinjiang Location within Tajikistan Location within Pamir
- Interactive map of Kulma Pass
- Elevation: 4,362.7 metres (14,313 ft)

Third Approach
- Location: China–Tajikistan border
- Range: Sarikol Range, Pamir Mountains
- Coordinates: 38.1494°N 74.8014°E

Kulma Pass
- Traditional Chinese: 闊勒買山口
- Simplified Chinese: 阔勒买山口
- Literal meaning: Kulma Pass
Transcriptions
Standard Mandarin
- Hanyu Pinyin: kuòlèmǎi shānkǒu

Alternative Chinese name
- Traditional Chinese: 卡拉蘇口岸
- Simplified Chinese: 卡拉苏口岸
- Literal meaning: Karasu Port
Transcriptions
Standard Mandarin
- Hanyu Pinyin: kǎlāsū kǒu'àn

The Kulma Pass (Tajik: Перевал Кульма, Chinese: 阔勒买山口) or Qolma Pass, also referred to as Karasu Pass, is a mountain pass across the Pamir Mountains on the border between Murghob District, Gorno-Badakhshan Autonomous Region in Tajikistan and Taxkorgan Tajik Autonomous County, Kashgar Prefecture, Xinjiang Uygur Autonomous Region in China. Asian Highway AH66 runs through the pass, which provides for the only modern day overland border crossing along the 450 km boundary between the two nations.

The pass has an elevation of 4,362.7 metres (14,313 ft) and opens from the north to the southeast, and is 500 m wide from north to south and 1 km in length from east to west with a gentle incline not exceeding 20 percent. On the Tajik side, the pass is 80 km by road to Murghab and about 850 km to Dushanbe. On the Chinese side, the pass is 13.9 km from Karasu (卡拉苏口岸), a port of entry on the Karakorum Highway which leads to Tashkurgan (60–70 km) and Kashgar (220 km). In the past, the pass used to be open from the 16th to the 30th day of each month from May to November. In most recent years it is open all weekdays all year round (except for national festivities).

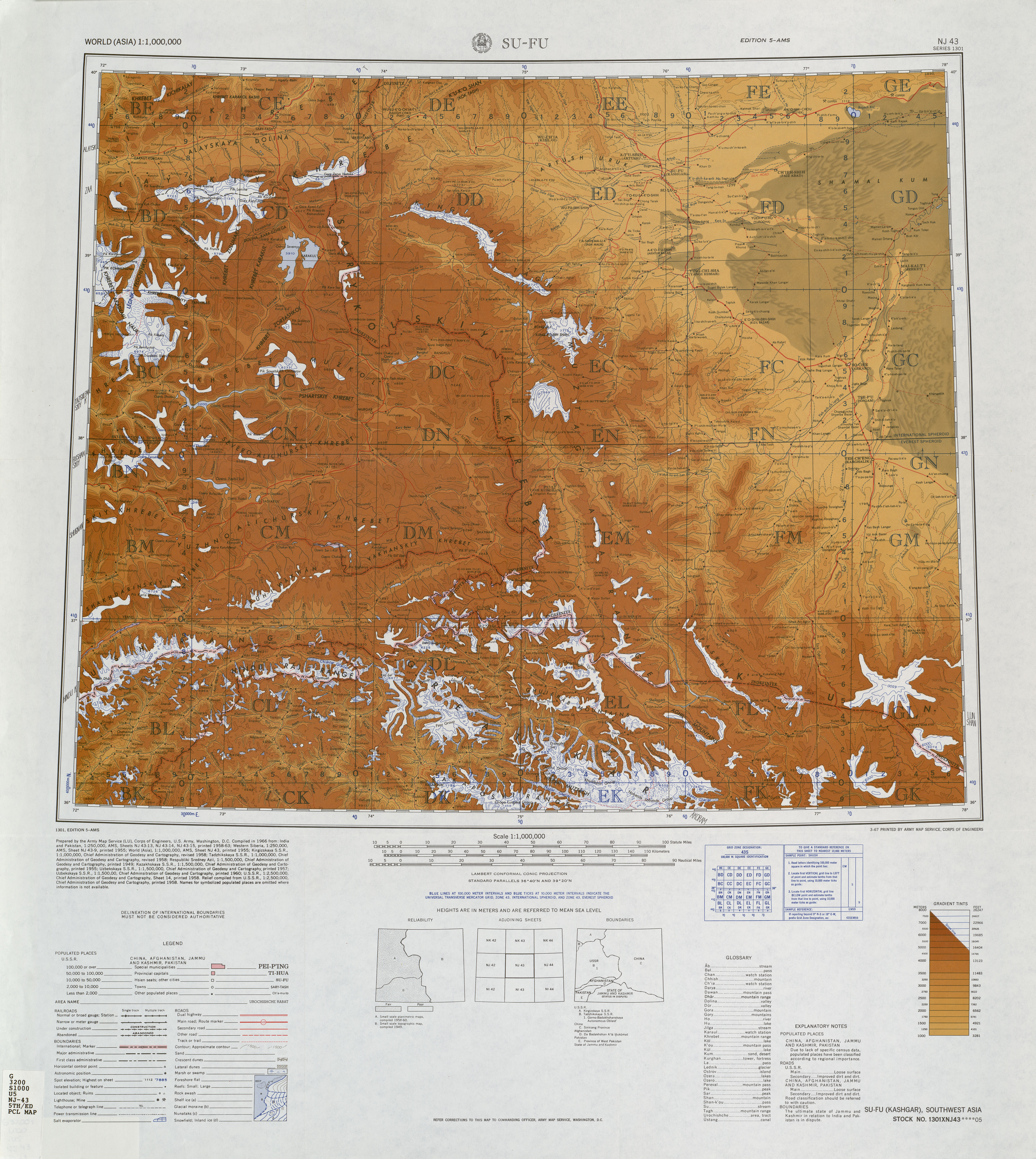
Map including the Kulma Pass area; from the International Map of the World (AMS, 1966) (Note: From map: "DELINEATION OF INTERNATIONAL BOUNDARIES MUST NOT BE CONSIDERED AUTHORITATIVE")

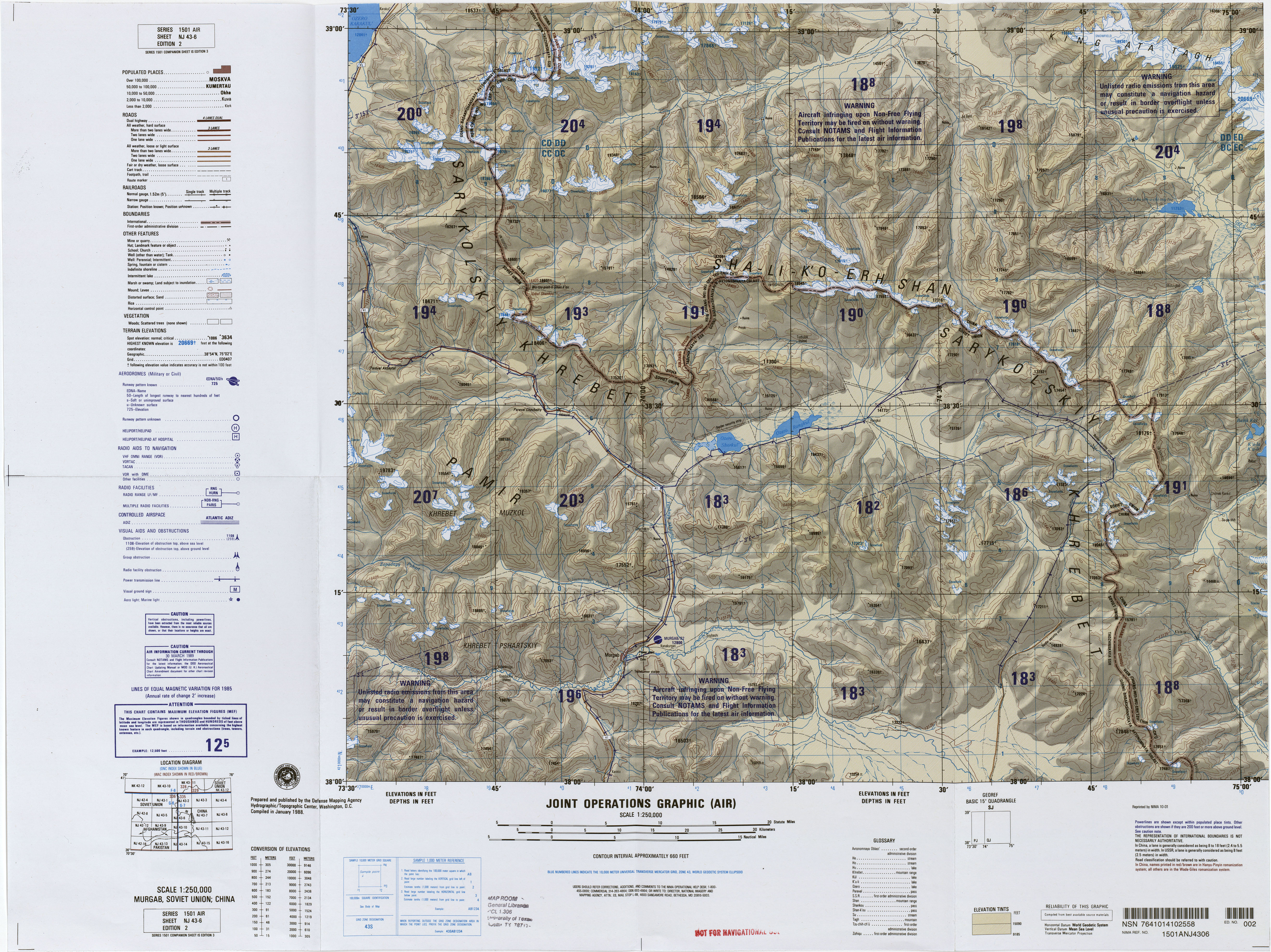
Map including the Kulma Pass area (1988)

The pass was closed for many years due to political tensions between the Soviet Union and China, and then the Tajikistani Civil War. In 1997, China and Tajikistan signed an agreement to develop a commercial corridor between the two countries through the pass. The opening of the pass reduced cargo travel time between the two countries by ten to fifteen days, obviating lengthy detours into Kyrgyzstan and Uzbekistan.

== Karasu Port of Entry ==
The Karasu Port of Entry opened on May 25, 2004, and traffic volume grew considerably. In the first three months after the pass opened, an official tally by the Tajik Ministry of Traffic and Roads counted legal crossings of just 17 trucks, 10 buses, 240 tons of cargo, and 171 people over a three-month period. Unofficial transits are believed to be more common, as many locals lack passports needed to cross the pass legally.

From May to August 2006, the Chinese Ministry of Commerce registered 649 cargo shipments totaling 11,218.5 metric tons of goods. In the same three months the following year, traffic volume reached 1,836 cargo shipments and 30,556 metric tons. In all, travelers made 12,500 trips through the pass in 2007 transporting 56,300 metric tons of goods worth US$250 million. Commonly traded goods include automobiles, construction materials, machinery, electronics, furniture, eggs, and rice.

In 2013, 31,000 tons of goods were shipped through the Kulma Pass and processed at the Karasu Border Crossing.

The bilateral agreement signed between China and Tajikistan includes the opening of the pass for nationals of all countries. After an initial period where foreigners were still turned back, since 2017, foreign travelers have been passing regularly and without extra problems.

== See also ==
- China–Tajikistan border
- China National Highway 314
- Beyik Pass
- Nezatash Pass
