= Kulma =

Kulma may refer to:

- The Kulma Pass, a mountain pass across the Pamir Mountains on the border between the Gorno-Badakhshan Autonomous Region of Tajikistan and the Xinjiang Autonomous Region of China
- kulma, a curry from the Southern Philippines

== See also ==
- Külma (disambiguation), villages in Estonia
