= AH66 =

Road in Asia

Asian Highway 66 (AH66) is a road in the Asian Highway Network running 995 kilometres (618 mi) from Qarasu Border Port, Xinjiang, China to Dushanbe, Tajikistan connecting AH4 (Chinese Road 314 (Karakoram Highway)) to Dushanbe. The route is as follows:

== China ==
- Qarasu Border Port

== Tajikistan ==
- РБ04 РБ04 Road : Kulma Pass - Murghab - Khorugh - Kalaikhumb - Vahdat - Dushanbe
