= Kilik Pass =

High altitude border pass between Pakistan and China

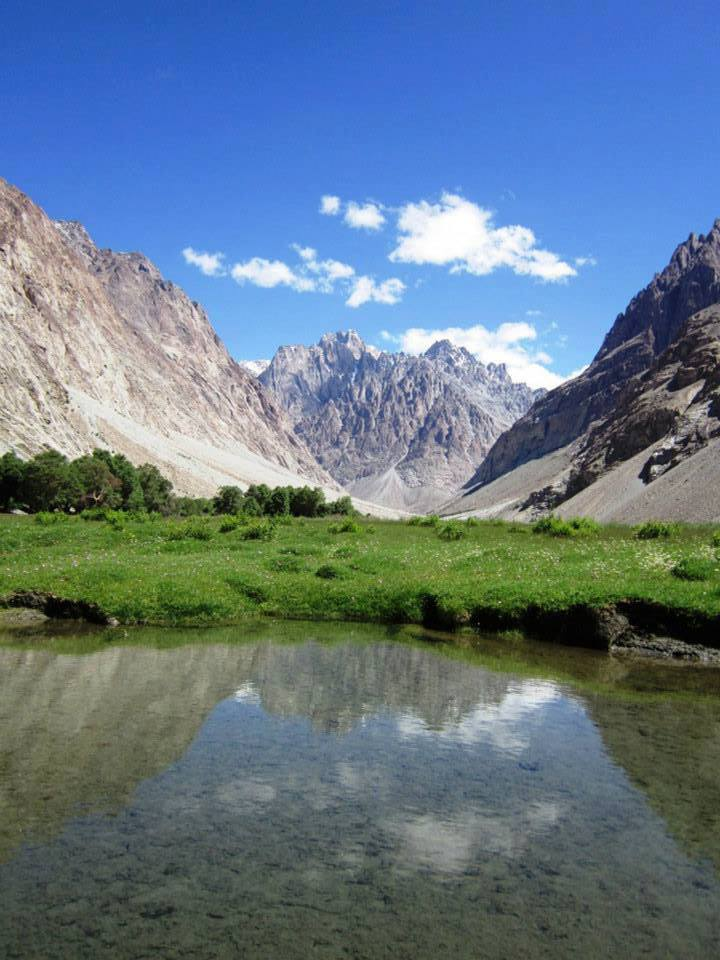

- Location within Southern Xinjiang Location within China Location within Gilgit Baltistan Location within Pakistan
- Interactive map of Kilik Pass
- Elevation: 4,827 metres (15,837 ft)

Third Approach
- Location: China–Pakistan border
- Range: Pamir Mountains
- Coordinates: 37.0832°N 74.6756°E

Kilik Pass

Chinese name
- Traditional Chinese: 基里克達坂
- Simplified Chinese: 基里克达坂
Transcriptions
Standard Mandarin
- Hanyu Pinyin: jīlǐkè dábǎn

Alternative Chinese name
- Traditional Chinese: 克里克山口
- Simplified Chinese: 克里克山口
Transcriptions
Standard Mandarin
- Hanyu Pinyin: kèlǐkè shānkǒu

Uyghur name
- Uyghur: كىلىك ئېغىزى

Urdu name
- Urdu: کِلیک درہ

The Kilik Pass (elevation 4,827 m or 15,837 ft; Chinese: 基里克达坂; Urdu: کلوک پاس) to the west of Mintaka Pass is a high mountain pass in the Pamir Mountains between Gilgit-Baltistan in Pakistan and Xinjiang in China. The two passes were, in ancient times, the two main access points into the Upper Hunza Valley (also called Gojal Valley) from the north. In addition, the two passes were also the paths used to reach Chalachigu Valley and Taghdumbash Pamir from the south.

== History ==
In ancient times, Mintaka Pass and Kilik Pass were the shortest and quickest way into northern India from the Tarim Basin, and one that was usually open all year, but was extremely dangerous and only suited for travellers on foot. From Tashkurgan one travelled just over 70 kilometres (40 mi) south to the junction of the Minteke River, modern day Chalachigu River. Heading some 80 kilometres (50 mi) west up this valley one reached the Mintaka Pass, (and 30 kilometres (20 mi) further, the alternative Kilik Pass), which both led into upper Hunza from where one could travel over the infamous rafiqs or "hanging passages" to Gilgit and on, either to Kashmir, or to the Gandharan plains.

Laden animals could be taken over the Mintaka and Kilik passes into upper Hunza (both open all year), but then loads would have to be carried by coolie (porters) to Gilgit (an expensive and dangerous operation). From there, cargoes could be reloaded onto pack animals again and taken either east to Kashmir and then on to Taxila (a long route), or west to Chitral which provided relatively easy access to either Jalalabad, or Peshawar via Swat.

The Mintaka Pass was the main one used in ancient times until the fairly recent advance of glacier ice. After the glaciation of the Mintaka Pass, the Kilik Pass was favoured by caravans coming from China and Afghanistan as it is wider, free of glaciers and provided enough pasture for caravan animals.

The "Sacred Rock of Hunza" has numerous petroglyphs depicting mounted horseman and ibex along with Kharoshthi inscriptions that mention Saka and Pahlava rulers. Historians assess that Maues must have used the Karakorum route via Mintaka or Kilik passes to capture Taxila in the first century BCE.

During the 1890s, the British established outposts near the pass as part of the Great Game against Russia. The area was surveyed and Kilik Pass was deemed easily defensible in the event of a Russian invasion. This likely influenced the boundary delineation in the area.

== Current status ==
Since the construction of the new Karakoram Highway further south over the Khunjerab Pass, the pass has fallen out of use. As of late 2010s, on the Pakistani side, there are some trekking companies that offer tours to Kilik Pass. On the Chinese side, the entire valley around Kilik Pass is closed to visitors; however, local residents and herders from the area are permitted to access.

== See also ==
- China–Pakistan border
- Beyik Pass
- Tegermansu Pass
- Wakhjir Pass
- Mintaka Pass
- Chalachigu Valley
- Afghanistan–China_border
- China–Tajikistan border
