= Mintaka Pass =

Mountain pass between Gilgit-Baltistan and Xinjiang

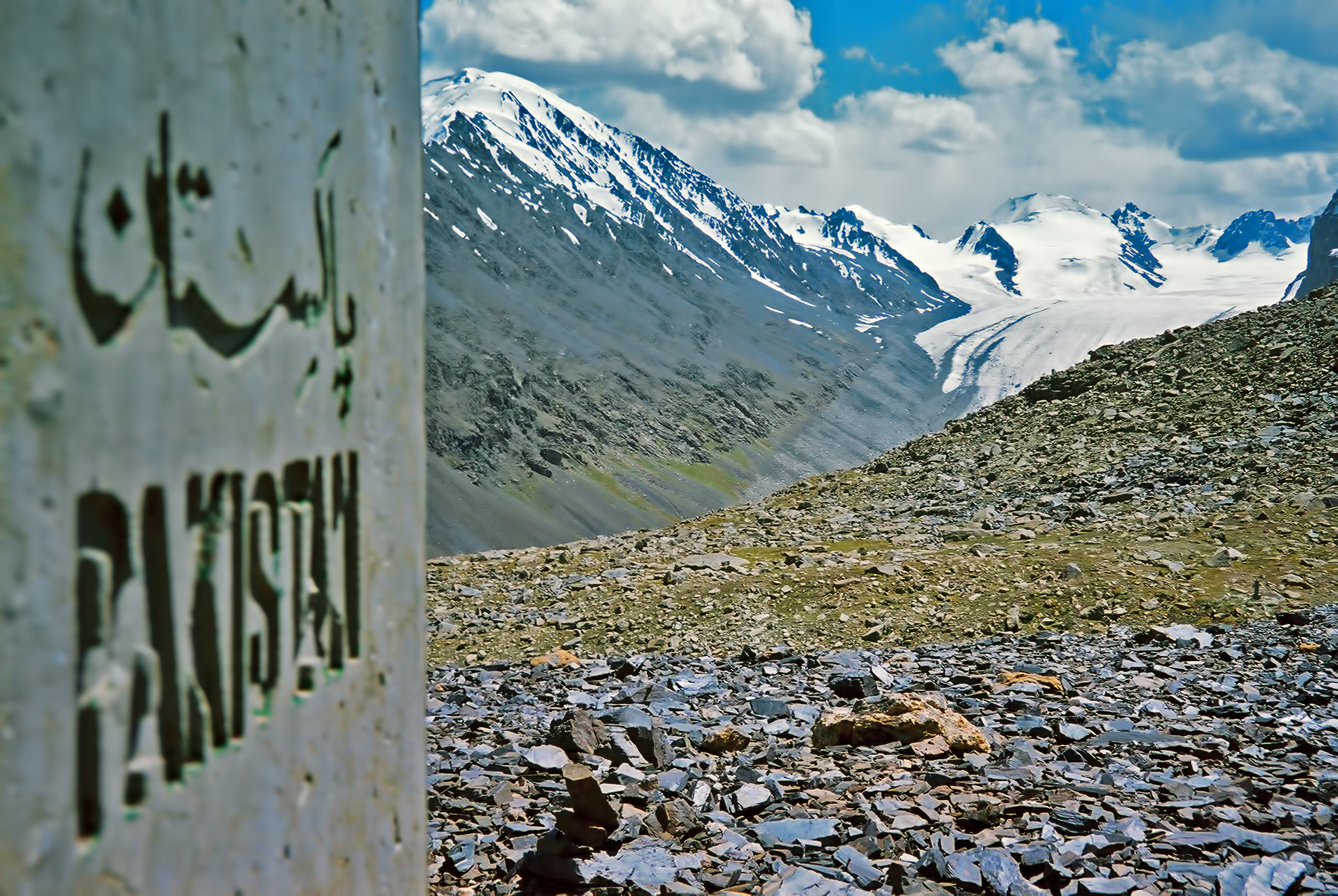
- A Pakistani border marker near Mintaka Pass

- Location within Southern Xinjiang Location within Gilgit Baltistan
- Interactive map of Mintaka Pass
- Elevation: 4,709 metres (15,449 ft)

Third Approach
- Location: China–Pakistan border
- Range: Karakorum Mountains
- Coordinates: 37.0039°N 74.8511°E

Mintaka Pass

Chinese name
- Traditional Chinese: 明鐵蓋達坂
- Simplified Chinese: 明铁盖达坂
Transcriptions
Standard Mandarin
- Hanyu Pinyin: míngtiěgě dábǎn

Uyghur name
- Uyghur: مىڭ تىكە داۋانى

Kyrgyz name
- Kyrgyz: مئڭ تەكە اشۇۇسۇ; Миң-теке ашуусу

The Mintaka Pass or Mingteke Pass or Mintika Pass (Chinese: 明铁盖达坂) is a mountain pass in the Karakorum Mountains, between northern Pakistan and Xinjiang in China. In ancient times, the Mintaka Pass and the nearby Kilik Pass, 30 km (19 mi) to the west, were the two main access points into Gojal (the upper Hunza Valley) from the north. The Hunza Valley is a mountainous valley near Gilgit in the Gilgit-Baltistan region of Pakistan. In addition, the two passes were also the routes used to reach Chalachigu Valley and Taghdumbash Pamir from the south. The name of the pass – Mintaka means "a thousand ibex" in Kyrgyz.

== History ==
During ancient times, Mintaka Pass and Kilik Pass were the shortest and quickest ways into Northern India from the Tarim Basin and were usually open all year, but extremely dangerous and only suited for travellers on foot. From Tashkurgan one travelled just over 70 km (43 mi) south to the junction of the Minteke River, modern day Chalachigu River. Heading some 80 km (50 mi) west up this valley one reached the Mintaka Pass, (and 30 km further, the alternative Kilik Pass), which both led into upper Hunza, from where one could travel over the infamous rafiqs or "hanging passages" to Gilgit and, from there, on to either Kashmir, or to the Gandharan plains.

Laden animals could be taken over the Mintaka and Kilik passes into upper Hunza (both open all year), but then loads would have to be carried by coolie (porters) to Gilgit (an expensive and dangerous operation). From there, cargoes could be reloaded onto pack animals again and taken either east to Kashmir and then on to Taxila (a long route), or west to Chitral which provided relatively easy access to either Jalalabad, or Peshawar via Swat.

The "Sacred Rock of Hunza" has numerous petroglyphs depicting mounted horseman and ibex along with Kharoshthi inscriptions that mention Saka and Pahlava rulers. Historians assess that Maues must have used the Karakorum route via Mintaka or Kilik passes to capture Taxila in the first century BCE.

Mintaka Pass was the main route used until the recent advance of glaciers. After the glaciation of Mintaka Pass, Kilik Pass has been favoured by caravans coming from China and Afghanistan as it is wider, free of glaciers and has enough pasture for caravan animals.

== Current status ==
In 1966, when the Karakoram Highway connecting Pakistan and China was being constructed, Pakistan initially favored routing through Mintaka Pass. However, China, citing the fact that Mintaka was more susceptible to air strikes, recommended the steeper and higher Khunjerab Pass instead. Eventually, the new Karakoram Highway was built through the Khunjerab Pass.

As of late 2010s, on the Pakistani side, there are some trekking companies that offer tours to Mintaka Pass. On the Chinese side, the entire valley around Mintaka Pass is closed to visitors; however, local residents and herders from the area are permitted to access.

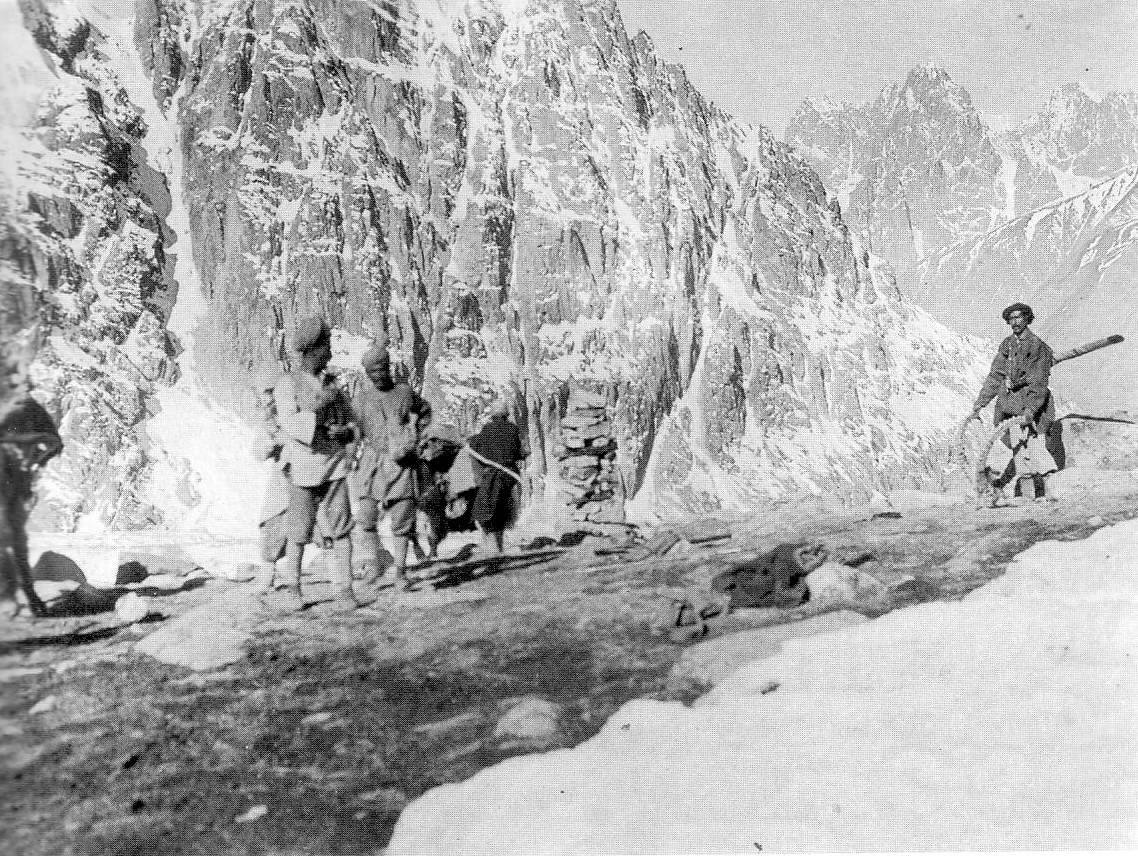
Summit of Mintaka Pass. 1918

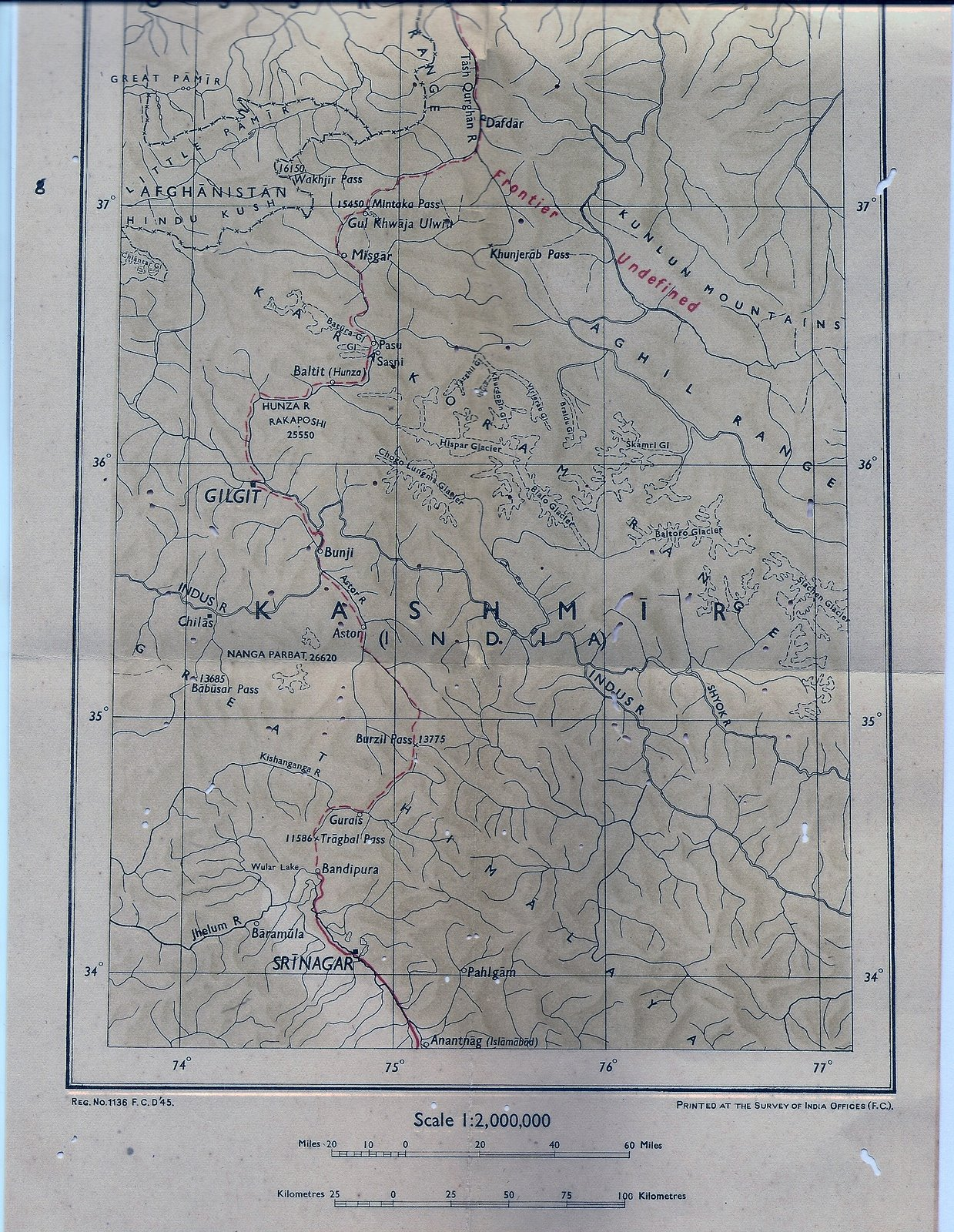
A pre-1947 Indian map showing Mintaka Pass as the primary thoroughfare

== See also ==
- China–Pakistan border
- Beyik Pass
- Tegermansu Pass
- Wakhjir Pass
- Kilik Pass
- Chalachigu Valley
- Afghanistan–China_border
- China–Tajikistan border
