= Murghob District =

Murghob District Tajik: Ноҳияи Мурғоб
- District
- Ноҳияи Мурғоб
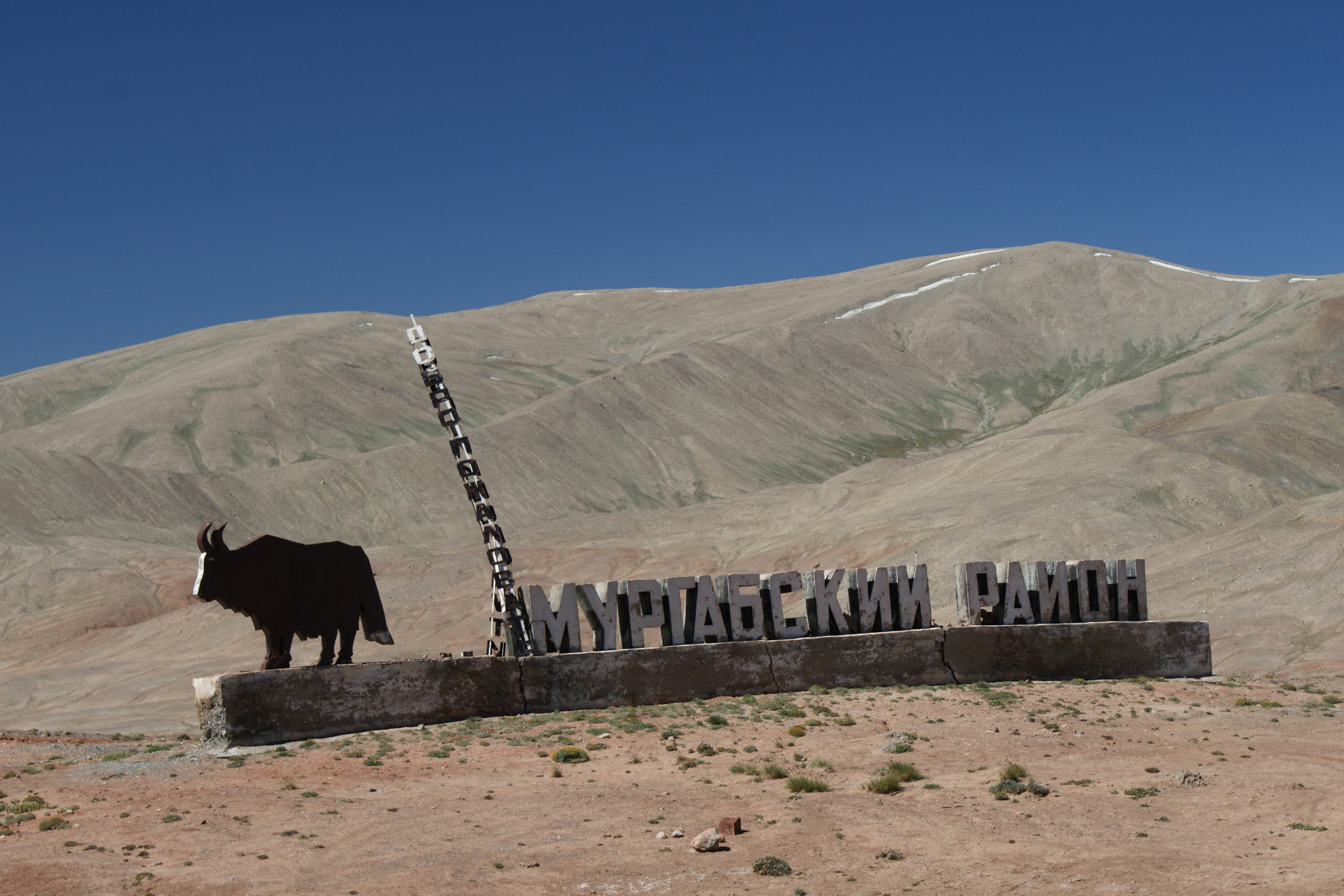

- Location of Murghob District in Tajikistan
- Coordinates: 38°10′N 73°55′E
- Country: Tajikistan
- Region: Gorno-Badakhshan Autonomous Region
- Established: 27 October 1932
- Capital: Murghob

Area
  - Total: 37,300 km^{2} (14,400 sq mi)

Population (2020)
  - Total: 15,900
  - Density: 0.426/km^{2} (1.10/sq mi)
- Time zone: UTC+5 (TJT)
- Postal code: 736600
- Area code: +992 3554
- Official languages: Russian (Interethnic); Tajik (State)

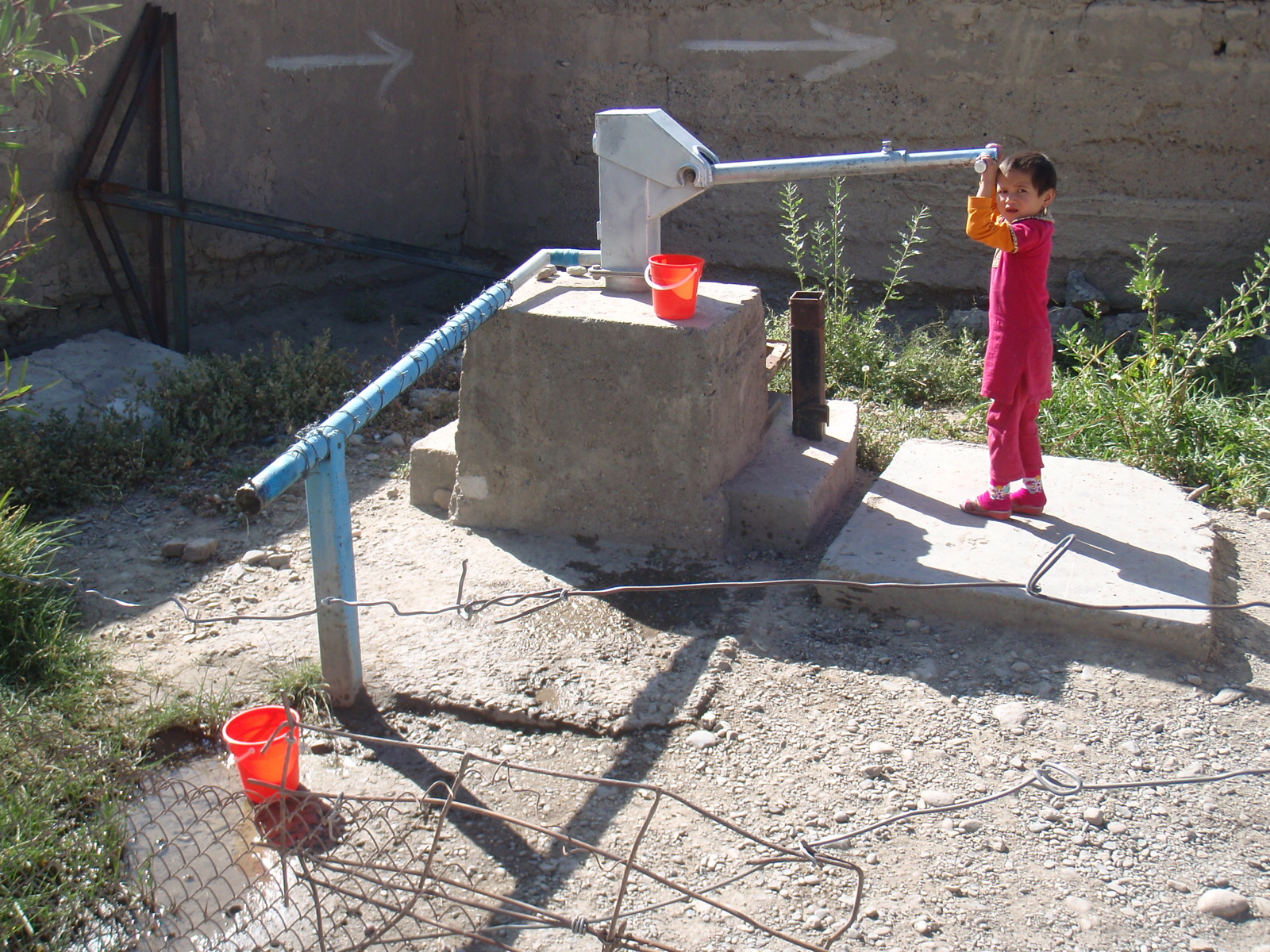
Pumping Water in Murghob

Murghob District (Tajik: Ноҳияи Мурғоб) is a district in Tajikistan, occupying the eastern two-thirds of the Gorno-Badakhshan Autonomous Region (GBAO). The area of Murghob District is 37,300 km^{2}, covering 26 percent of Tajikistan's soil, but only 0.17% of its population. Murghob District borders on Kyrgyzstan to the north, China to the east, and Afghanistan to the south. The population of Murghob District is 15,900 (1 January 2020 estimate). Its administrative capital is the village Murghob (also known as Murghab).

== Demographics ==
The estimated population of the district is around 15,900 as of 2020. According to 2015 data, the majority of the population are Kyrgyz (around 80%) while a minority are Pamiris (estimated at 20% of the population).

== Administrative divisions ==
The district is divided administratively into six jamoats. They are as follows:

Jamoat	Population (Jan. 2015)
Alichur	2,242
Gozho Berdiboev	1,368
Karakul	757
Murghob	7,468
Qizilrabot	1,675
Rangkul	1,569

== Geography ==
It borders Afghanistan to the south, China's Xinjiang region to the east, and Kyrgyzstan to the north. Within Tajikistan it is bordered to the west by four other GBAO districts and the Region of Republican Subordination.

The land is mostly a desolate plateau with scattered mountains, especially toward the east and south. The highest mountains are around the Fedchenko Glacier in the northwest and along the Pamir River in the south. The population consists of around 65% Kyrgyz who migrated to the Pamirs in the late XIII century, and the rest are Pamiris who are indigenous people of the Tajik and Chinese Pamir Region. Formerly the highlands was used by both ethnicities mostly as summer pasture. The Pamir Highway curves from the southwest to the northeast. The four major lakes are Karakul in the northeast and three river lakes: Sarez Lake on the river Bartang, Yashil Kul on the river Gunt, and Zorkul on the Pamir River.

The district's eastern border shares the Sarikol Range with China.

== See also ==
- China–Tajikistan border
- Rangkul Valley Important Bird Area
