= Karachukar Valley =

Valley in Xinjiang, China

- Chalachigu Valley
- Location within Southern Xinjiang Location within China
- Floor elevation: 4,100 m (13,500 ft)

Geography
- Location: Taxkorgan Tajik Autonomous County, Kashgar Prefecture, Xinjiang, China
- Coordinates: 37°9′N 74°42′E
- Rivers: Karachukar River
- Interactive map of Karachukar Valley

Karachukar Valley (Note: Alternative spellings: Karachikar and Karachukur) or Chalachigu Valley (Chinese: 卡拉其古河谷) is a valley in Taxkorgan Tajik Autonomous County, Xinjiang, China. It contains the basin of the Karachukar River, a tributary of the Tashkurgan River, and is regarded as part of Taghdumbash Pamir. The valley borders Afghanistan (Wakhan Corridor or Little Pamir) to the west and northwest, Tajikistan to the north, and Pakistan (Gojal or upper Hunza) to the south. The name of the valley is from Kyrgyz, meaning "black cave".

The valley is part of the Taxkorgan Nature Reserve. The protected Marco Polo sheep is only found in the wild around this area. The region is often referred to by the Chinese as the Chinese portion of the Wakhan Corridor. There is an ethnic Kyrgyz village called Bayik (Chinese: 排依克村 or Chinese: 阿特加依里村).

The entire Chalachigu Valley is closed to visitors. However, local residents and herders from the area are permitted access.

In March 2017, CCTV-7's Documentary for Military program produced a mini-series covering the numerous border outposts in Chalachigu Valley. In 2025, the border was found by an Austrian journalist to have been fenced over by China.

== Mountain passes ==
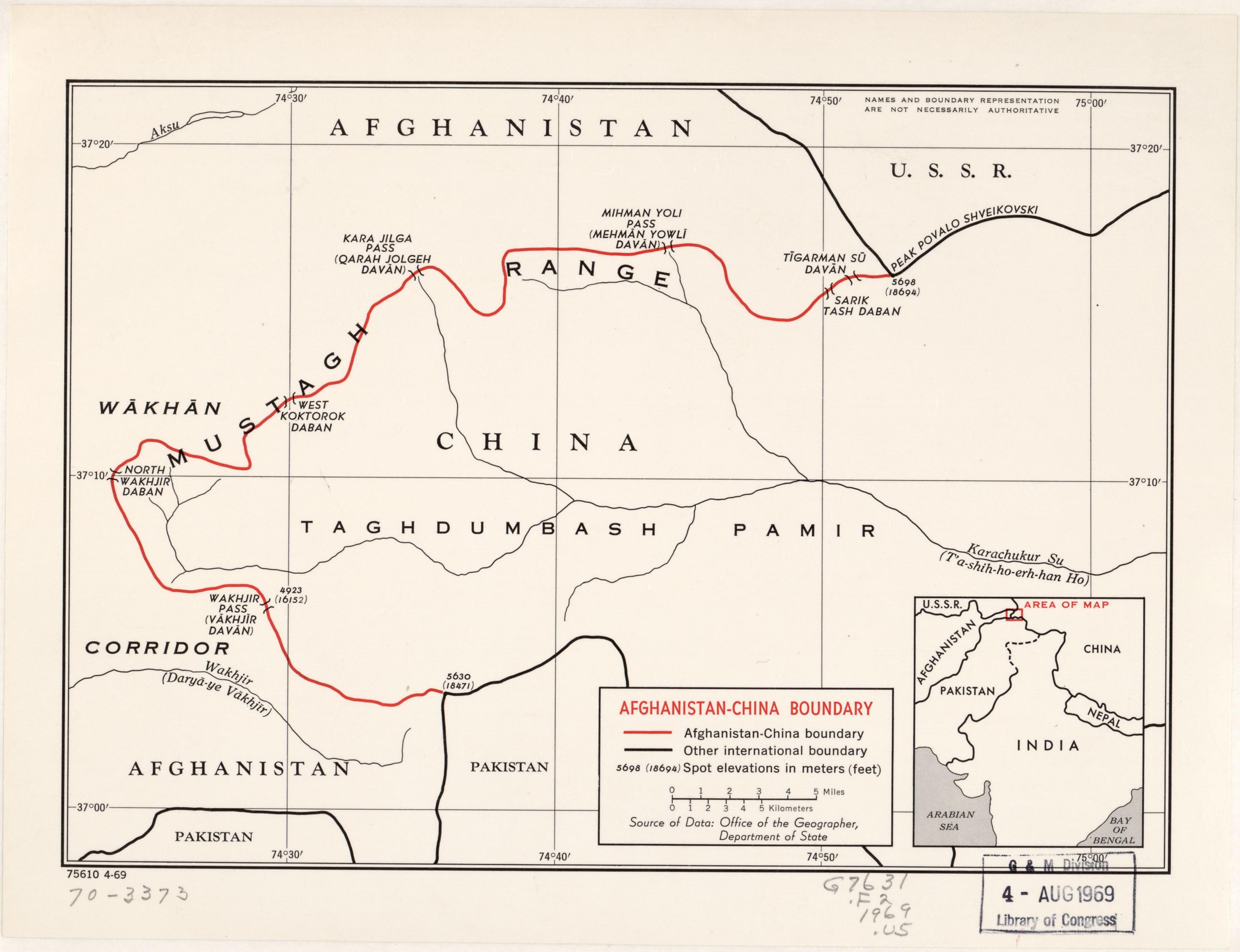
The western section of the Karachukar Valley

Chalachigu Valley

Chinese name
- Traditional Chinese: 卡拉其古河谷
- Simplified Chinese: 卡拉其古河谷
- Hanyu Pinyin: Kǎlāqígǔ xiágǔ
Transcriptions
Standard Mandarin
- Hanyu Pinyin: Kǎlāqígǔ xiágǔ

Karachukur Valley
- Traditional Chinese: 喀拉其庫爾河谷
- Simplified Chinese: 喀拉其库尔河谷
- Hanyu Pinyin: Kālāqíkùěr hégǔ
Transcriptions
Standard Mandarin
- Hanyu Pinyin: Kālāqíkùěr hégǔ

Uyghur name
- Uyghur: قاراچۇقار جىلغىسى

Kyrgyz name
- Kyrgyz: قاراچۇقار ۅرۅۅنۉ

The valley was a significant thoroughfare of the Silk Road during ancient times. Around the valley are numerous passes connecting to other countries:

- Tajikistan - Beyik Pass
- Afghanistan - Wakhjir Pass, Tegermansu Pass
- Pakistan - Kilik Pass, Mintaka Pass

Of the above passes, it is believed that the famous Chinese Buddhist pilgrim Xuanzang traveled through Wakhjir Pass on his return trip back to China around 649 AD. Some Chinese historians argue that he also used Beyik Pass on his way to India.

== See also ==
- Afghanistan–China border
- China–Pakistan border
- China–Tajikistan border
- Dafdar
