= Murghob =

Town in Gorno-Badakhshan, Tajikistan

Murghob Мурғоб (Tajik) Мургаб (Russian) Murghab
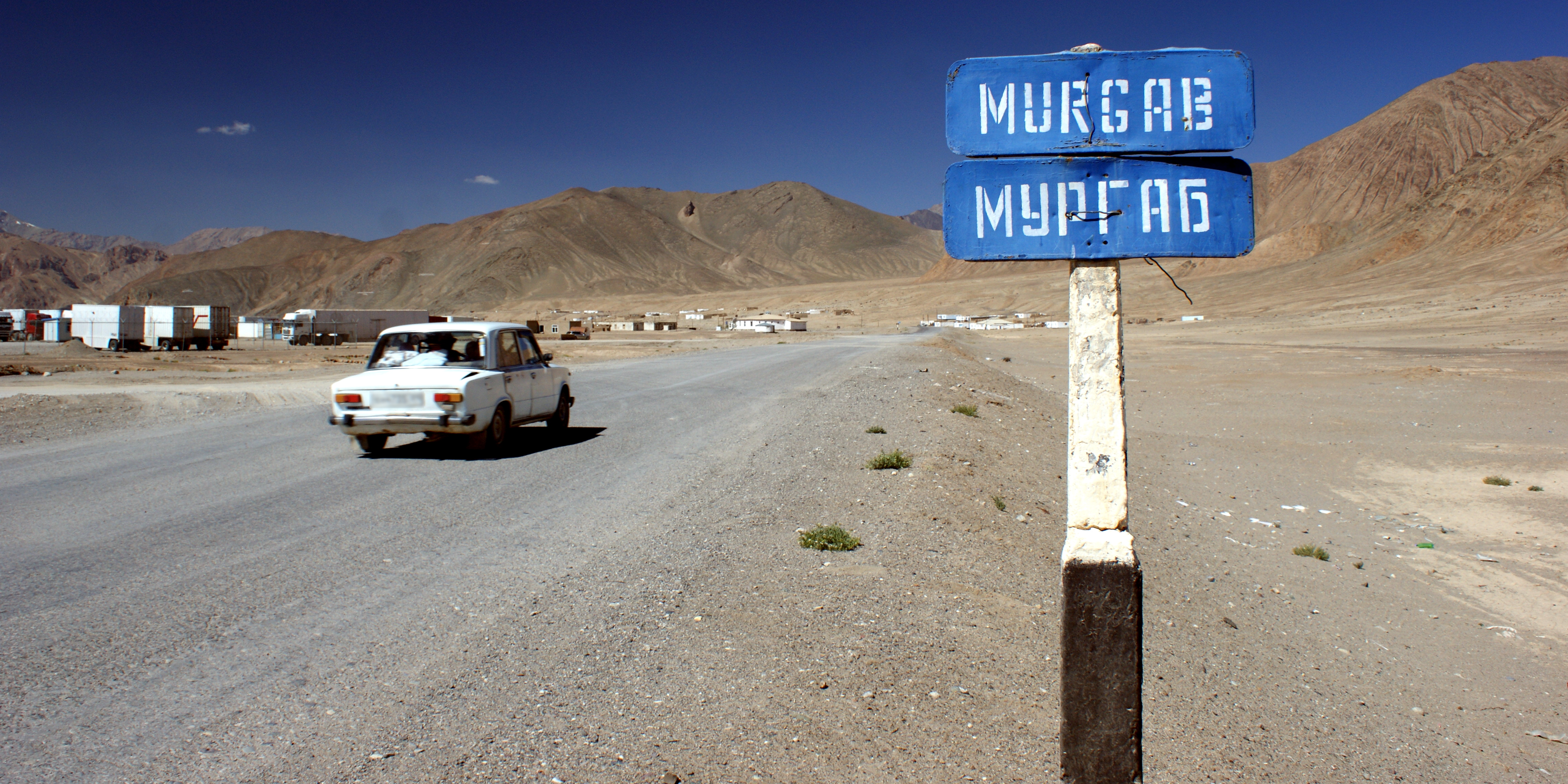

- Location in Tajikistan
- Coordinates: 38°10′08″N 73°57′54″E
- Country: Tajikistan
- Region: Gorno-Badakhshan
- District: Murghob District
- Elevation: 3,618 m (11,869 ft)

Population (2015)
  - Total: 7,468
- Time zone: UTC+5

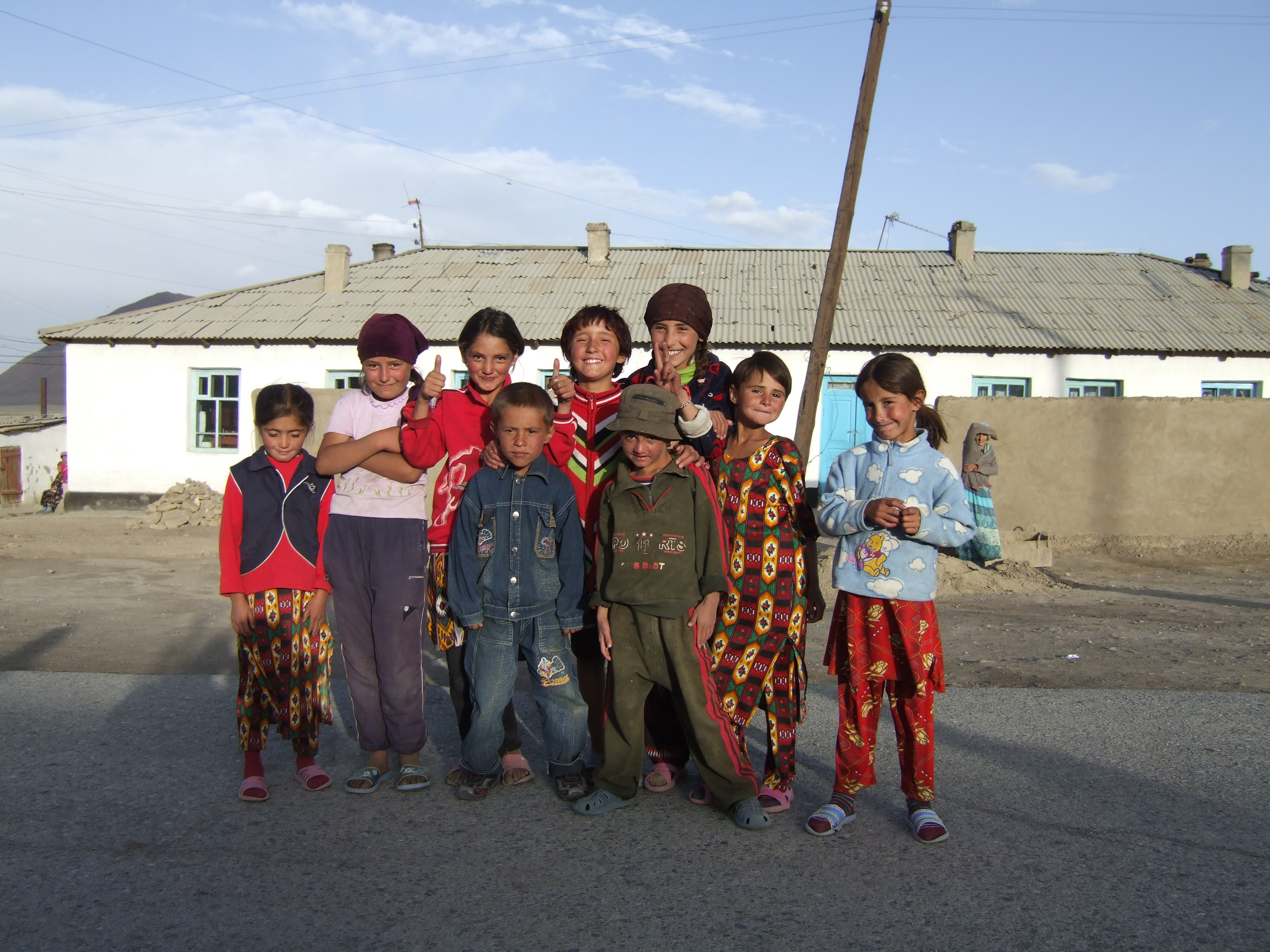
Children in Murghob, 2008

Murghob (Tajik: Мурғоб) or Murghab (Russian: Мургаб, Murgab, from the Persian word margh-ab, meaning 'prairie river') is the capital of Murghob District in the Pamir Mountains of Gorno-Badakhshan, Tajikistan. With a population of just under 7,500, Murghob is the only significant town in the eastern half of Gorno-Badakhshan. It is the highest town in Tajikistan (and of the former Soviet Union) at 3,650 meters above sea level. It is where the Pamir Highway crosses the Bartang river.

The Pamir Highway goes north to Sary-Tash and on to Osh in Kyrgyzstan and southwest to the region's capital Khorugh. Another road goes east over the Kulma Pass to the Karakoram Highway in China connecting to Tashkurgan to the south and Kashgar to the north.

== History ==
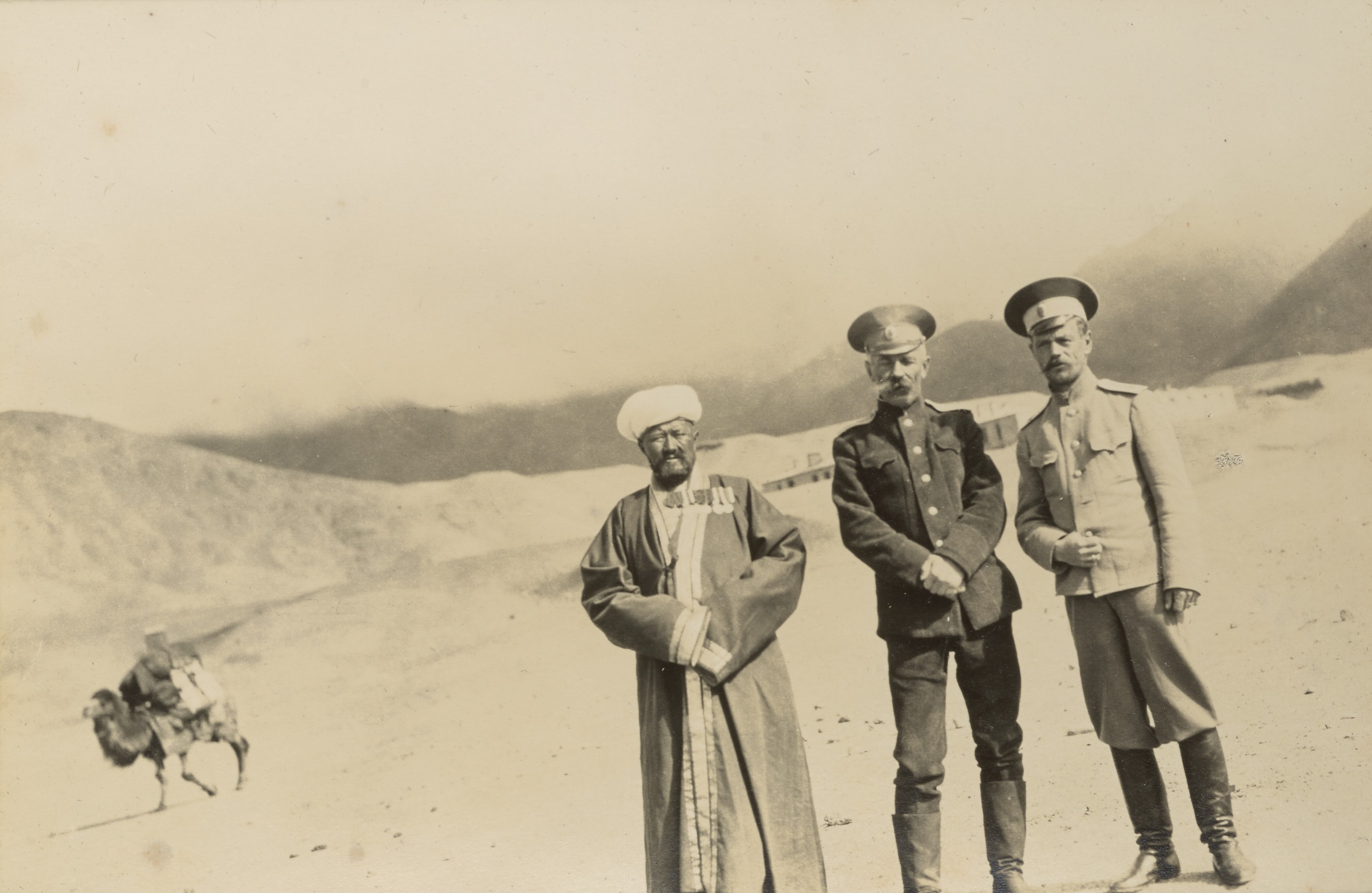
Russian officials standing in front of Pamirsky Post, 1915

From 1892 to 1893, a fortification named Shadzhansky Post (Russian: Шаджанский пост) existed on the site of the current town of Murghob. Some historical records attest that, in 1893, the Imperial Russian Army established Pamirsky Post (Russian: Памирский пост, lit. 'Pamir post') in the area as the main Russian fortification in the Pamir Mountains. It was to be their most advanced military outpost into Central Asia. Other records published much later state that Pamirsky Post was actually established elsewhere on 26 July 1903, as a new barracks near the village of Kuni Kurgan.

The modern town of Murghob was constructed during the period of Soviet rule in Tajikistan as a rest stop along the Pamir Highway. The old Soviet outpost closed in 2002, causing economic hardship partially offset by a rise in tourism.

== Climate ==
Murghob has an alpine tundra climate (ET) in the Köppen climate classification. The average annual temperature is −3.9 °C (25.0 °F). The warmest month is July with an average temperature of 8.7 °C (47.7 °F) and the coolest month is January with an average temperature of −18.7 °C (−1.7 °F). The average annual precipitation is 347.7 mm (13.69 in) and has an average of 87.1 days with precipitation. The wettest month is May with an average of 45.1 mm (1.78 in) of precipitation and the driest month is September with an average of 10.9 mm (0.43 in) of precipitation.

Climate data for Murghob
Month	Jan	Feb	Mar	Apr	May	Jun	Jul	Aug	Sep	Oct	Nov	Dec	Year
Daily mean °C (°F)	−18.7 (−1.7)	−16.8 (1.8)	−9.9 (14.2)	−2.7 (27.1)	0.8 (33.4)	5.1 (41.2)	8.7 (47.7)	8.5 (47.3)	4.0 (39.2)	−2.2 (28.0)	−9.0 (15.8)	−14.7 (5.5)	−3.9 (25.0)
Average precipitation mm (inches)	27.6 (1.09)	29.4 (1.16)	40.2 (1.58)	38.4 (1.51)	45.1 (1.78)	28.4 (1.12)	22.0 (0.87)	19.9 (0.78)	10.9 (0.43)	22.8 (0.90)	29.4 (1.16)	33.6 (1.32)	347.7 (13.69)
Average precipitation days (≥ 0.1 mm)	6.6	7.7	8.7	9.0	11.0	9.0	8.4	6.5	5.0	4.9	4.6	5.7	87.1
Average relative humidity (%)	59.5	60.2	56.0	52.0	50.1	43.1	43.4	44.8	43.5	45.9	49.7	56.3	50.4
Source: "Climate of Murghob". Weatherbase.
