= China–Tajikistan border =

International border

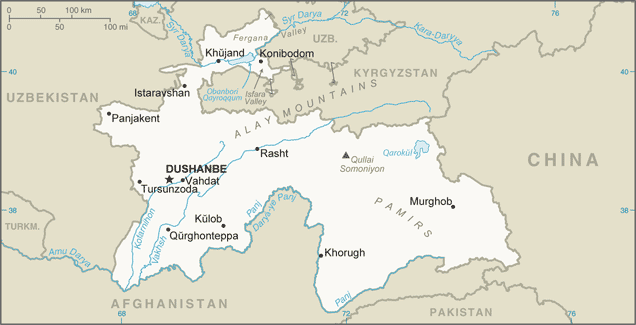
Map of Tajikistan showing the border with China

Chinese and Tajik boundary markers

The China–Tajikistan border is 477 km (296 mi) in length and runs from the tripoint with Kyrgyzstan following a roughly north–south line across various mountain ridges and peaks of the Pamir range down to the tripoint with Afghanistan. The border divides Murghob District, Gorno-Badakhshan Autonomous Region in Tajikistan from Akto County, Kizilsu Kyrgyz Autonomous Prefecture (to the north) and Taxkorgan Tajik Autonomous County, Kashgar Prefecture (to the south) in Xinjiang Uygur Autonomous Region, China.

== History ==
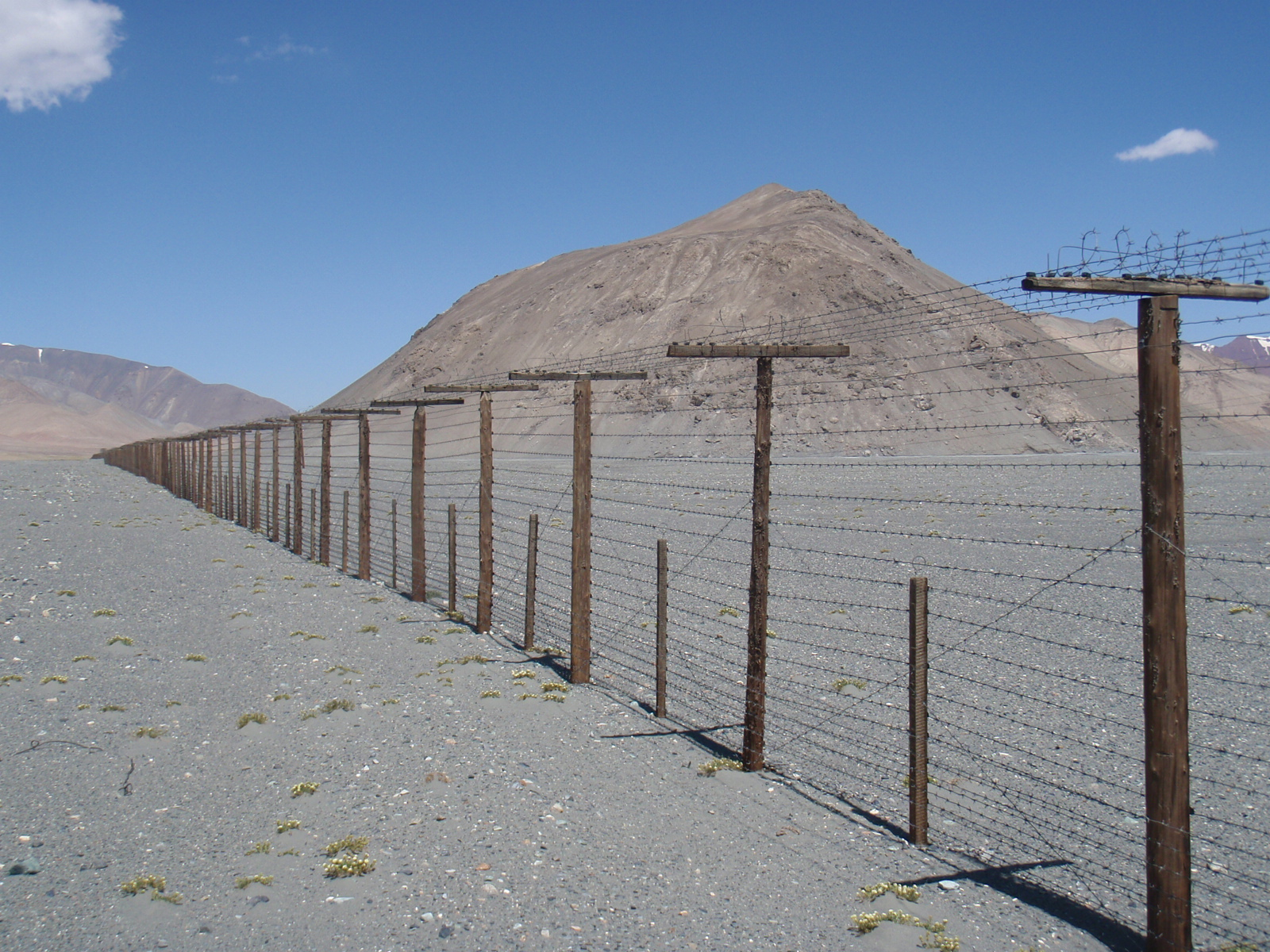
Border fence between China and Tajikistan

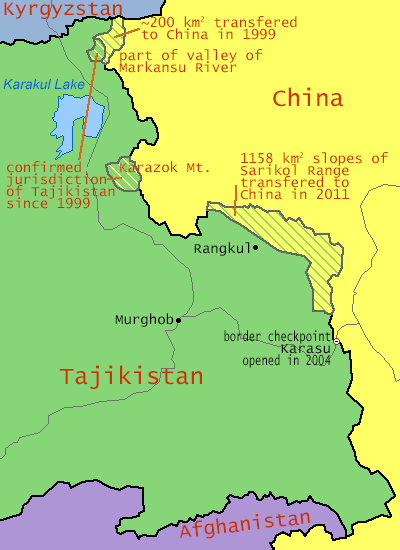
Changes in the boundary between China (yellow) and Tajikistan (green)

The origins of the border date from the mid-19th century, when the Russian empire expanded into Central Asia and established control over the Lake Zaysan region. The establishment of the border between the Russian Empire and the Qing Empire, not too different from today's Sino-Kazakh/Kyrgyz/Tajik border was provided for in the Convention of Peking of 1860; the actual border line pursuant to the convention was drawn by the Treaty of Tarbagatai (1864) and the Treaty of Uliassuhai (1870), leaving Lake Zaysan on the Russian side. The Qing Empire's military presence in the Irtysh basin crumbled during the Dungan revolt (1862–1877). After the failure of the rebellion and the reconquest of Xinjiang by Zuo Zongtang, the border between the Russian and the Qing empires in the Ili River basin was further slightly readjusted, in Russia's favour, by the Treaty of Saint Petersburg (1881) and a series of later protocols. In 1915 an agreement was signed more precisely delimiting the border between the Ili Valley and the Dzungarian Alatau region. The southernmost section of the frontier (i.e. roughly the southern half of the modern China–Tajikistan border) remained undemarcated, owing partly to the ongoing rivalry between Britain and Russia for dominance in Central Asia known as the Great Game; eventually the two agreed that Afghanistan would remain an independent buffer state between them, with Afghanistan's Wakhan Corridor being created in 1895. China was not a party to these agreements and hence the southernmost section of the China-Russia boundary remained undefined. When Tajikistan became independent in 1991 it inherited a section of the China-USSR frontier. That boundary followed the drainage basin divide between the Amu Darya and the Yarkand River until reaching Markansu.

In 2011, Tajikistan ratified a 1999 deal (and a 2002 supplementary agreement) to cede 200 and 1,122 km^{2} (77 and 433 sq mi) respectively of land in the Pamir Mountains to the People's Republic of China, ending a 130-year dispute. In the treaty, China also relinquished claims to over 28,000 km^{2} (11,000 sq mi) of Tajikistani territory. The Republic of China had historically made similar claims in the area. Tajik attitudes toward the boundary treaty varied significantly among different interest groups, ranging from overt opposition to overt support.

== Geography ==
A point north of the Markansu River (瑪爾坎蘇河) on the China–Tajikistan border is the westernmost point of China.

The border's southern terminus is found at the Afghanistan-China-Tajikistan tripoint on Povalo-Shveikovskogo Peak (Chinese: 波万洛什维科夫斯基峰; pinyin: Bōwànluò Shíwéikēfūsījī Fēng) / Kokrash Kol Peak (Kekelaqukaole Peak; Chinese: 克克拉去考勒峰; pinyin: Kèkèlāqùkǎolè Fēng) which is also the eastern end of the Afghanistan-Tajikistan border and the northern end of the Afghanistan-China border as well as the easternmost point of Afghanistan.

== Border crossings ==
The Karasu Port of Entry at the Kulma Pass (4,362.7 m (14,313 ft)) is the only modern day border crossing between China and Tajikistan. Historically, two passes further south along the border, Nezatash Pass and Beyik Pass, have also been traversed. Northwest of Kulma Pass is the Uzbel/Kyzyl-Dzhiik Pass (also known as Uzbel Shankou, Pereval Kyzyl-Dzhiik, Wuzibieli Pass (乌孜别里山口), Kizil Jik Dawan, Kizöl-jiik Pass, K'o-tse-lo-chi-k'o Shan-k'ou, Qizil Jik Dāwan, Utzupieli Pass and Wu-tzu-pieh-li Shan-k'ou).

== Historical maps ==
Historical English-language maps of the China-USSR (Tajik SSR) border area, mid to late 20th century, and historical maps including the pre-2011 China–Tajikistan border:

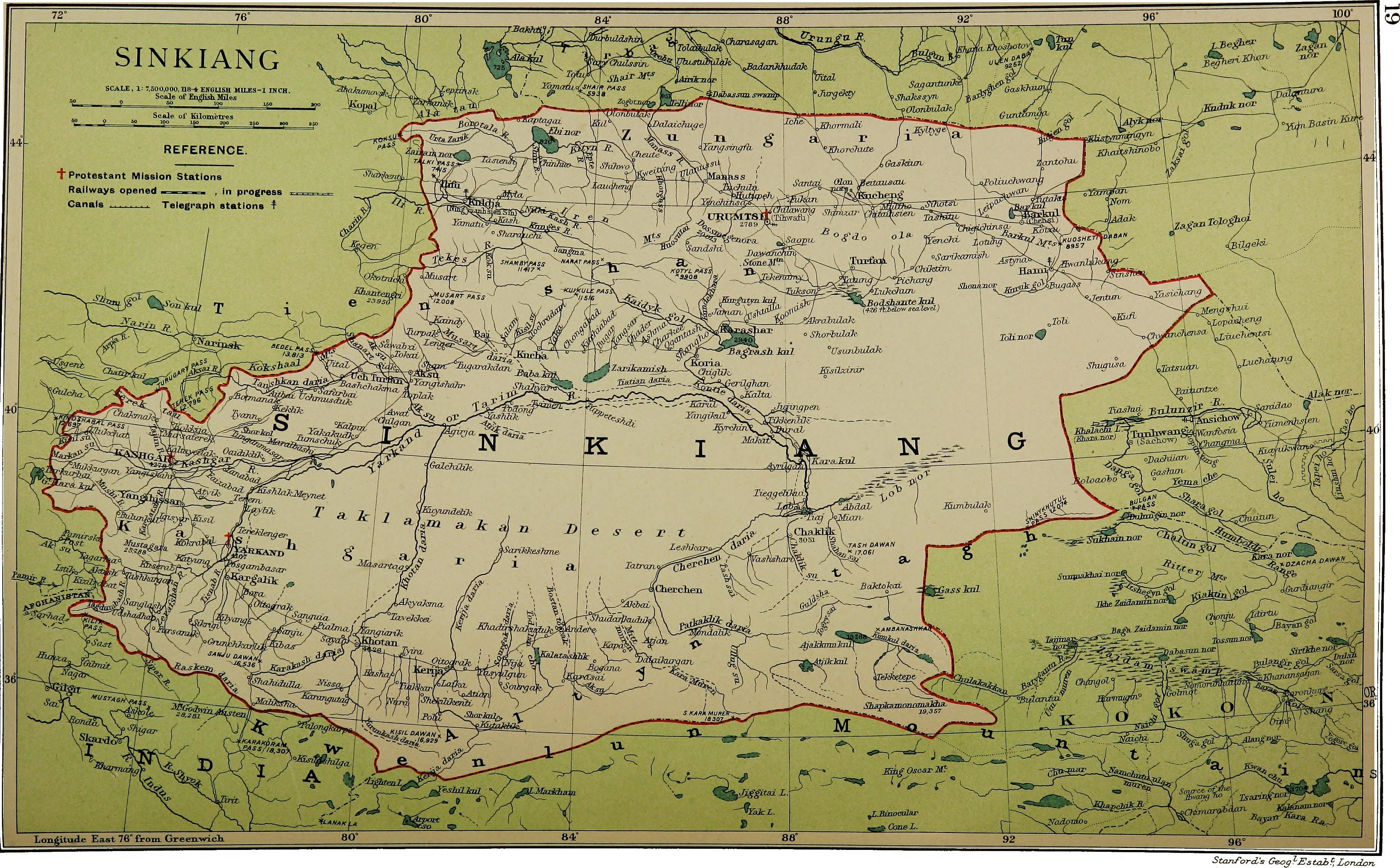
Map including the China-Russia border in the modern-day Tajikistan area (1917)

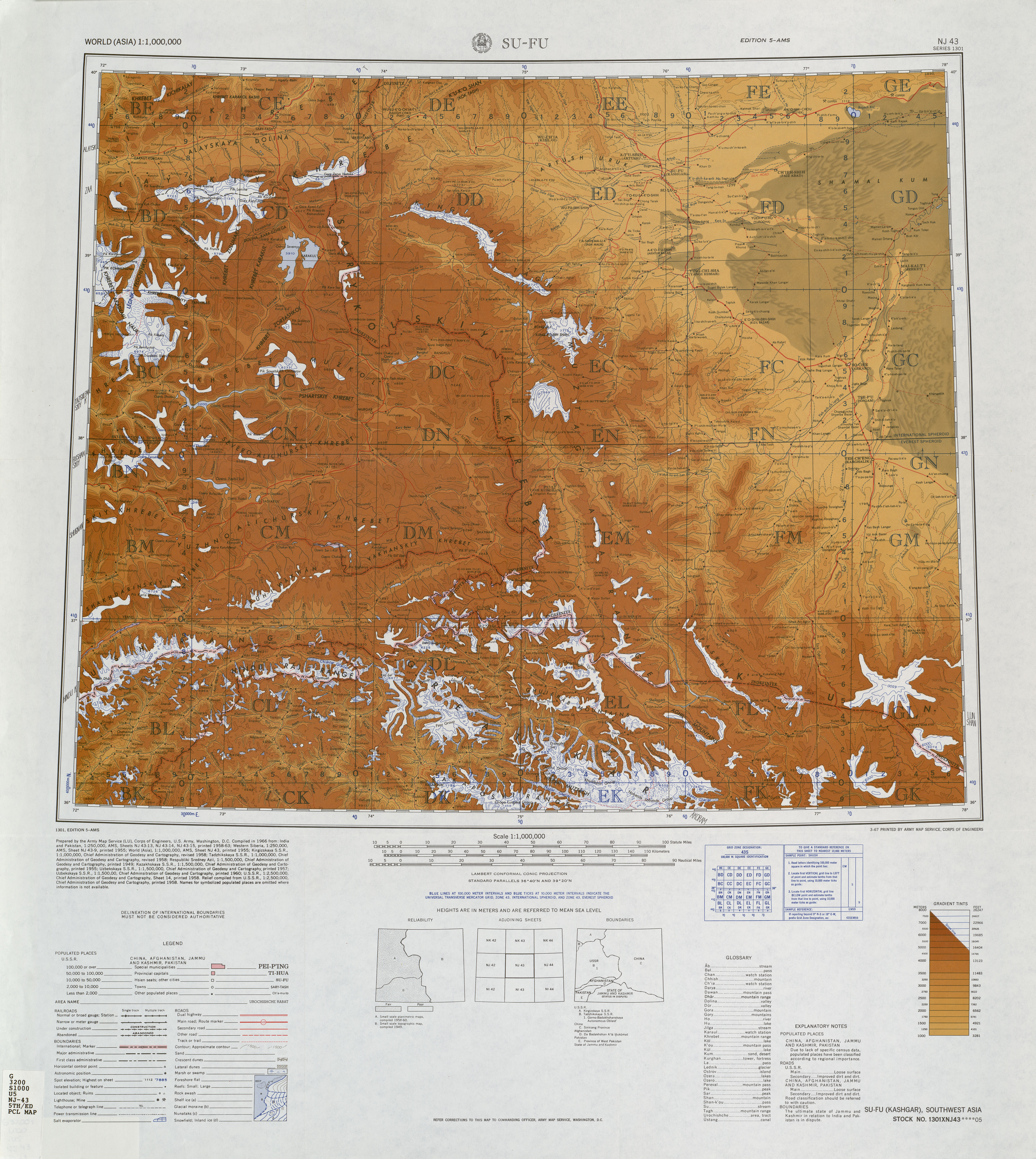
From the International Map of the World (AMS, 1966) (Note: From map: "DELINEATION OF INTERNATIONAL BOUNDARIES MUST NOT BE CONSIDERED AUTHORITATIVE")

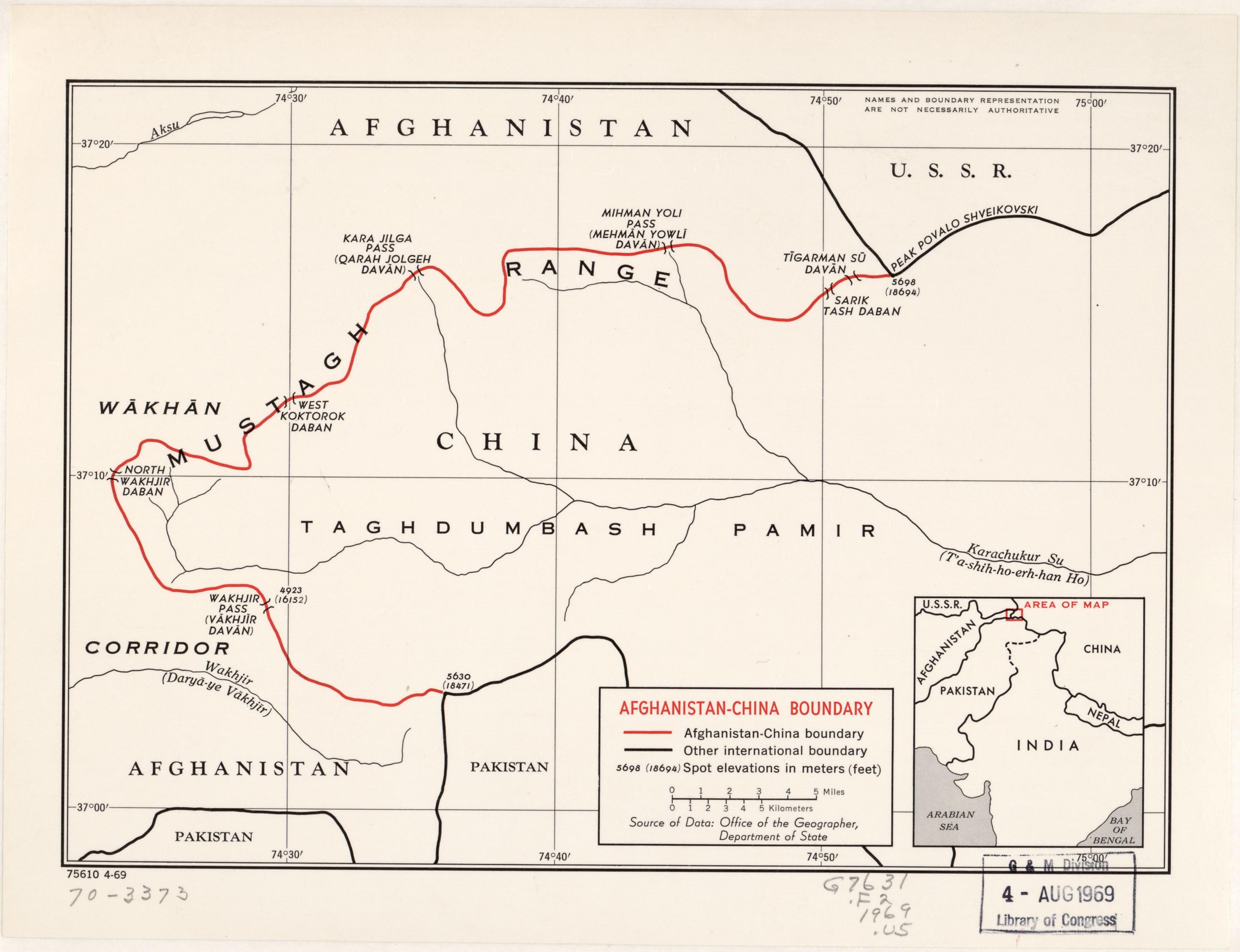
Map of Afghanistan-China Boundary (with the Afghanistan-China-USSR (Tajik SSR) tripoint labeled as PEAK POVALO SHVEIKOVSKI 5698 (18694)) (1969) (Note: From map: "NAMES AND BOUNDARY REPRESENTATION ARE NOT NECESSARILY AUTHORITATIVE")

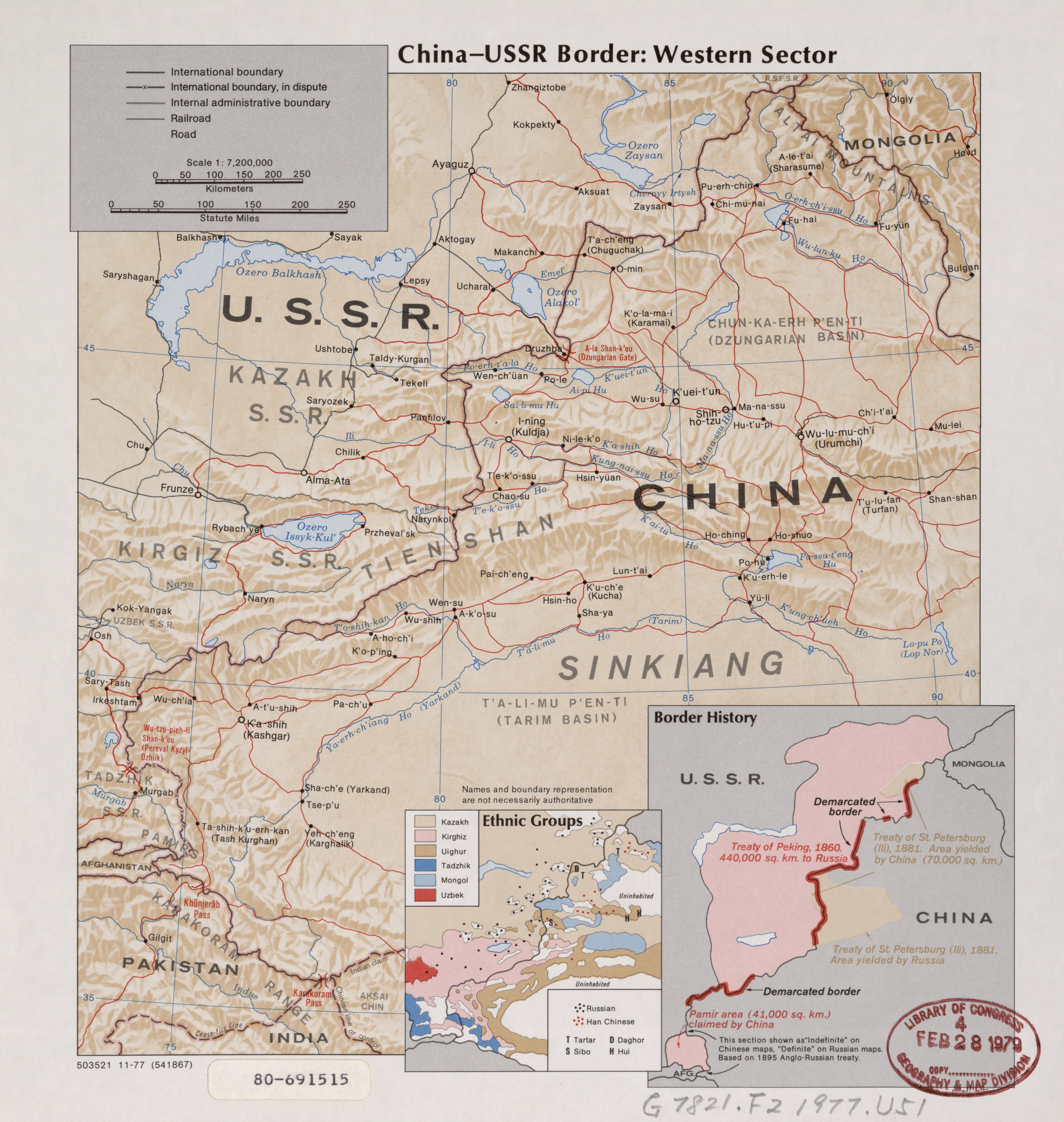
Map of the western China-USSR border showing the Pamir area (41,000 km^{2} (16,000 mi^{2})) claimed by China. "This section shown as 'Indefinite' on Chinese maps, 'Definite' on Russian maps. Based on 1895 Anglo-Russian treaty." (1977)

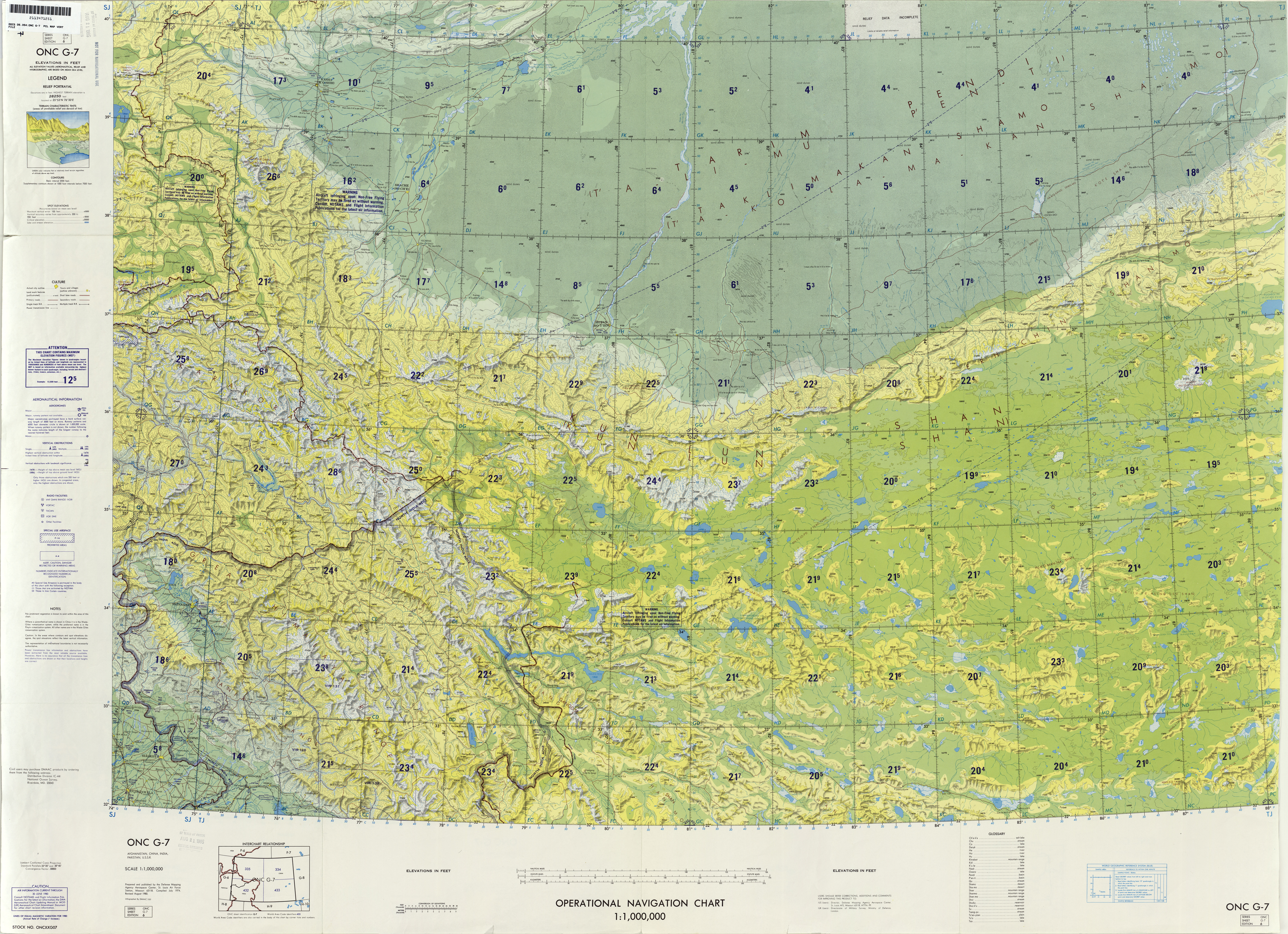
Border region (DMA, 1980) (Note: From map: "The representation of international boundaries is not necessarily authoritative.")

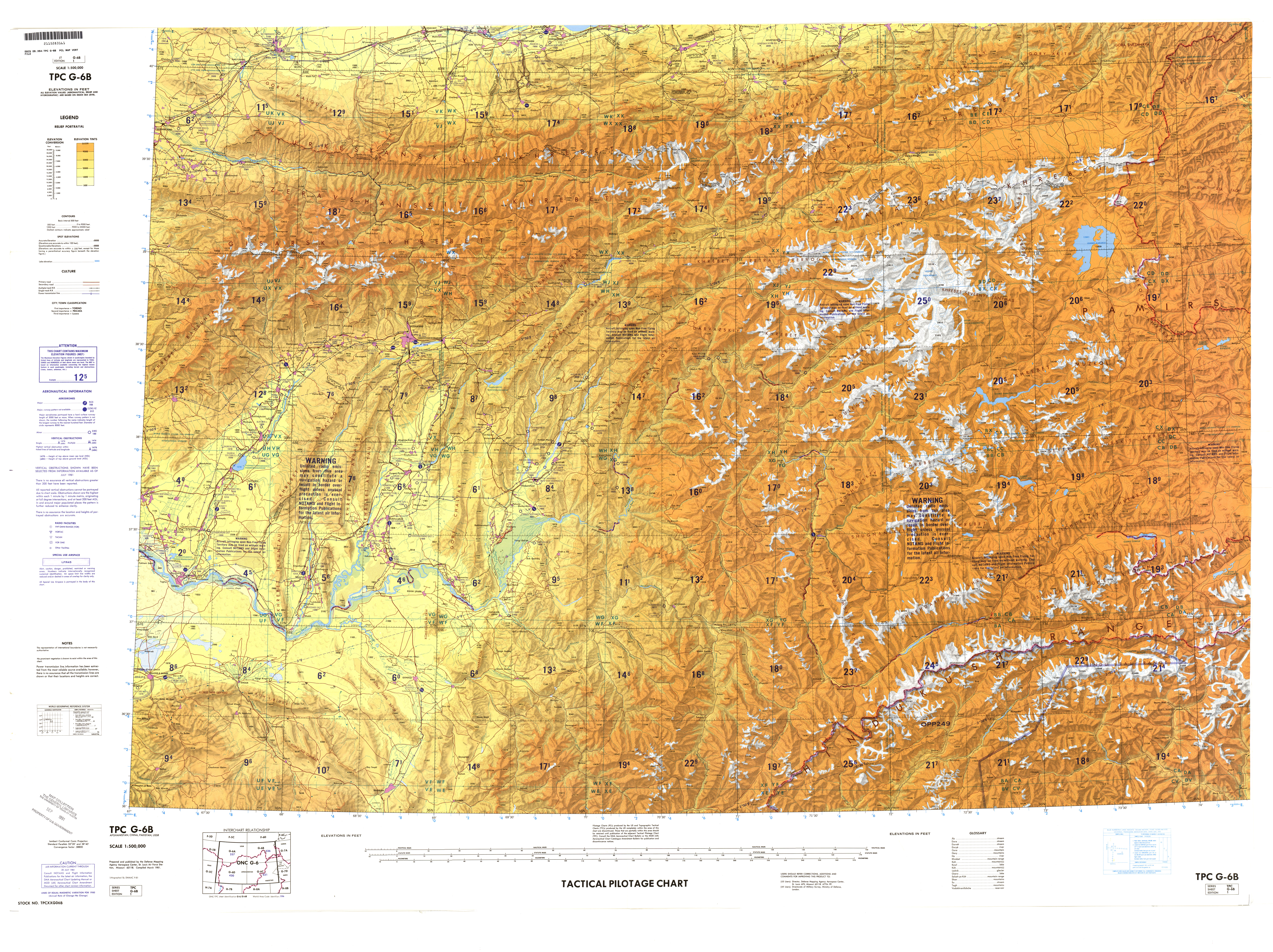
Northern/western section of the border (DMA, 1981) (Note: From map: "The representation of international boundaries is not necessarily authoritative")

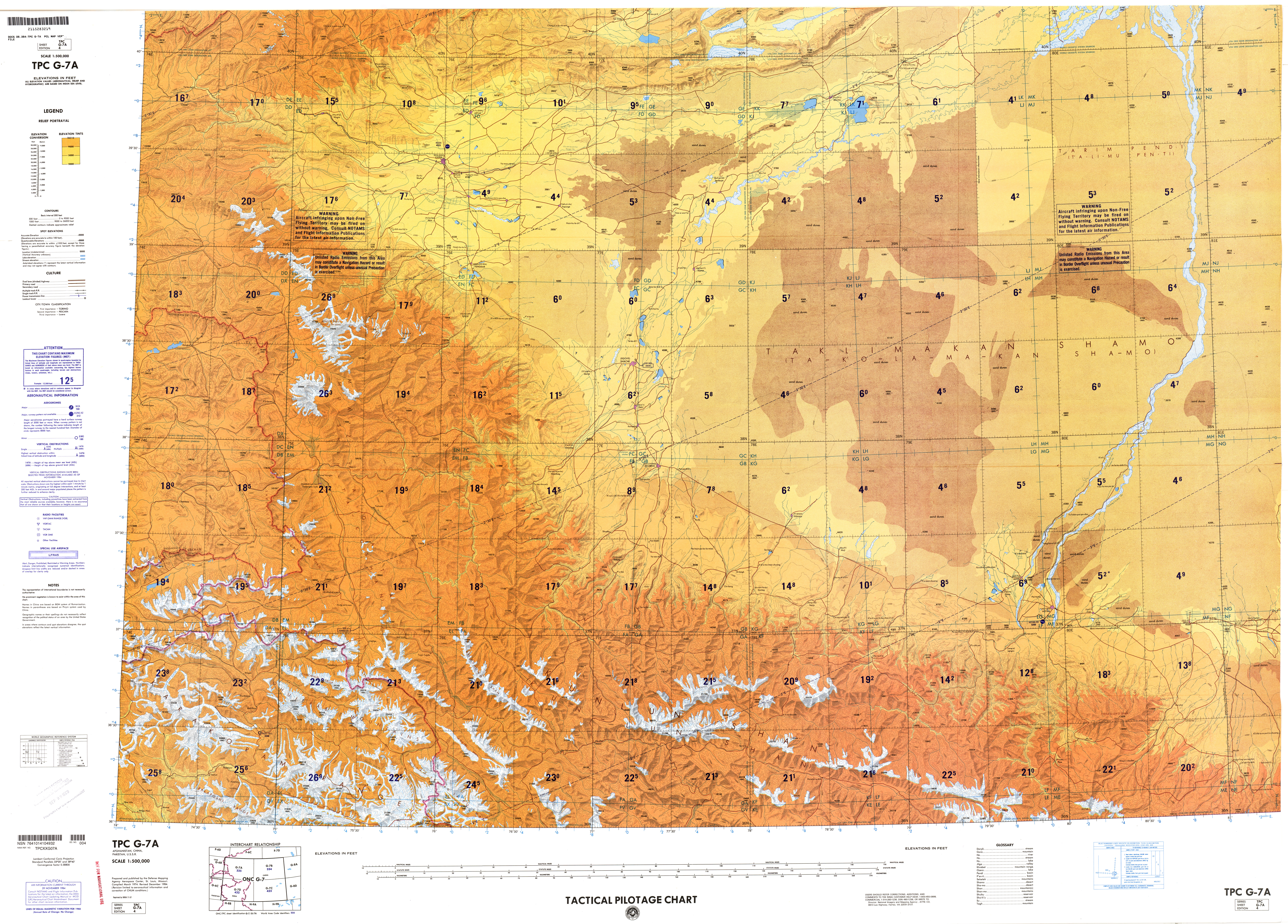
Southern/eastern section of the border (DMA, 1984) (Note: From map: "The representation of international boundaries is not necessarily authoritative")

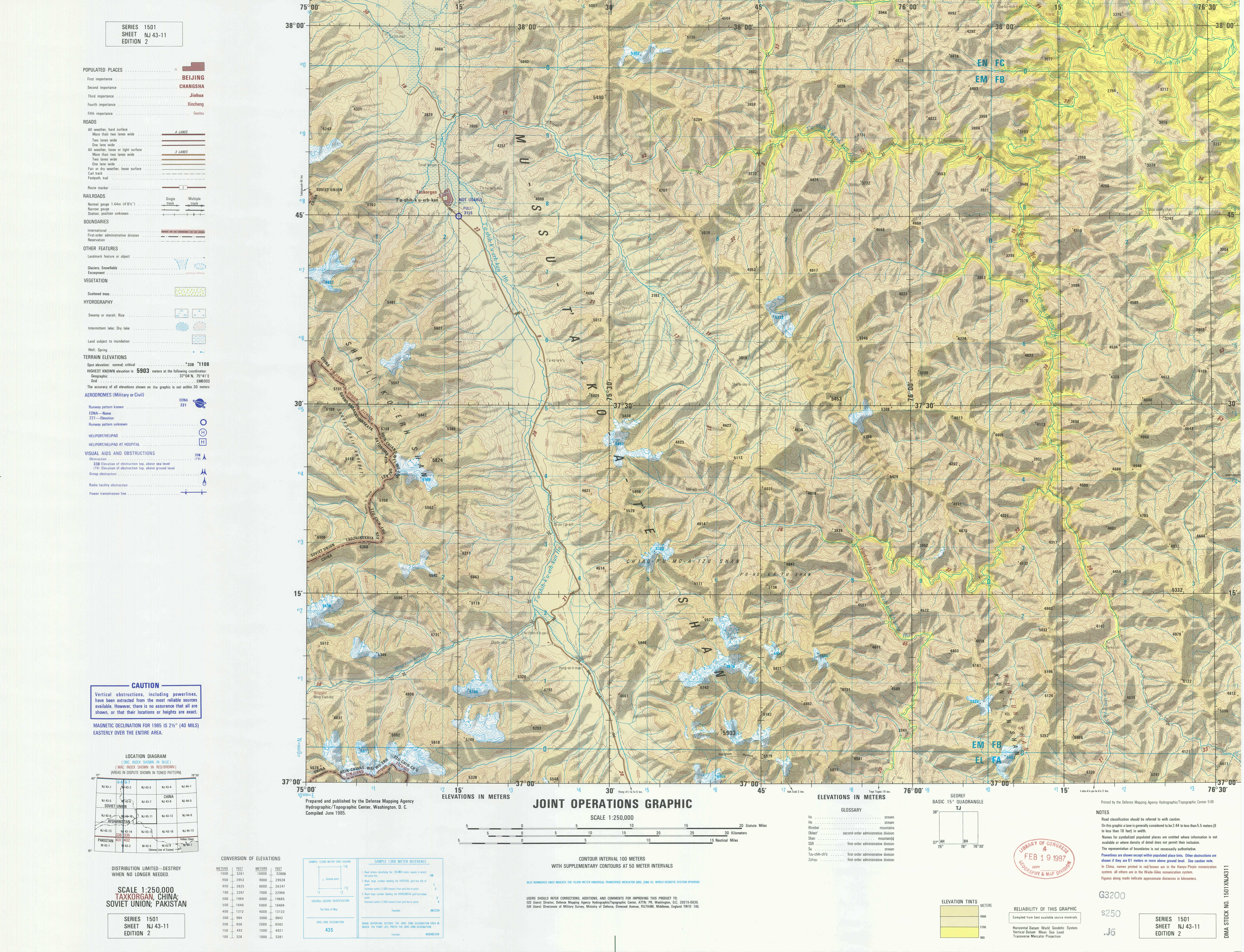
Map including part of the China-USSR (Tajik SSR) border near Taxkorgan (T'a-shih-k'u-erh-kan) (DMA, 1985)

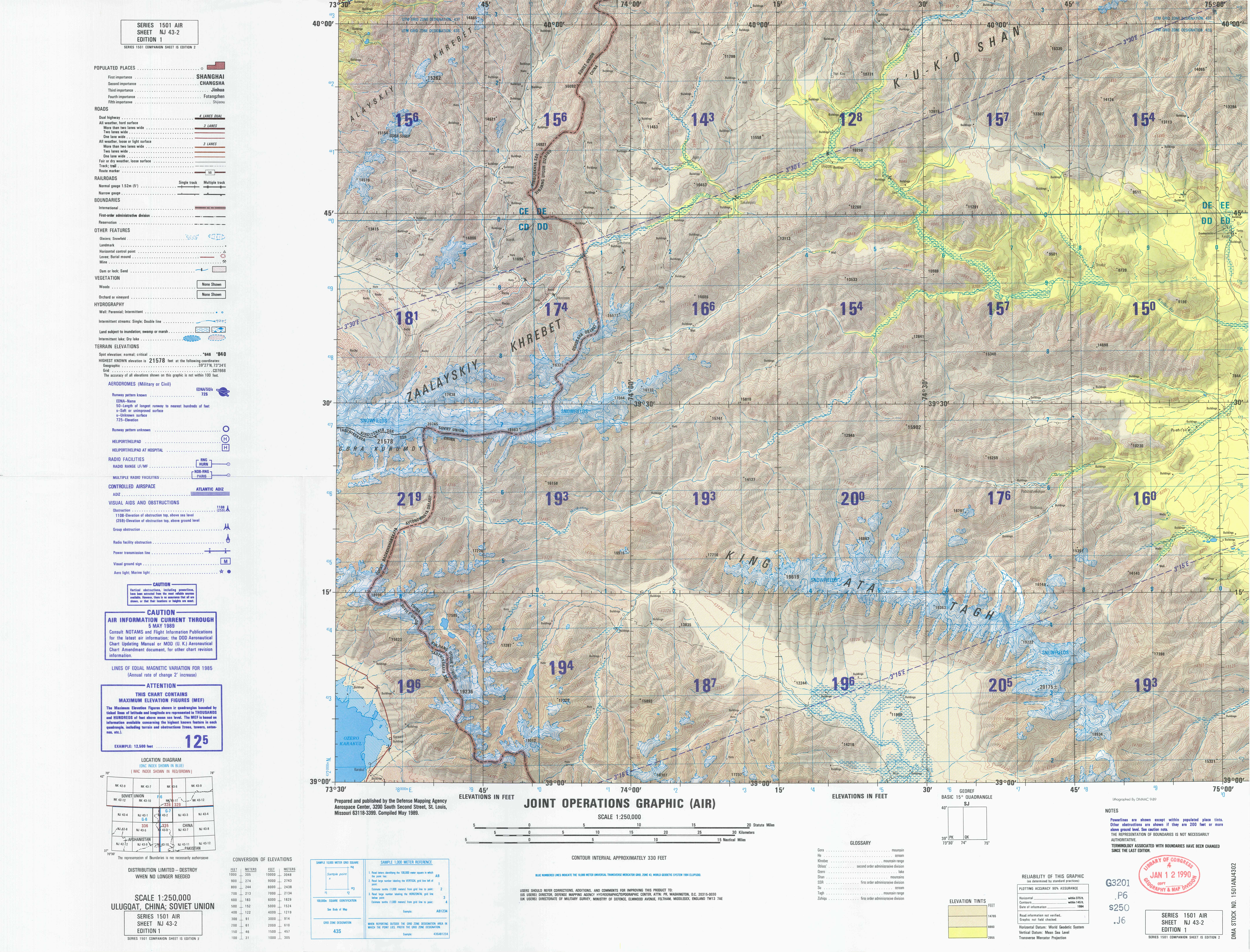
Portion of the China-USSR (Tajik SSR) border (DMA, 1989)

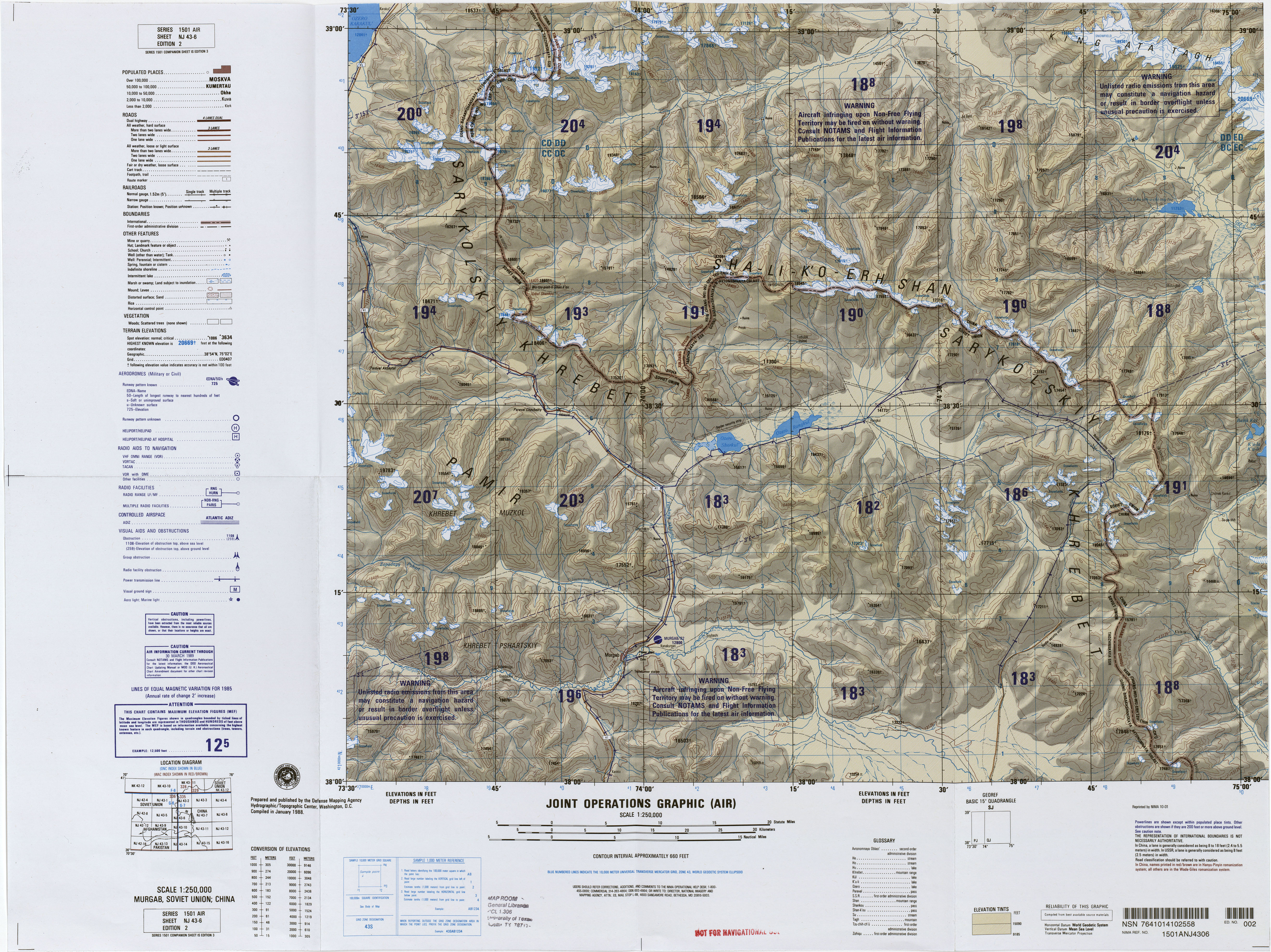
Portion of the China-USSR (Tajik SSR) border (DMA, 1988) (Note: From map: "THE REPRESENTATION OF INTERNATIONAL BOUNDARIES IS NOT NECESSARILY AUTHORITATIVE.")

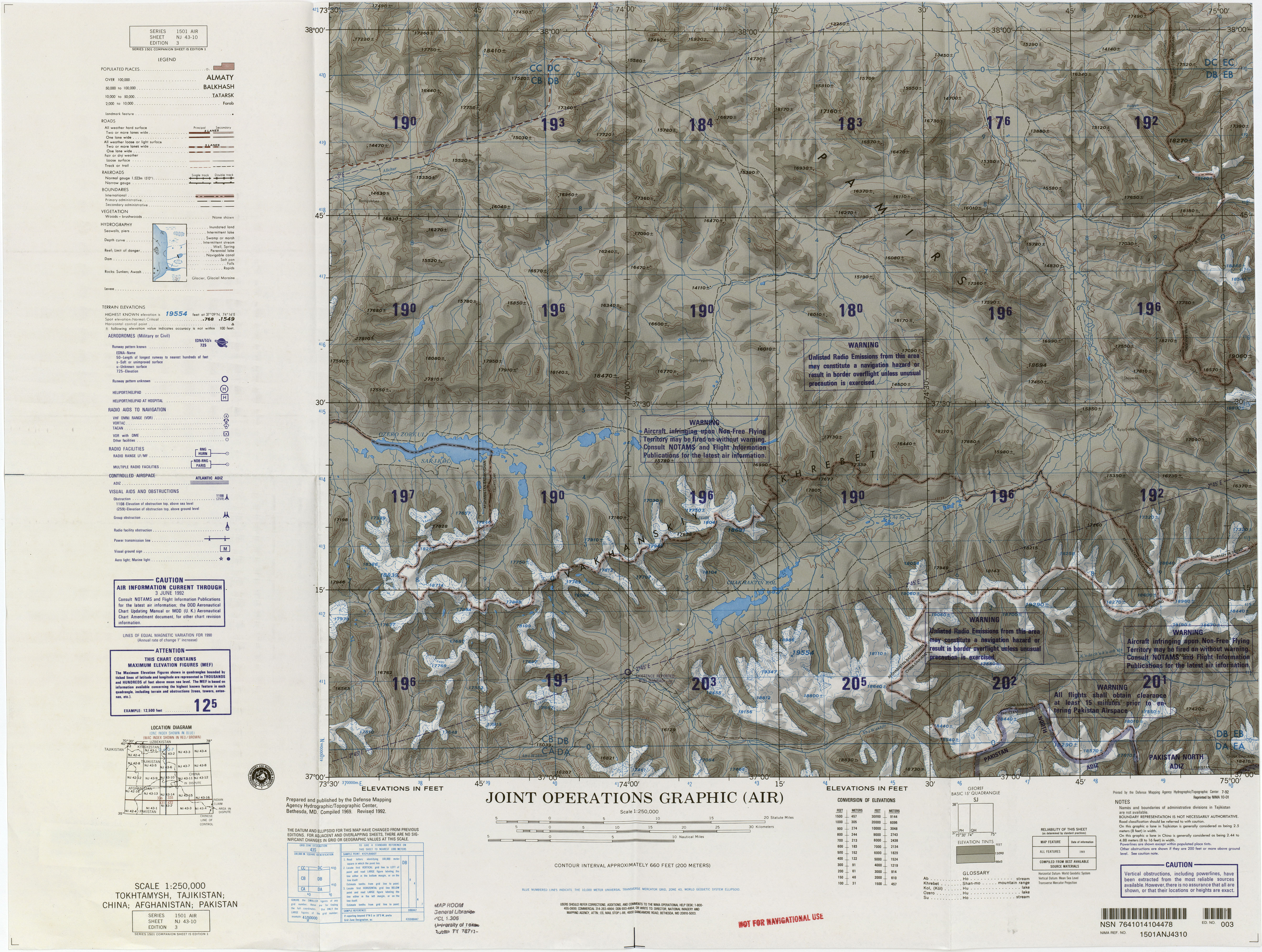
Portion of the China–Tajikistan border (labeled "BOUNDARY IN DISPUTE") including the tripoint with Afghanistan (DMA, 1992) (Note: From map: "BOUNDARY REPRESENTATION IS NOT NECESSARILY AUTHORITATIVE.")

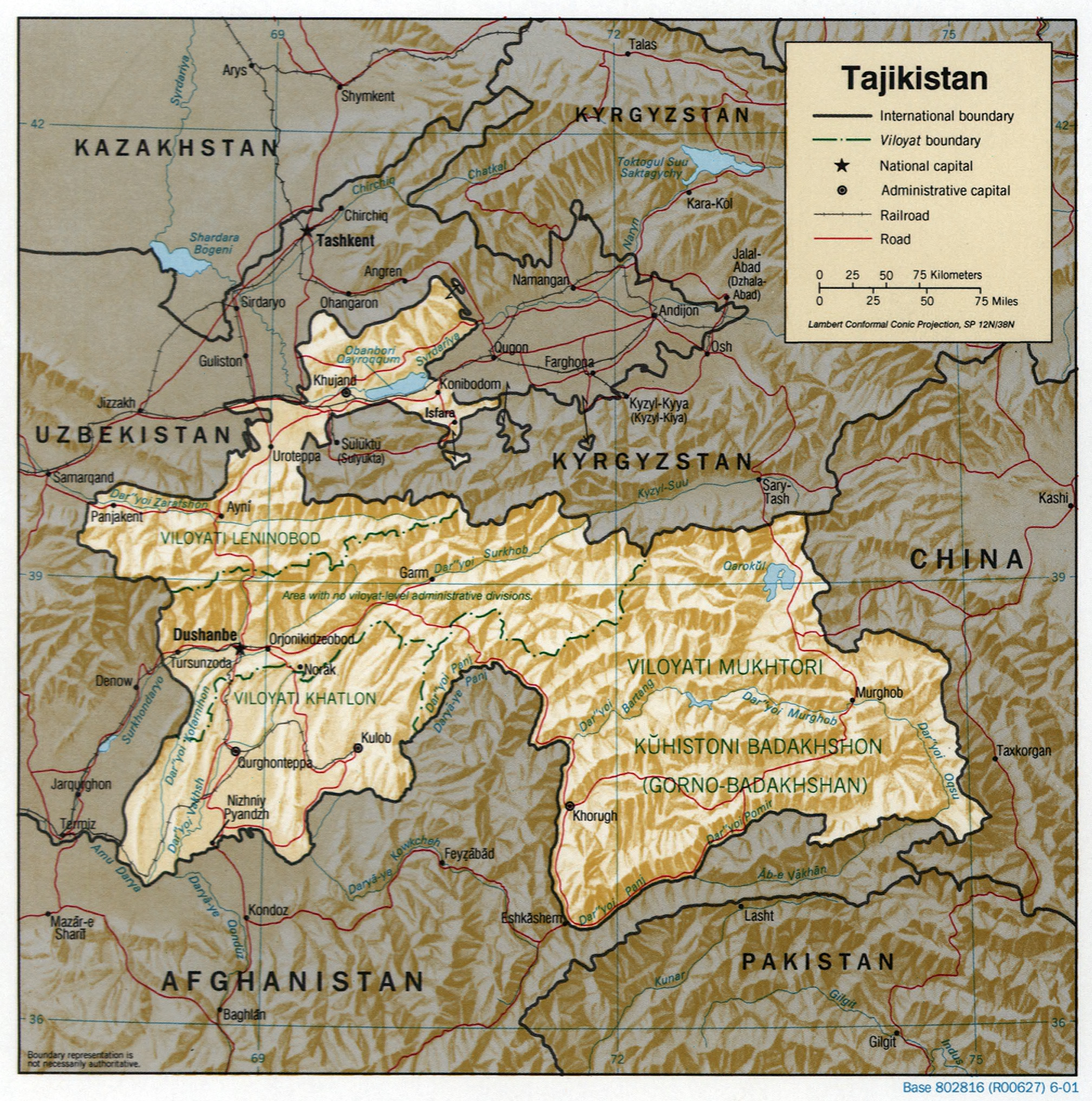
Map of Tajikistan showing the border with China and road through Uzbel/Kyzyl-Dzhiik Pass (2001)

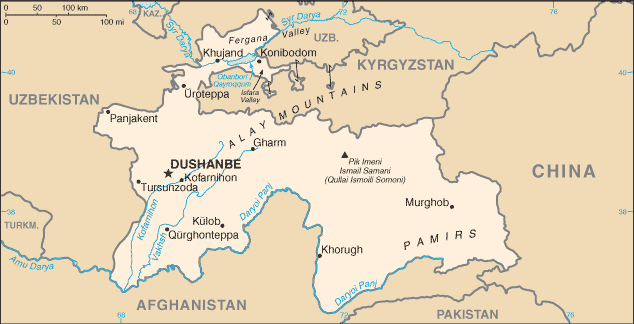
Historical map of Tajikistan showing the border with China

== See also ==
- Chalachigu Valley
- List of extreme points of China
- Extreme points of Tajikistan
- Karakoram Highway
- Beyik Pass
- Tegermansu Pass
- Wakhjir Pass
- Kilik Pass
- Mintaka Pass
- Afghanistan–China border
- China–Pakistan border
