= Beyik Pass =

Mountain pass between China and Tajikistan

- Location within Southern Xinjiang Location within Tajikistan
- Interactive map of Beyik Pass
- Elevation: 4,742 metres (15,558 ft)

Third Approach
- Location: China–Tajikistan border
- Range: Sarikol_Range, Pamir Mountains
- Coordinates: 37°18′N 75°00′E

Beyik Pass

Chinese name
- Traditional Chinese: 排依克山口
- Simplified Chinese: 排依克山口
- Literal meaning: Payik Pass
Transcriptions
Standard Mandarin
- Hanyu Pinyin: Páiyīkè shānkǒu

Alternative Chinese name
- Traditional Chinese: 别伊克山口
- Simplified Chinese: 别伊克山口
- Literal meaning: Beyik Pass
Transcriptions
Standard Mandarin
- Hanyu Pinyin: Biéyīkè shānkǒu

Uyghur name
- Uyghur: بېيىك ئېغىزى

Tajik name
- Tajik: Ағбаи Беик

The Beyik Pass, also transliterated as Payik Pass or Bayik Pass, is a mountain pass in the Sarikol Range between Gorno-Badakhshan in Tajikistan and the Taghdumbash Pamir in Tashkurgan Tajik Autonomous County in Xinjiang, China. It lies at an elevation of 4,742 metres (15,558 ft). There is an ethnic Kyrgyz village on the Chinese side also named Beyik (Chinese: 排依克村), but in Chinese the village is more commonly referred to by a different name (Chinese: 阿特加依里村) and Beyik is reserved for a border outpost.

== History ==
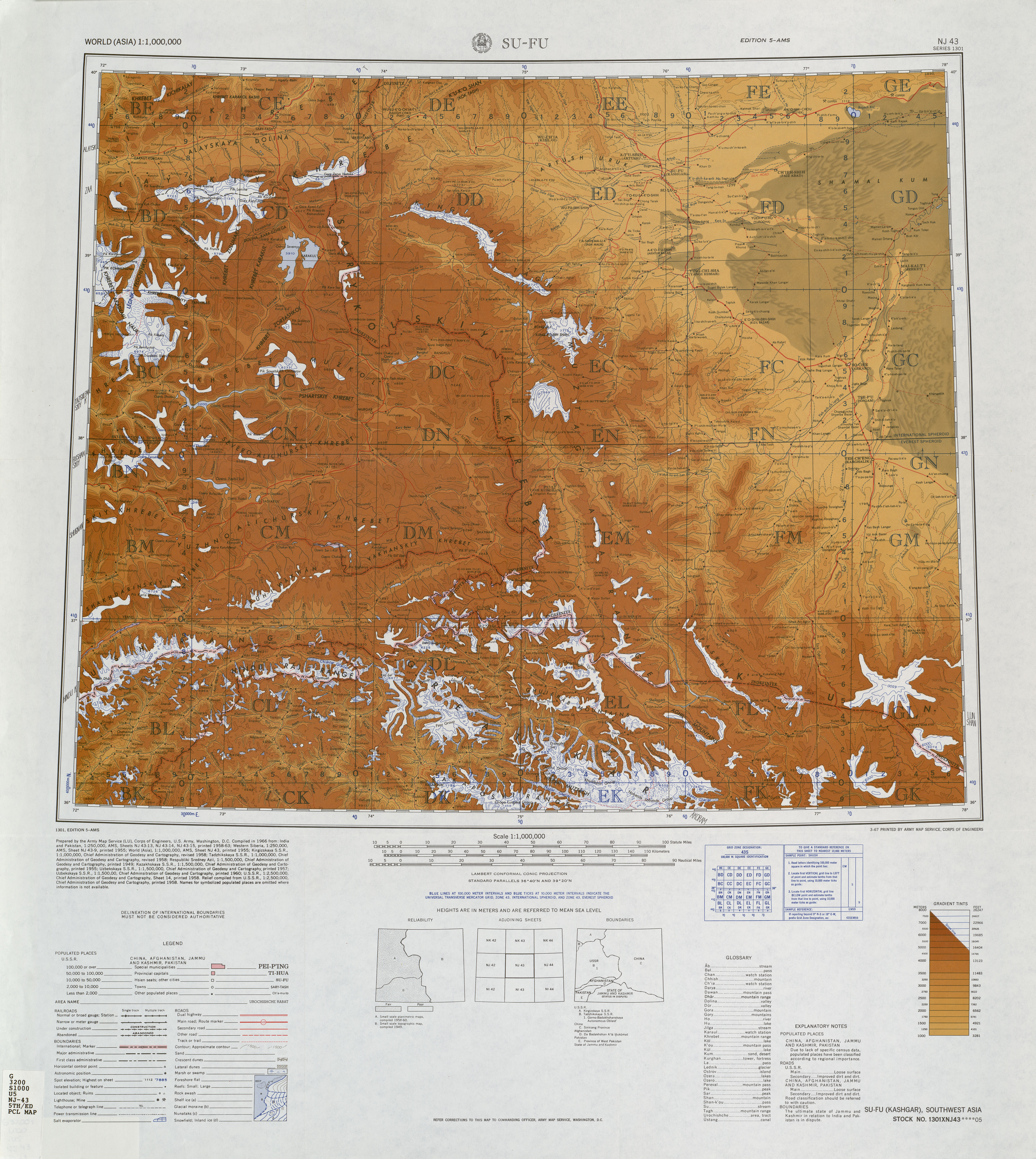
Map including Beyik Pass (labeled as PIEH-K'O SHAN-K'OU (BEIK PASS)) (AMS, 1966)

Some Chinese historians argue that Xuanzang, the Chinese Buddhist whose pilgrimage to India inspired the novel Journey to the West, used this path on his way to India.

That path is in the historic region of Badakhshan. In the 1890s, the Chinese, Russian, and Afghan governments signed a series of agreements that divided Badakhshan, but China contested the result of the division. The dispute was eventually settled in 2002 when Tajikistan and China signed a border agreement.

The path is difficult to traverse all year round. It is snow covered during the winter months. The snow persists until May. During the summer months, the melting causes the streams to overflow. The entire Chalachigu Valley on the Chinese side is closed to visitors; however, local residents and herders from the area are permitted access.

== See also ==
- China–Tajikistan border
- Tegermansu Pass
- Wakhjir Pass
- Kilik Pass
- Mintaka Pass
- Chalachigu Valley
- Afghanistan–China border
- China–Pakistan border
