= Taghdumbash Pamir =

Valley in Xinjiang, China

- Taxkorgan Nature Reserve
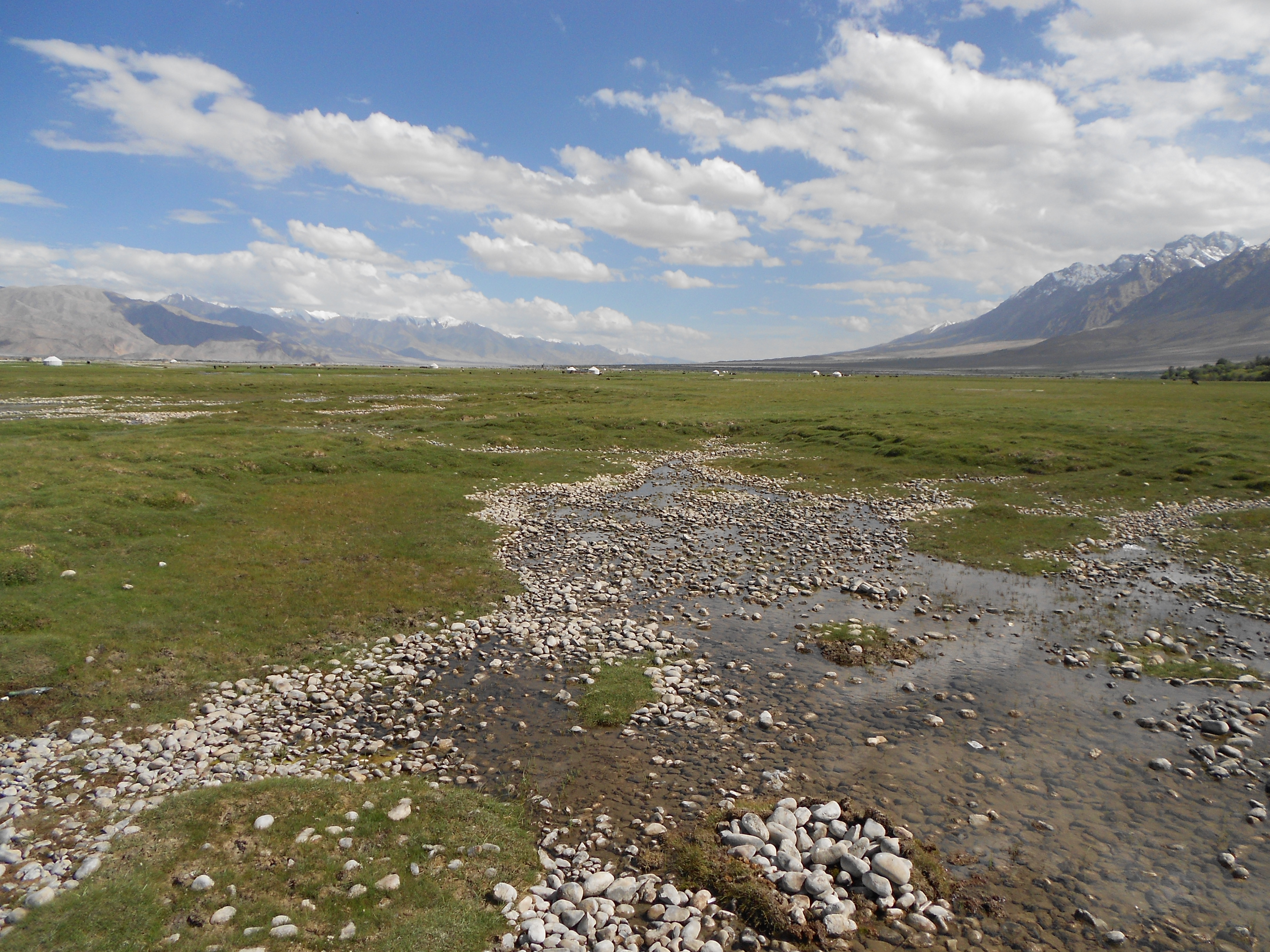

- Location within Southern Xinjiang Location within Xinjiang Location within China

Geography
- Location: Taxkorgan Tajik Autonomous County, Xinjiang, China
- Population centers: Dafdar
- Coordinates: 37°12′N 75°24′E
- Traversed by: Karakoram Highway
- Interactive map of Taghdumbash Pamir

Taghdumbash Pamir
- Traditional Chinese: 塔克敦巴什帕米爾
- Simplified Chinese: 塔克敦巴什帕米尔
Transcriptions
Standard Mandarin
- Hanyu Pinyin: Tǎkèdūnbāshén pàmǐ'ěr

Alternative Chinese name
- Traditional Chinese: 塔德八士
- Simplified Chinese: 塔德八士
Transcriptions
Standard Mandarin
- Hanyu Pinyin: Tǎdébāshì

Taghdumbash Pamir (Chinese: 塔克敦巴什帕米尔 or historically Chinese: 塔德八士) is a pamir or high valley in the south west of Tashkurgan Tajik Autonomous County, in Xinjiang, China. It lies to the west of the Karakoram Highway. It is inhabited by Wakhi, Kirghiz and Sarikolis animal herders, who graze yaks and other animals on the grasslands of the Pamir.

The name Taghdumbash Pamir is also sometimes applied to the mountain ranges surrounding the Pamir, on the borders of Pakistan, Afghanistan, and Tajikistan with China, straddling the Pamir Mountains along the Sarikol Range, the Hindu Kush, the Mustagh mountains, and the Wakhan. The range divides Badakhshan Province in Afghanistan, Gorno-Badakhshan Autonomous Province in Tajikistan, and Gilgit-Baltistan region in Pakistan.

During the Qing dynasty, the Chinese claimed suzerainty over the area but permitted the Mir of Hunza to administer the region in return for a tribute. According to British colonial sources, this arrangement started during early Ayosh dynasty of Mir of Hunza, as the Mir conquered the Kirghiz nomads of Taghdumbash Pamir. The Mir erected a cairn in Dafdar to evidence his control. The tribute system continued until 1937.

In 1984, the pamir and surrounding area was designated Taxkorgan Nature Reserve. Chalachigu Valley, an offshoot of the Taxkorgan Valley is the only place in China where Marco Polo sheep can be found.
