= Sarikol Range =

Mountain range in Tajikistan and China

Sarikol Range Сарыкольский хребет Қаторкӯҳи Сариқӯл 萨雷阔勒岭
- Location within Tajikistan

Highest point
- Peak: Mount Lyavirdyr
- Elevation: 6,351 m (20,837 ft)
- Coordinates: 38°38′N 74°30′E

Dimensions
- Length: 350 km (220 mi) N/S
- Width: 35 km (22 mi) E/W

Geography
- Country: Tajikistan / China
- Parent range: Pamir Mountains

Geology
- Rock age: Paleozoic
- Rock type(s): Granite, schist and gneiss

The Sarikol Range (Russian: Сарыкольский хребет; Chinese: 萨雷阔勒岭, 色勒库尔山脉; Tajik: Қаторкӯҳи Сариқӯл) is a mountain range in the Pamirs on the border of Tajikistan and the People's Republic of China.

== Etymology ==
The mountain range is named for the Sarikol River at its foot, the name of which comes from the Kyrgyz Сарыкол, Sarıqol, which is composed of сары, sarı, 'yellow', and кол, qol, 'river', meaning "yellow river". In this toponym, the word кол, qol, 'river', originates neither from the Kyrgyz кол, qol, 'arm', nor from the Kyrgyz көл, köl, 'lake', but rather from the Mongolian гол, gol, 'river'.

The name has also been used to describe the local people who are historically known as Sarikolis; the local Sarikoli language, and the town of Tashkurgan, which was historically known as Sarikol.

== Geography ==
The range divides Tajikistan's Gorno-Badakhshan Autonomous Province and China's Xinjiang Uyghur Autonomous Region and it runs parallel with the Muztagh Range to the east. The range extends 346 kilometres (215 mi) from the Markansu River in the north to the Beyik Pass in the south. Its average elevation is roughly 5,000 metres (16,500 ft) and the highest point in the range is Mount Lyavirdyr at 6,351 m (20,837 ft). On the Tajik part of the range there are 240 glaciers with a total area of 144 km^{2}. The range's drainage basin feeds both the Amu Darya and Tarim River. The range is composed of schist, granite and gneiss.

== See also ==
- List of mountains in Tajikistan
- China–Tajikistan border
