= Safar Hai Shart =

- Genre: Travelogue
- Starring: Waqar Ahmed Malik & Mukkaram Kaleem
- Country of origin: Pakistan
- Original language: Urdu

Production
- Producer: Waqar Ahmed Malik
- Production location: Pakistan
- Running time: 38 minutes (per episode)

Original release
- Network: Express News

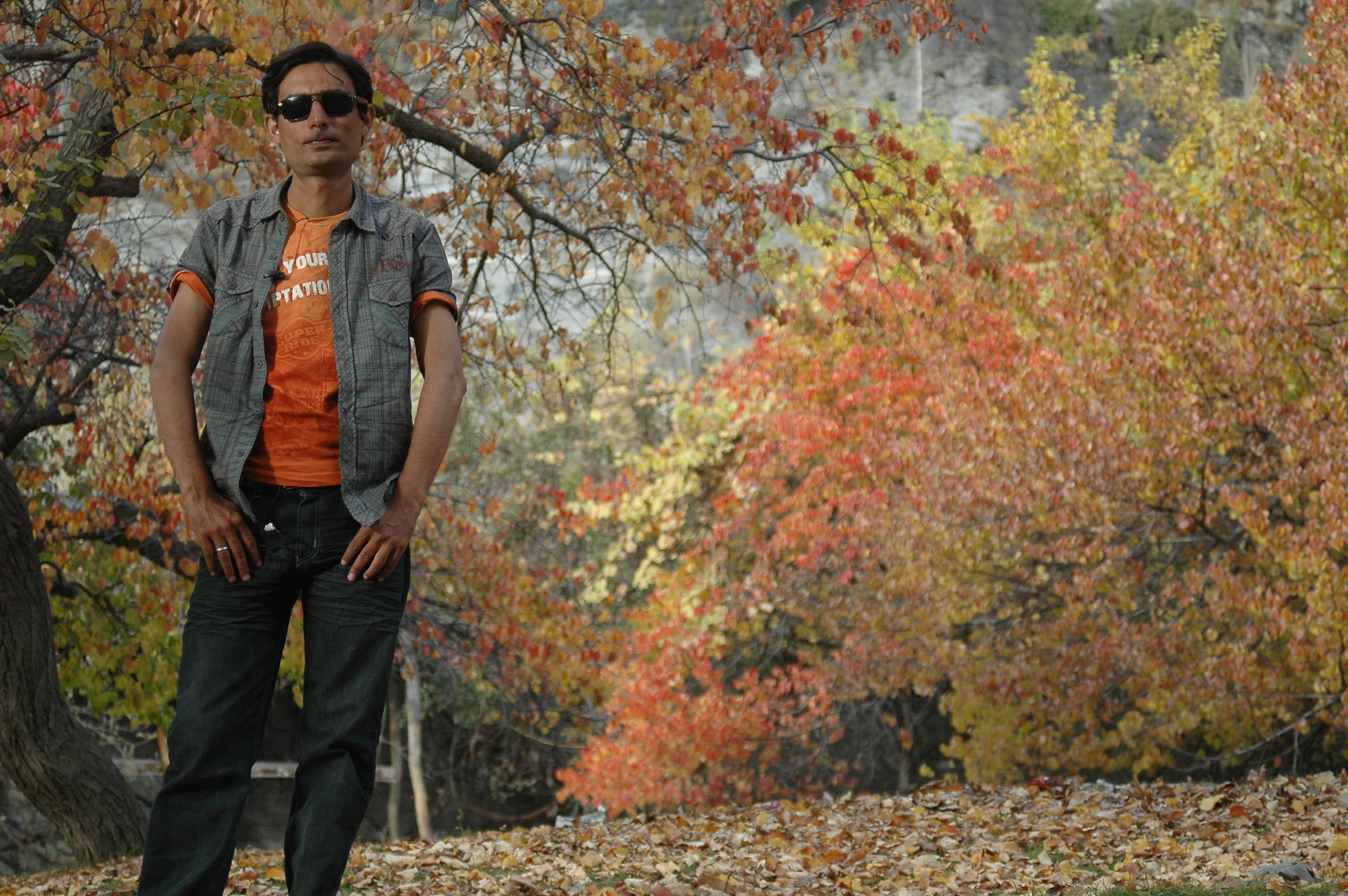
Waqar Ahmed Malik, host and producer/director of Safar Hai Shart

Safar Hai Shart is a travelogue television show on-air on Express News. The show was hosted by Waqar Ahmed Malik and Mukkaram Kaleem. Safar Hai Shart was an exclusive travelogue produced by Waqar Ahmed Malik, completed on nothing but motorbikes. Two guys on bikes explored the wonders of the Karakoram Highway in Pakistan. The Karakoram Highway (KKH) is the highest paved international road in the world and often known as the 8th wonder of the world. The travels started from Rawalpindi and end on Khunjerab Pass (elevation 4,693 metres or 15,397 feet), the highest paved international border crossing in the world and the highest point on the Karakoram Highway. The show comprises the adventure, thrill and depiction of native culture of Kohistan, Gilgit and Hunza. Safar Hai Shart also showed Nanga Parbat (the killer mountain) and the related expedition stories specially of Hermann Buhl, Reinhold Messner in 6th and 7th episodes. This program was produced with the cooperation of Frontier Works Organisation and World Wide Fund for Nature.

== With Mustansar Hussain Tarar ==
Express News is going to launch Safar Hai Shart season 2 with Mustansar Hussain Tarar. Mustansar Hussain Tarar with his co-host Waqar Ahmed Malik will try to reach the Rakaposhi base camp.

== Concept ==
Pakistan is home to 108 peaks above 7,000 metres and probably as many peaks above 6,000 m. There is no count of the peaks above 5,000 and 4,000 m. Five of the 14 highest independent peaks in the world (the eight-thousanders) are in Pakistan. Tourism in Pakistan has been stated by the Lonely Planet magazine as being the tourism industry's "next big thing", but after 9/11 Pakistan's tourism sector was affected badly. Safar Hai Shart was an effort to revive the tourism activities in Gilgit-Baltistan region.

== Credits ==
- Waqar Ahmed Malik Producer/Director/Writer and Anchor
- Mukarram Kaleem: Anchor/Senior Associate producer
- Nadeem Bhati: Cameraman
- Ahmed Ali Hussain: Editor
- Shoaib Sarwar: Concept

== Episodes ==
- Episode 1: Travels through Taxila, Havelian, Khanpur Dam
- Episode 2: Travels through Abbottabad Mansehra
- Episode 3: Travels through Thakot Chattar Plains
- Episode 4: Travels through Besham Patan and intro of Great Indus River and Alexander the Great
- Episode 5: Travels through Dassu Nala Samar Chilas
- Episode 6: Travels through Chilas, Chilas Fort, archaeological sites, Babusar Top (14000 ft above sea level)
- Episode 7: Travels through the most dangerous Fairy Meadow Nanga Parbat Track
- Episode 8: Travels through Fairy Meadows and Nanga Parbat, the killer mountain.
- Episode 9: Nanga Parbat, the killer mountain. History of expeditions.
- Episode 10: Travels through Gilgit and surroundings, culture literature
- Episode 11: Travels through Gilgit and surroundings, ancient carvings, education, polo match etc.
- Episode 12: Travels through Hunza and surroundings Rakaposhi, the most beautiful mountain in the world
- Episode 13: Hunza and surroundings, the capital of this ancient state, Attabad lake
- Episode 14: Hunza and surroundings upper Hunza and Khunjerab Pass (16000 ft above sea level)
