= Natco =

NatCo stands for National Company and describes a subsidiary of a multinational corporation. Often used in connection with telephone companies (so called TelCos).

NATCO is also an abbreviation used by a number of very different organisations:

- National Tea Company, a midwestern US grocery chain
- NATCO Group, provides equipment for separating water from crude oil
- Northern Areas Transport Corporation, runs buses in Pakistan-controlled Kashmir

Natco may also refer to:

- Natco, New Jersey
- Natco Pharma, an Indian pharmaceutical company
