= Upal =

Town in western Xinjiang, China

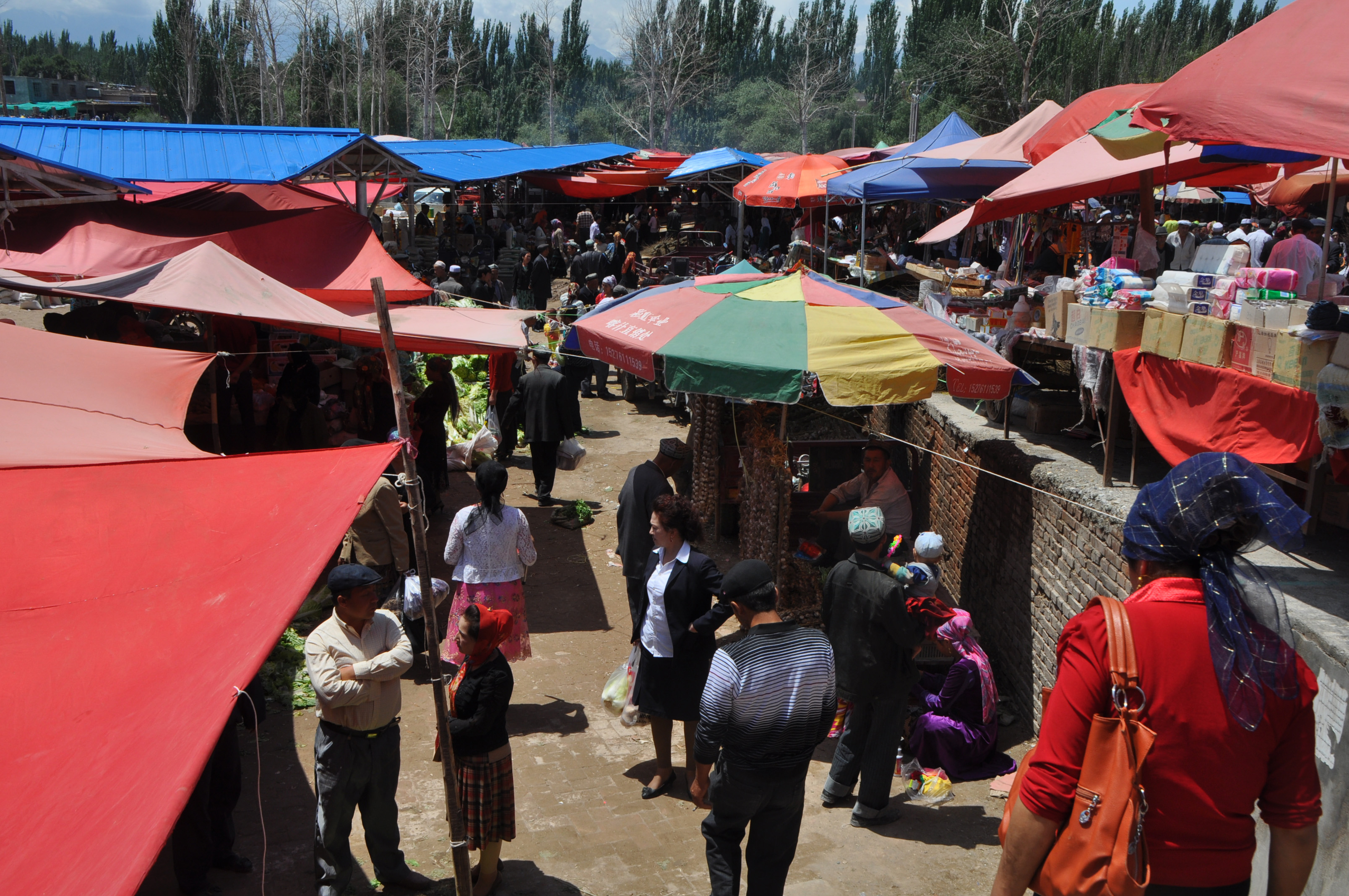
- Monday bazaar at Upal

- Location within Southern Xinjiang
- Coordinates: 39°18′N 75°32′E
- Country: People's Republic of China
- Autonomous region: Xinjiang
- Prefecture: Kashgar
- County: Shufu

Upal

Chinese name
- Traditional Chinese: 烏帕爾鎮
- Simplified Chinese: 乌帕尔镇
Transcriptions
Standard Mandarin
- Hanyu Pinyin: Wūpà'ěr Zhèn
- Wade–Giles: Wu^{1}p‘a^{4}êrh^{3} Chen^{4}
other Mandarin
- Xiao'erjing: ءُپَاعَر سِيْا

Uyghur name
- Uyghur: ئوپال
Transcriptions
- Latin Yëziqi: Upal
- Siril Yëziqi: Упал

Upal (Chinese: 乌帕尔镇; Uyghur: ئوپال) is a town in Shufu County in Western Xinjiang, China.

== Karakoram Highway ==
Upal is on the Karakoram Highway, which follows the old Silk Road route from China to Pakistan. Travelling from China, it is about 50 km southwest of Kashgar or about 180 km north of Tashkurgan (which is about 120 km over the Khunjerab Pass from Sust in Pakistan).

== Mahmud al-Kashgari ==
Mahmud al-Kashgari died in 1102 at the age of 97 in Upal. There is now a mausoleum erected on his gravesite. He is remembered as a prominent Turkic language scholar.

== Monday Bazaar ==
A bazaar (Chinese: 乌帕尔乡的周一巴扎) is held every Monday. Being that this village is along the Karakoram Highway, it is frequently visited not only by local people but also by the tourists on their way back from Karakul Lake, a popular sightseeing site in Kashgar.

The bazaar is held along the national highway, under the large tents in the back of the houses on the western side (the left side as you go back to Kashgar) of the highway. The animals market is located in the southernmost part of the market.
