= Hathimera =

Hathimera is a village situated in Mansehra District, Khyber Pakhtunkhwa Province, Pakistan. It is adjacent to the great Karakorum Highway, at latitude 34°23'47.11"N longitude 73°13'9.88"E.

Historically, Hathimera served as King Akbar's pathway to the Indian subcontinent. His wife's elephant died there, and the village was therefore named Hathimra ("Elephant Died"). As time passed, the name was changed to Hathimera ("Elephant Place"). Construction workers have found artifacts, including pots and gold rings; human skeletons have also been found wearing clothes or sitting, not in graves, which is interpreted to mean they were drowned or swept away by some natural disaster.

Hathimera has a population of approximately 10,000. The literacy rate is about 70%. there are many families like Abbasi, Swati, Sardar, Awan, Yousafzai, tanoli, and other are residing here.
