= Barigo Miankheel =

Pakistani Hill Station near Dassu

Coordinates: 35.454°N 72.949°E

Barigo Miankheel is a hill station, 30 kilometres (19 mi) away from Dassu in Upper Kohistan District of Khyber Pakhtunkhwa, Pakistan.
