= Pattan Tehsil =

Pattan Tehsil تحصیل پٹن پټن تحصیل
- Tehsil, Union Council
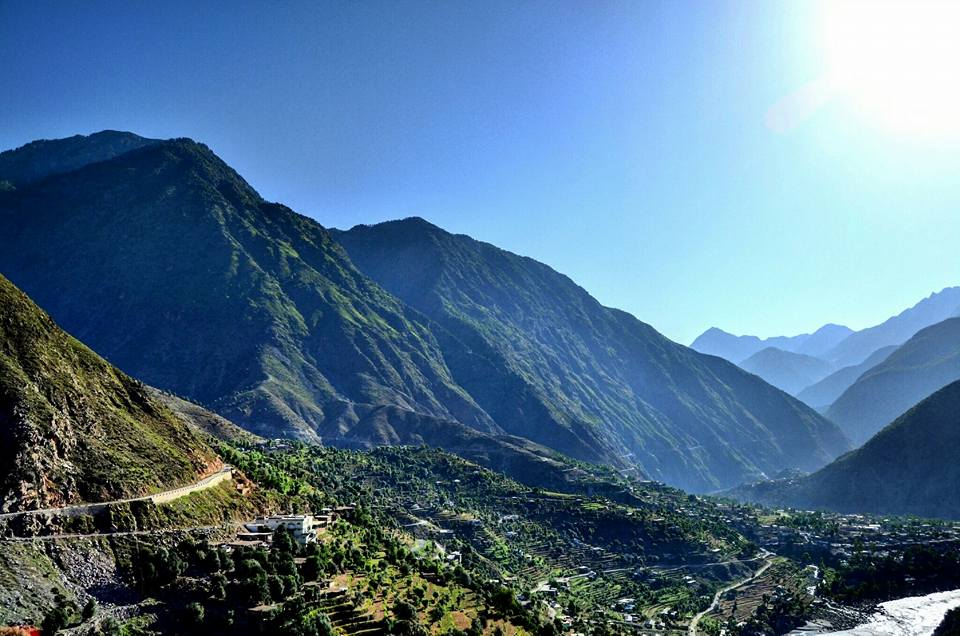
- Interactive map of Pattan Tehsil
- Country: Pakistan
- Province: Khyber Pakhtunkhwa
- District: Lower Kohistan

Government
  - Chairman: Maulana Rehmatullah (IND)
- Elevation: 833 m (2,733 ft)

Population (2023)
  - Total: 126,248
- Time zone: UTC+5 (PST)

Pattan (Kohistani, Urdu: پٹن) is the capital of Lower Kohistan District in the Khyber Pakhtunkhwa province of Pakistan.

== Demographics ==
According to the 2023 Pakistani census, the total population of Pattan Tehsil was 126,248. Indus Kohistani was the main language, spoken by 124,728 (98.79%) people.

== Climate ==
With a mild and generally warm and temperate climate, Pattan features a humid subtropical climate (Cfa) under the Köppen climate classification. The average temperature in Pattan is 19.6 °C, while the annual precipitation averages 802 mm. Even in the driest months, there is a lot of precipitation. November is the driest month with 17 mm of precipitation, while July, the wettest month, has an average precipitation of 123 mm.

July is the hottest month of the year with an average temperature of 29.3 °C. The coldest month January has an average temperature of 7.9 °C.

Climate data for Pattan
Month	Jan	Feb	Mar	Apr	May	Jun	Jul	Aug	Sep	Oct	Nov	Dec	Year
Mean daily maximum °C (°F)	13.3 (55.9)	15.9 (60.6)	20.8 (69.4)	26.1 (79.0)	31.6 (88.9)	36.8 (98.2)	35.9 (96.6)	34.4 (93.9)	32.6 (90.7)	28.2 (82.8)	22.3 (72.1)	15.6 (60.1)	26.1 (79.0)
Daily mean °C (°F)	7.9 (46.2)	10.3 (50.5)	14.7 (58.5)	19.7 (67.5)	24.5 (76.1)	29.2 (84.6)	29.3 (84.7)	28.3 (82.9)	25.7 (78.3)	20.6 (69.1)	15.0 (59.0)	9.6 (49.3)	19.6 (67.2)
Mean daily minimum °C (°F)	2.6 (36.7)	4.7 (40.5)	8.7 (47.7)	13.3 (55.9)	17.4 (63.3)	21.7 (71.1)	22.8 (73.0)	22.2 (72.0)	18.8 (65.8)	13.0 (55.4)	7.7 (45.9)	3.7 (38.7)	13.1 (55.5)
Source: Climate-Data.org

== See also ==
- Dasu
- Khyber Pakhtunkhwa
