= Northern Areas Transport Corporation =

Public transport company in Pakistan

NATCO
- Industry: Transport
- Founded: 1974
- Headquarters: Gilgit, Pakistan
- Key people: Tahir Hussain (Chairman); Muhammad Saeedullah Yousafzai (Managing Director)
- Website: www.natco.gov.pk

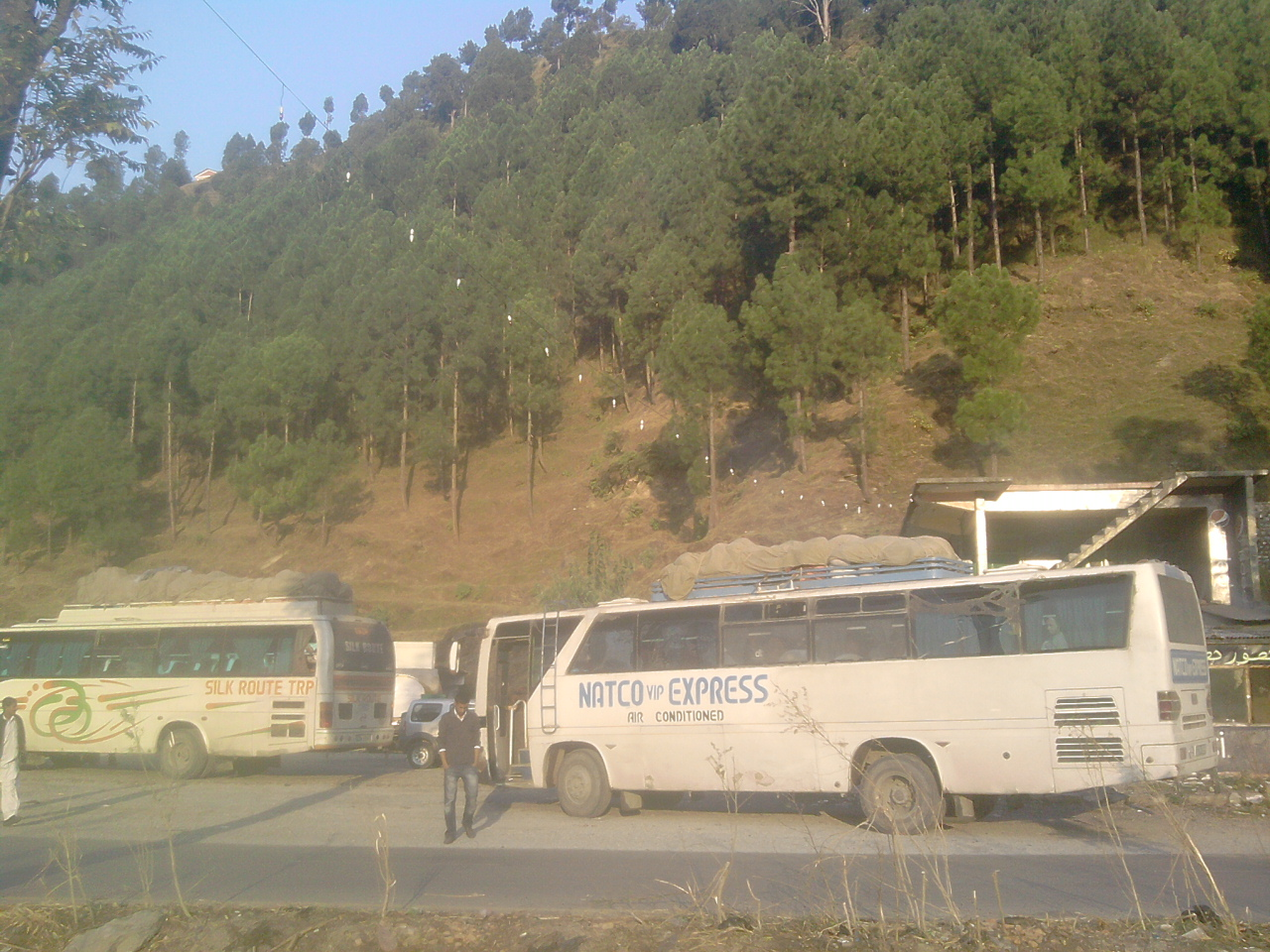
NATCO bus at Balakot, Mansehra

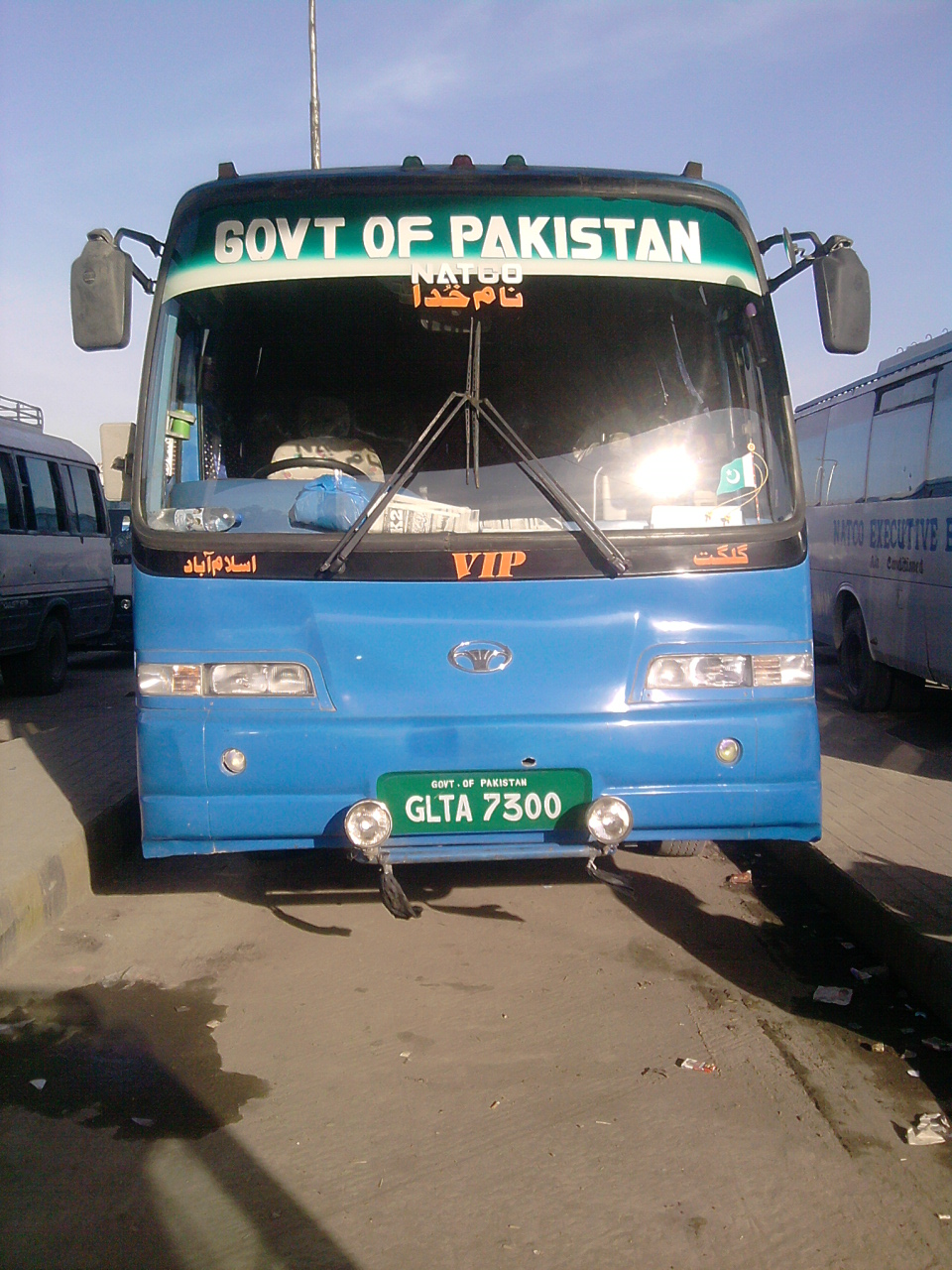
NATCO bus at bus stand in Rawalpindi

Northern Areas Transport Corporation or NATCO (Urdu: ٹرانسپورٹ کارپوریشن برائے شمالی علاقہ جات) is the largest transport company in Gilgit-Baltistan, Pakistan and throughout the Karakoram Highway. NATCO is providing its service from Rawalpindi to Karachi daily for the last decade. It is connecting all Pakistan.

The company works under the Ministry of Kashmir Affairs & Gilgit Baltistan.

NATCO offers passenger road service between Islamabad, Gilgit and Sust (near the Chinese border). There is passenger road service between Tashkurgan and the Pakistani cities of Sust and Gilgit. Road service between Kashgar and Gilgit (via Tashkurgan and Sust) started in summer 2006. However, the border crossing between China and Pakistan at Khunjerab Pass (the highest border in the world) is open only between May 1 and December 31 as the roads are blocked by snow during winter. You can find Information of routes and Fares in Official site. NATCO Bus Services is always closed during Eid vacations, which last for three days.

On 30 November 2006 NATCO started a non-stop express bus service from Islamabad to Gilgit.

on 20 April 2015 NATCO Celebrated its 41st anniversary at its Head Office in Gilgit.

== See also ==
- Karakoram Highway
- Gilgit
- Gilgit-Baltistan
- Karakoram
