= Sust =

Sost سوست
- Village
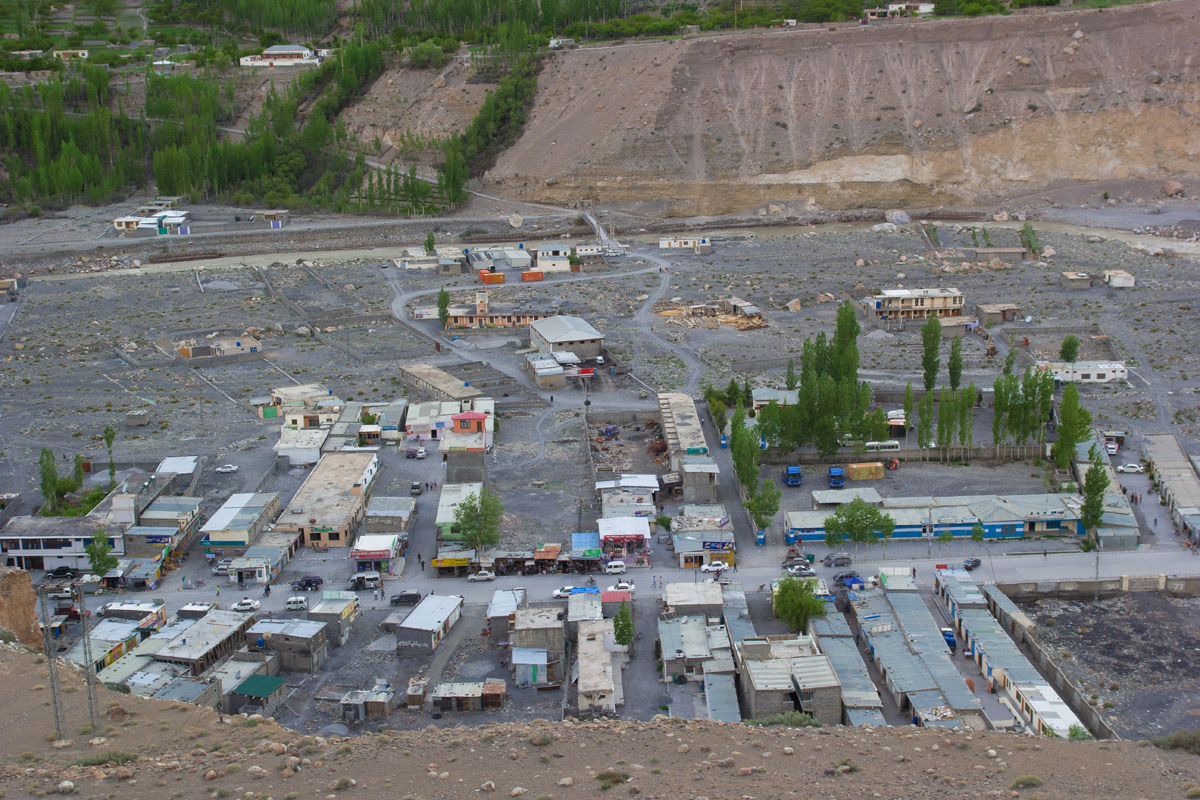
- The town of Sost
- Interactive map of Sost
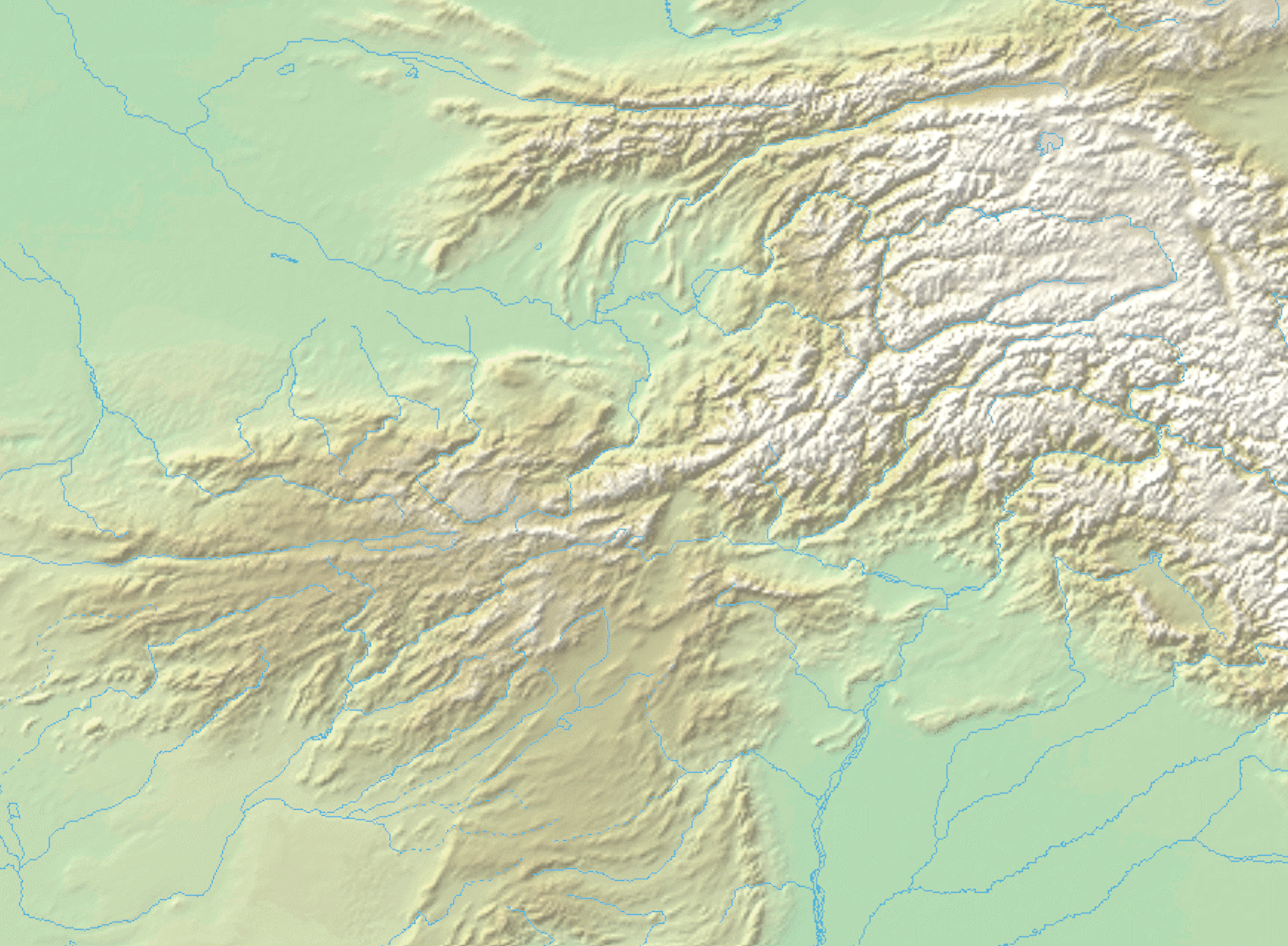
- Location within Gilgit Baltistan Location within Pakistan Location within Hindu-Kush Location within West and Central Asia
- Coordinates: 36.69°N 74.821°E
- Country: Pakistan
- Autonomous state: Gilgit-Baltistan
- Division: Gilgit
- District: Hunza
- Sub-division: Gojal Tehsil
- Elevation: 2,800 m (9,200 ft)
- Area code: 05813-9

Sust or Sost (Urdu: سوست) is a village located in the Gojal, Upper Hunza in the Gilgit–Baltistan region of Pakistan. Situated at an elevation of 2,800 meters above sea level, Sost is the last Pakistani town on the Karakoram Highway before the Chinese border.

== History ==
The Khunjerab Pass between Pakistan and China for tourism and limited trade in the 1980s. With the creation of the China-Pakistan Economic Corridor (CPEC) in 2016, Sost took on a more central role in a $46 billion effort to boost trade for Pakistan by broadening its range of potential partners through the Middle East, Africa, and Europe.

Given Sost's status as a transportation hub, it plays an important role regarding both passengers and cargo crossing the Pakistan-China border. Branches of the Pakistan immigration and customs departments are correspondingly based in Sost. Sost is also home to a Serena Hotel.

The Silk Route Dry Port commenced its business operations at the port in Sost, Upper Hunza, near the Khunjerab Pass in Gilgit-Baltistan. The annual trade volume between these two countries has increased from approximately $50 million in the mid-1970s ($300 million in 2019)to $14.5 billion in 2019 – an increase of almost 5000%. Trade increased year on year 12.5% to $16.724 billion between January and August 2025. Sost Dry Port collected more than Rs9.5 billion in 2024, a 72% increase over the Rs5.525 billion collected the previous year. It collected a monthly record Rs1.88 billion in October 2025.

== Demography ==
The main languages spoken in Sost are Wakhi and Burushaski.

== Transport ==
The Sost Dry Port is connected by the Karakoram Highway to Gulmit, Aliabad, Gilgit and Chilas to the south and to the Chinese cities of Tashkurgan, Upal and Kashgar in the north. The Northern Areas Transport Corporation offers passenger road service between Islamabad, Gilgit and Sost. Passenger road service between Tashkurgan and Sost also exists. Road service between Kashgar and Gilgit (via Tashkurgan and Sost) started in summer 2006. The border crossing between China and Pakistan at Khunjerab Pass (the highest border in the world) is open year-round. Because of its harsh weather and high altitude, it had previously only been open only between April 1 and November 30. However, in 2024 an agreement was signed between the governments of the two countries committing to keep the pass open year-round.

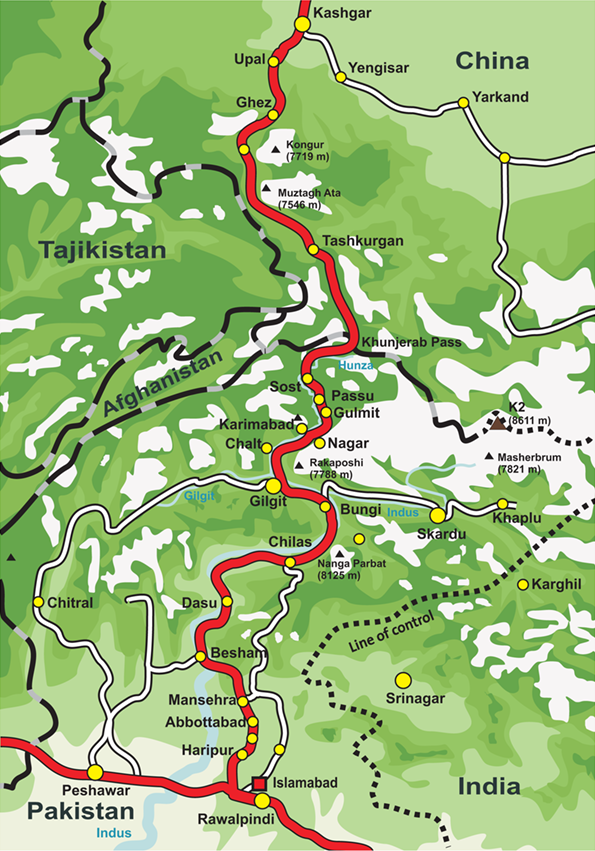
Overview of the Karakoram Highway

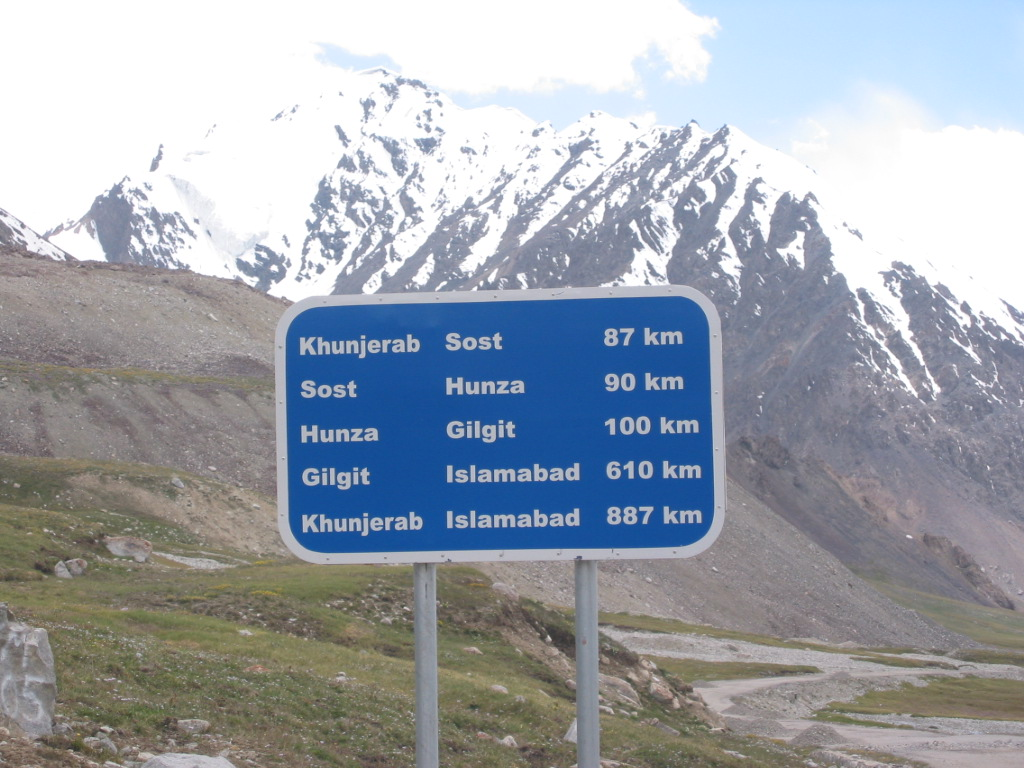
A mileage sign in Sost.

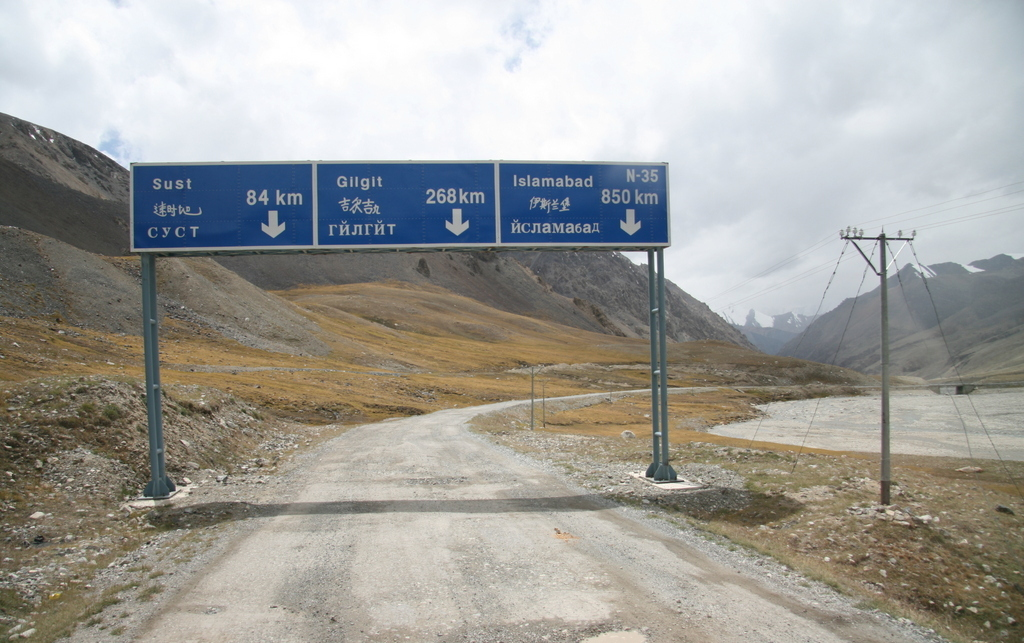
Distances to Sost, Islamabad, and Gilgit.

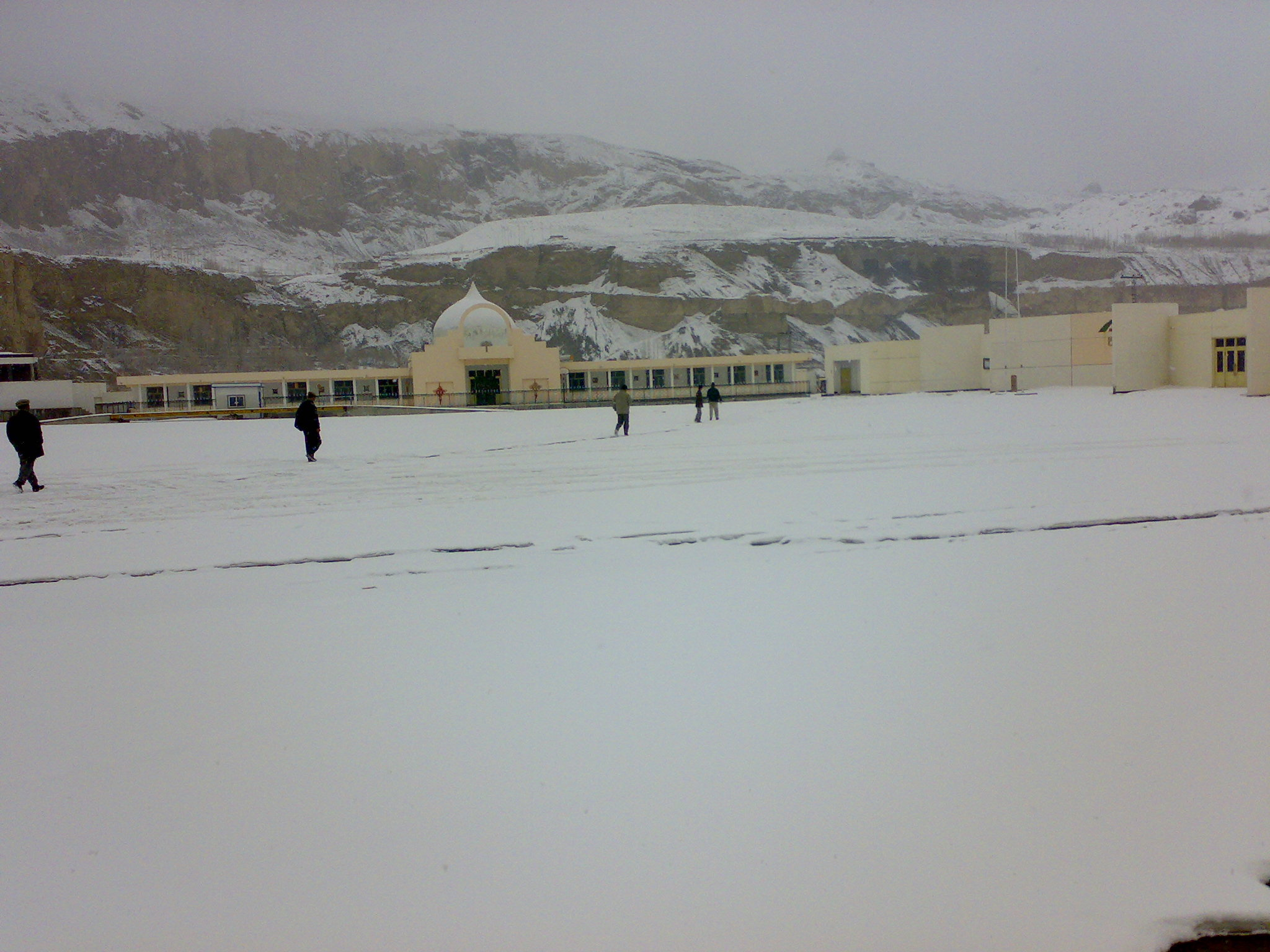
Sost Dry Port

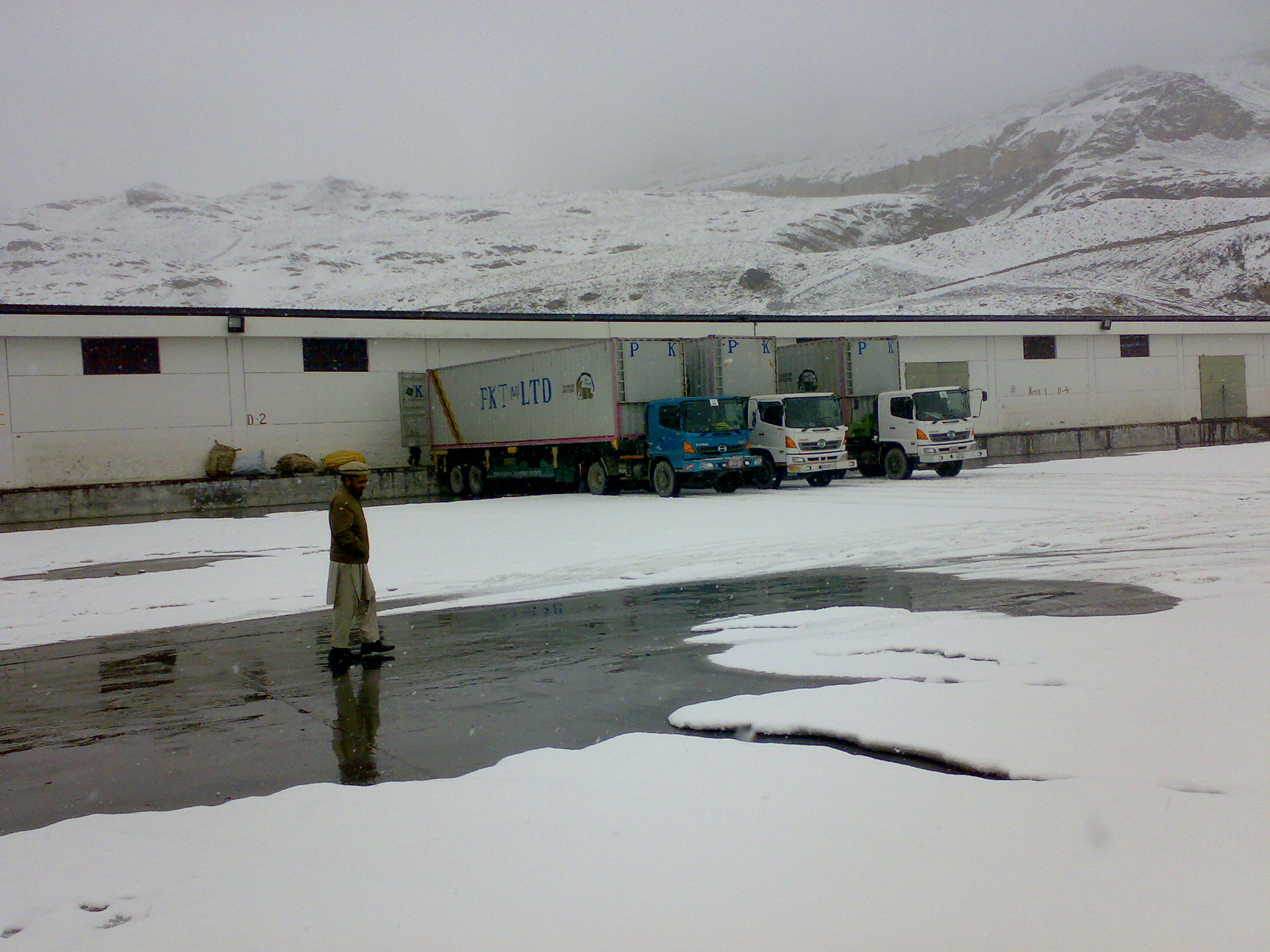
Sost Dry Port loading dock
