= Karakoram Highway =

International highway running through Pakistan and China

Coordinates: 35°36′N 74°39′E

National Highway 35
- قومی شاہراہ ٣٥
- Karakoram Highway شاہراہ قراقرم
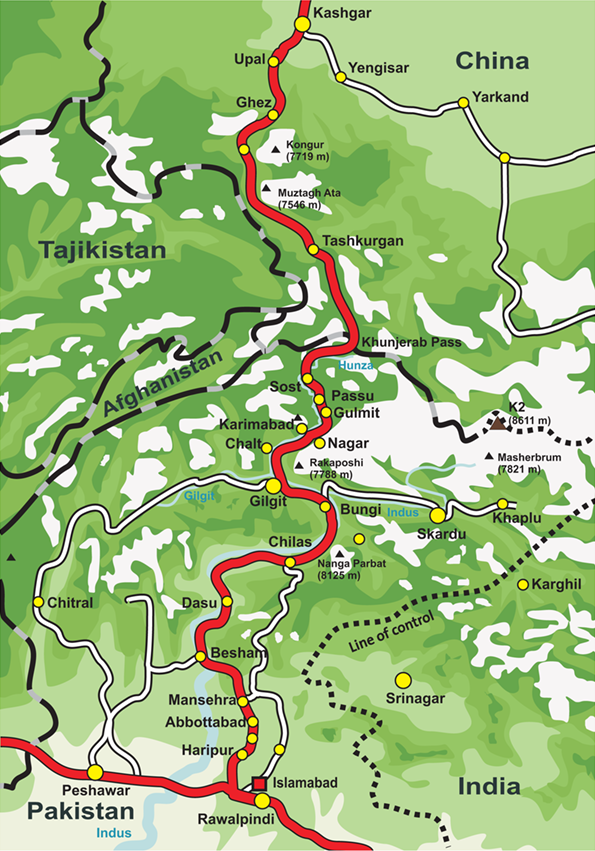

Route information
- Part of AH4 Asian Highway
- Maintained by National Highway Authority (Pakistan) and Transport Department of Xinjiang Uyghur Autonomous Region (China)
- Length: 1,300 km (810 mi) Pakistan: 887 km (551 mi); China: 413 km (257 mi)
- Existed: 1966–present
- History: Completed in 1979, open to the public since 1986

Major junctions
- North end: Kashgar, Xinjiang, China; China National Highway 314 (Khunjerab Pass–Kashgar–Ürümqi) (Pakistan) Khunjerab Pass
- N-35; N-15
- South end: Hasan Abdal, Punjab, Pakistan

Location
- Country: Pakistan
- Major cities: Haripur, Abbottabad, Mansehra, Battagram, Besham, Pattan, Dasu, Chilas, Gilgit, Aliabad, Gulmit, Sust, Tashkurgan, Upal, Kashgar

Highway system
- Roads in Pakistan

Karakoram Highway

Chinese name
- Simplified Chinese: 喀喇昆仑公路
Transcriptions
Standard Mandarin
- Hanyu Pinyin: Kālākūnlún Gōnglù

The Karakoram Highway (Urdu: شاہراہِ قراقرم, Śāhirāh-i Qarāquram), also known as the KKH, National Highway 35 (Urdu: قومی شاہراہ ۳۵), N-35, and the China–Pakistan Friendship Highway, is a 1,300 km (810 mi) long national highway which extends from Hasan Abdal in the Punjab province of Pakistan to the Khunjerab Pass in Gilgit-Baltistan, where it crosses into China and becomes China National Highway 314.

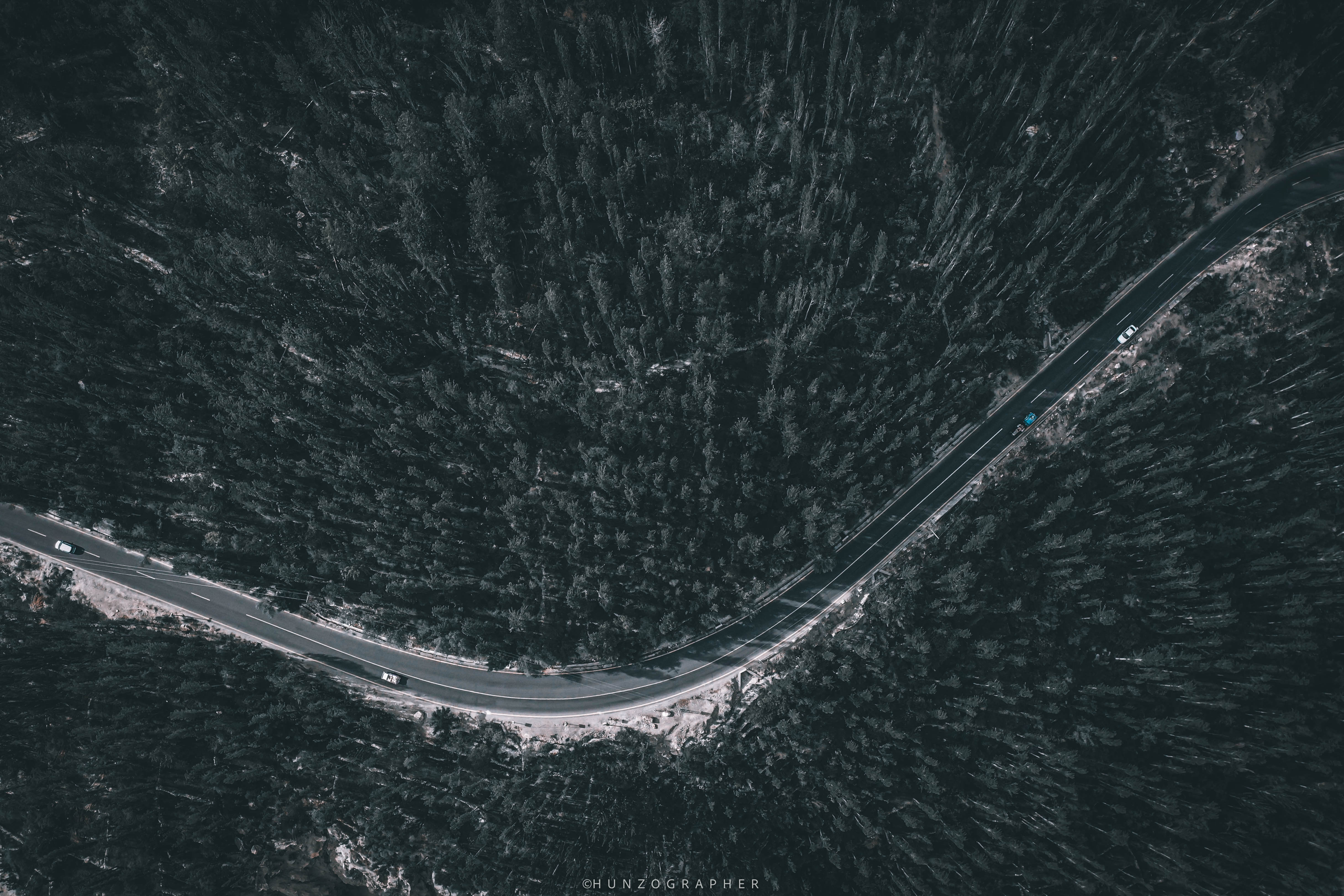
Aerial View of the Karakoram Highway in 2021

The highway connects the Pakistani provinces of Punjab and Khyber Pakhtunkhwa as well as Gilgit-Baltistan with China's Xinjiang Uyghur Autonomous Region. The highway is a popular tourist attraction and is one of the highest paved roads in the world, passing through the Karakoram mountain range, at at maximum elevation of 4,714 m (15,466 ft) near Khunjerab Pass. (Note: It can be argued that the Chile Route 27 is international since it connects to Argentina and it is 4,810 m (15,780 ft).) Due to its high elevation and the difficult conditions under which it was constructed, it is sometimes referred to as the Eighth Wonder of the World. The highway is also a part of the Asian Highway AH4.

== History ==
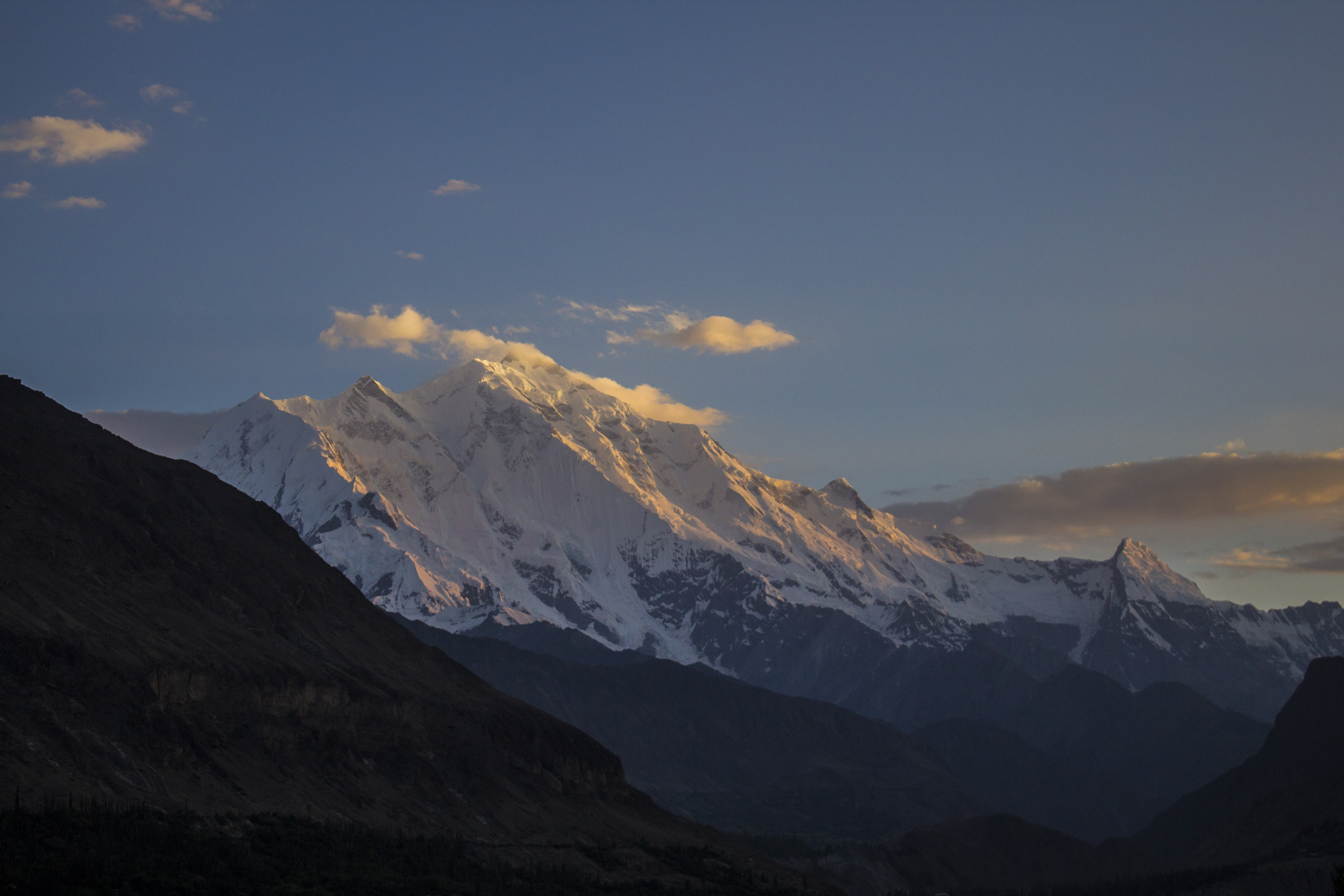
View of Rakaposhi along Karakoram Highway in 2014

The Karakoram Highway (KKH), also known as the Friendship Highway in China, was jointly constructed by the governments of China and Pakistan. It was started in 1962, completed in 1979 and opened to the public in 1986. Pakistan initially favored routing through Mintaka Pass. In 1966, China, citing the fact that Mintaka would be more susceptible to air strikes, recommended the steeper Khunjerab Pass instead. About 810 Pakistanis and about 200 Chinese workers died, mostly in landslides and falls, while building the highway. Over 140 Chinese workers who died during the construction are buried in the Chinese cemetery in Gilgit. The route of the KKH traces one of the many paths of the ancient Silk Road.

On the Pakistani side, the road was constructed by FWO (Frontier Works Organisation), employing the Pakistan Army Corps of Engineers. The Engineer-in-Chief's Branch of the Pakistani Army completed a project documenting the history of the highway. The book History of Karakoram Highway was written by Brigadier (Retired) Muhammad Mumtaz Khalid in two volumes. In the first volume, the author discusses the land and the people, the pre-historic communication system in the Northern Areas, the need for an all-weather road link with Gilgit, and the construction of Indus Valley Road. The second volume records events leading to the conversion of the Indus Valley Road to the Karakoram Highway, the difficulties in its construction, and the role of the Pakistan Army Corps of Engineers and their Chinese counterparts in its construction.

== The Highway ==
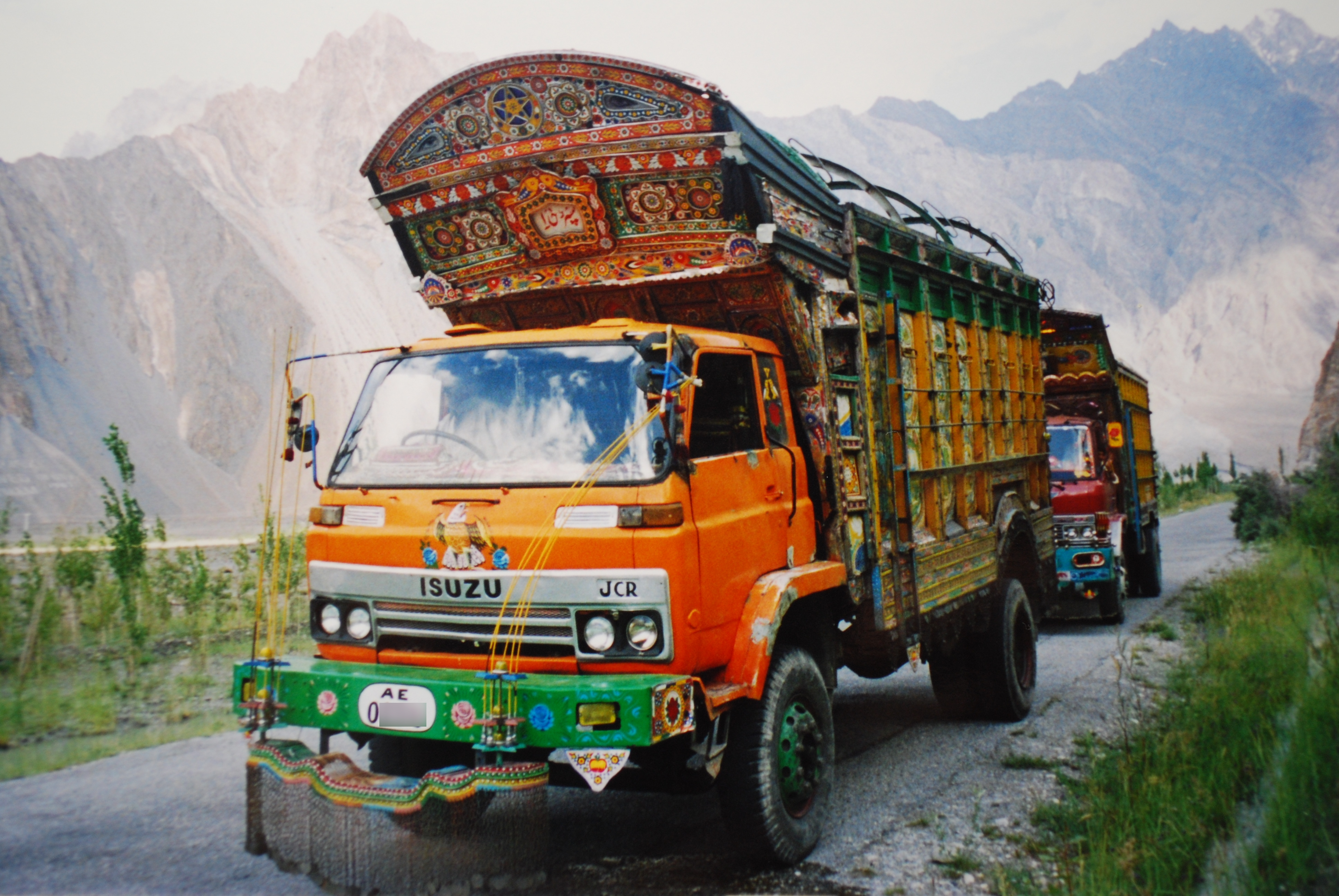
Jingle trucks on the Karakoram Highway in 2001

The highway, connecting the Gilgit–Baltistan region to the ancient Silk Road, runs approximately 1,300 km (810 mi) from Kashgar, a city in the Xinjiang region of China, to Abbottabad, of Pakistan. An extension of the highway southwest from Abbottabad, in the form of the N-35 highway, meets the Grand Trunk Road, N-5, at Hasan Abdal, Pakistan.

The highway cuts through the collision zone between the Eurasian Plate and Indian Plate, where China, Tajikistan, Afghanistan, and Pakistan come within 250 km (160 mi) of each other. Owing largely to the extremely sensitive state of the Kashmir conflict between India and Pakistan, the Karakoram Highway has strategic and military importance to these nations, but particularly Pakistan and China.

On 30 June 2006, a memorandum of understanding was signed between the Pakistani National Highway Authority (NHA) and China's State-owned Assets Supervision and Administration Commission (SASAC) to rebuild and upgrade the Karakoram Highway. According to SASAC, the width will be expanded from 10 to 30 m (33 to 98 ft), and its transport capacity will be increased three times its current capacity. In addition, the upgraded road will be designed to particularly accommodate heavy-laden vehicles and extreme weather conditions.

China and Pakistan are planning to link the Karakoram Highway to the southern port of Gwadar in Balochistan through the Chinese-aided Gwadar-Dalbandin railway, which extends to Rawalpindi.

On 4 January 2010, the KKH was closed in the Hunza Valley, eliminating through traffic to China except by small boats. A massive landslide 15 km (9.3 mi) upstream from Hunza's capital of Karimabad created the potentially unstable Attabad Lake, which reached 22 km (14 mi) in length and over 100 m (330 ft) in depth by the first week of June 2010 when it finally began flowing over the landslide dam. The landslide destroyed parts of villages while killing many inhabitants. The subsequent lake displaced thousands and inundated over 20 km (12 mi) of the KKH, including the 310 m (1,020 ft) long KKH bridge 4 km (2.5 mi) south of Gulmit.

It is highly questionable whether the lake, which reached 27 km (17 mi) in length in 2011, will drain. Goods from and to further north were transported over the lake by small vessels, to be reloaded onto trucks at the other end. In July 2012, Pakistan began constructing a revised route around the lake at a higher elevation with five new tunnels, with a total length of 7.12 km and two new bridges. The work was contracted out to the China Road & Bridge Corporation (CRBC) and was completed in September 2015.

=== Pakistani section ===
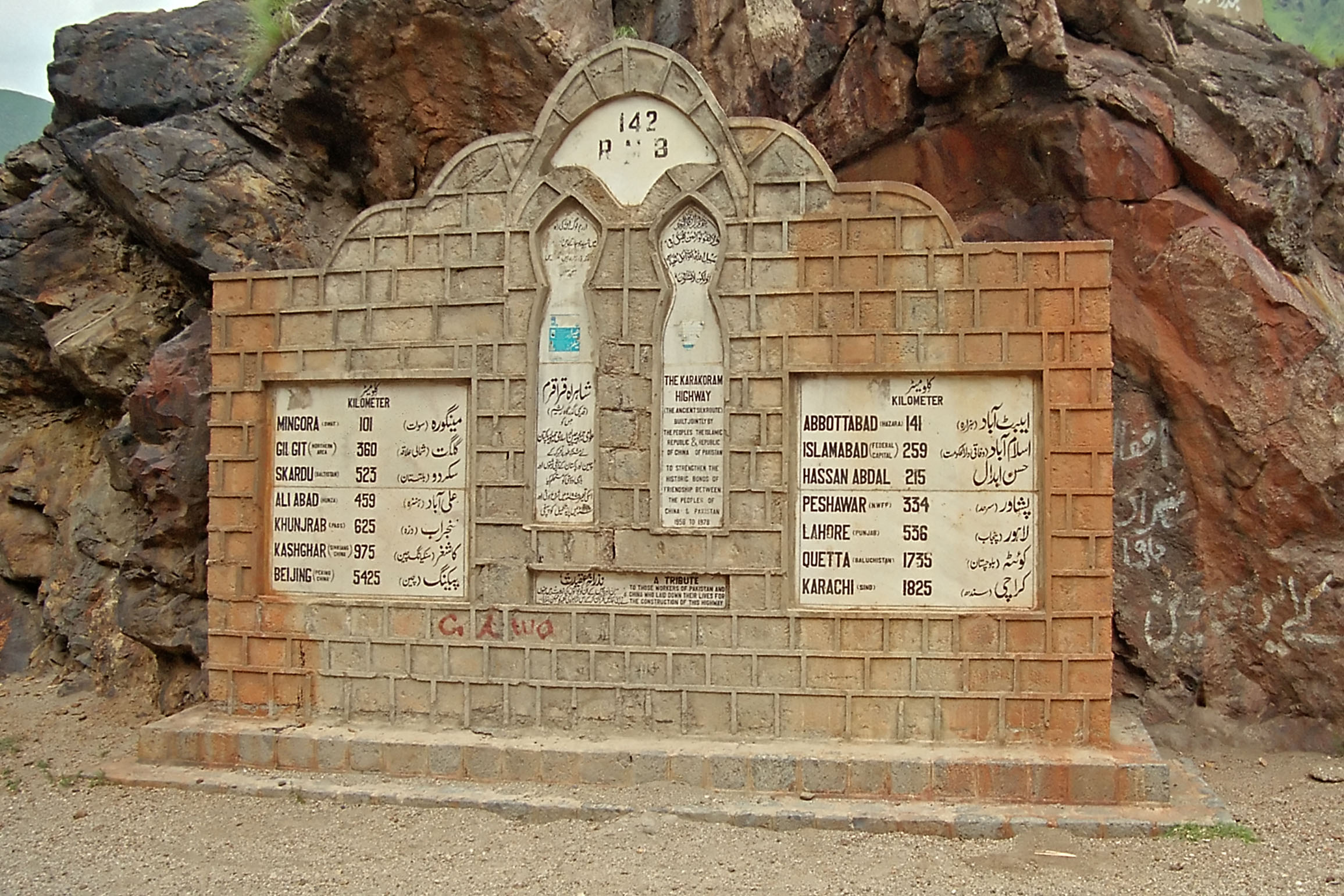
Milestone near Besham in Pakistan.

At 806 km (501 mi) in length, the Pakistani section of the highway starts at Abbottabad, although the N-35 of which KKH is now part, officially starts from Hasan Abdal. The highway meets the Indus River at Thakot and continues along the river until Jaglot, where the Gilgit River joins the Indus River. The Baltistan Highway links Skardu to Karakoram Highway at Jaglot. This is where three great mountain ranges meet: the Hindukush, the Himalayas, and the Karakoram. The western end of the Himalayas, marked by the ninth highest peak in the world, Nanga Parbat, can be seen from the highway. The highway passes through the capital of Gilgit–Baltistan, Gilgit, and continues through the valleys of Nagar and Hunza, along the Hunza River. Some of the highest mountains and famous glaciers in Karakoram can be seen in this section. The highway meets the Pakistani-Chinese border at Khunjerab Pass.

=== Chinese section ===
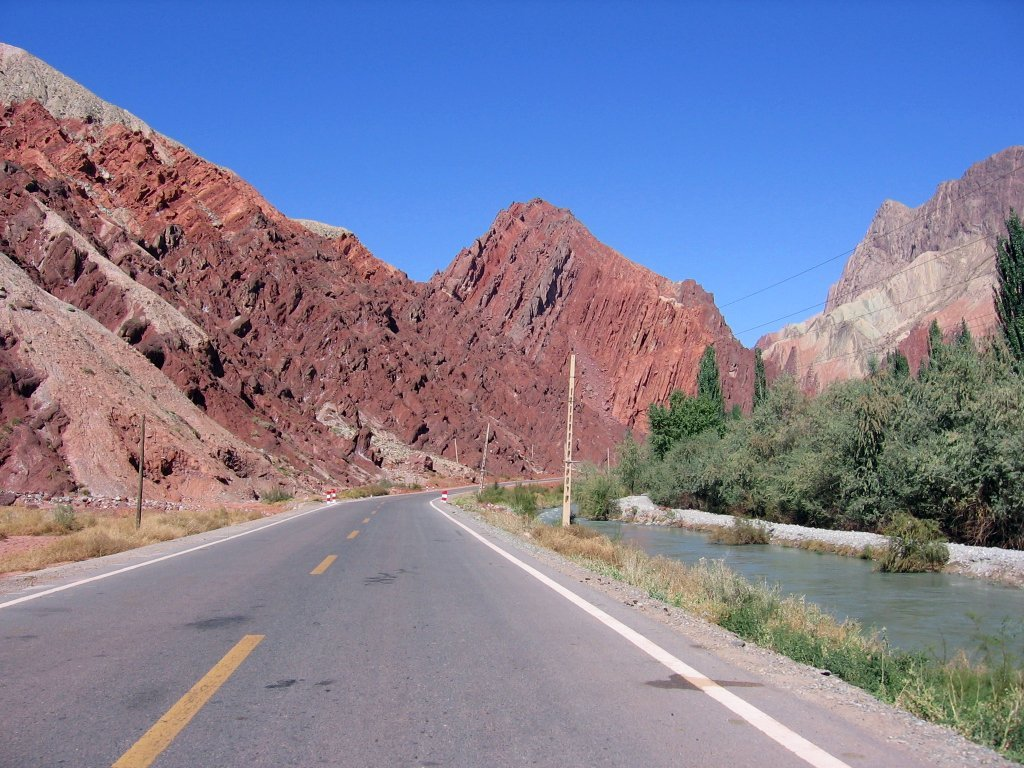
The Karakoram Highway in the Xinjiang region of China.

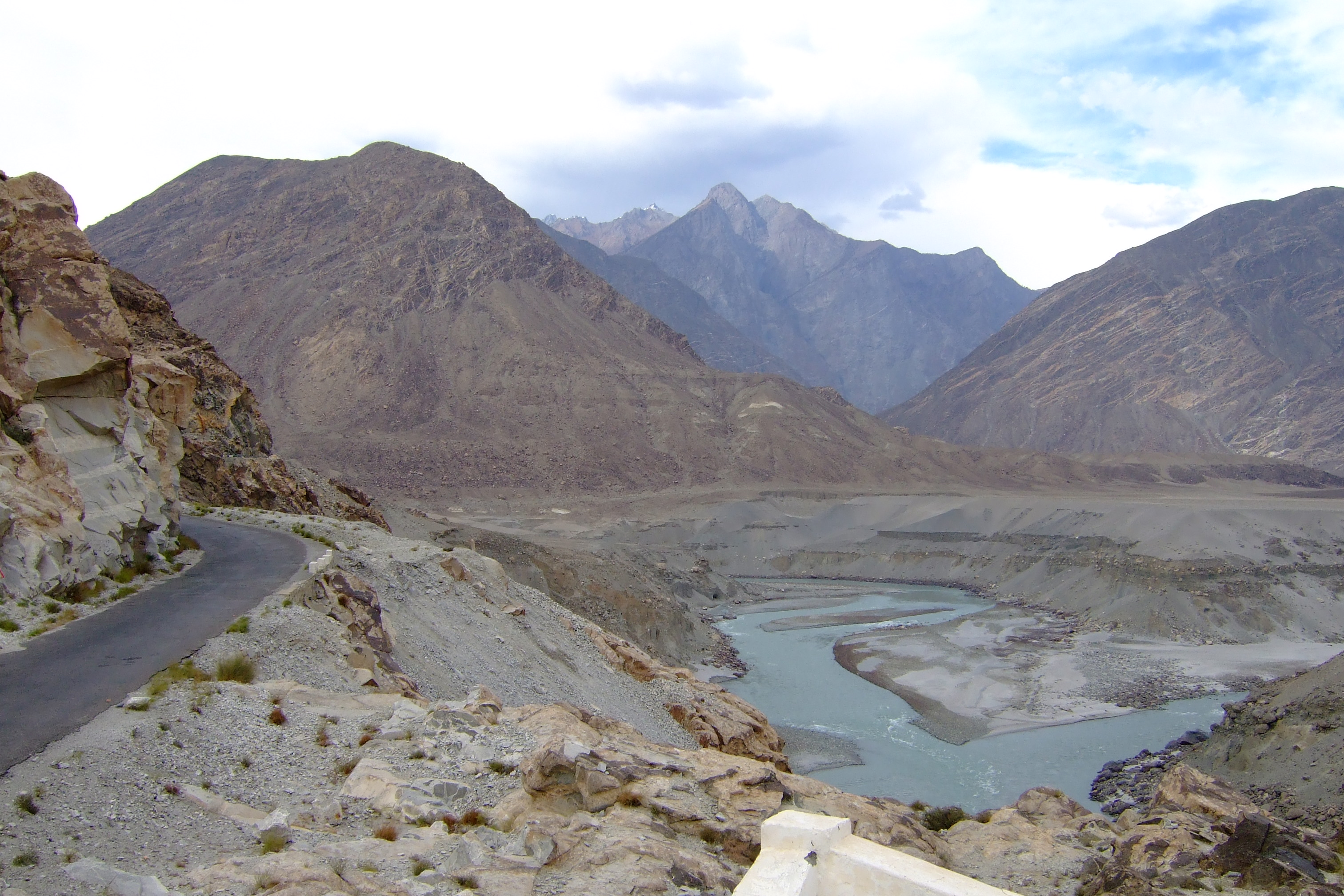
Karakoram Highway near Juglot, where three mountain ranges meet

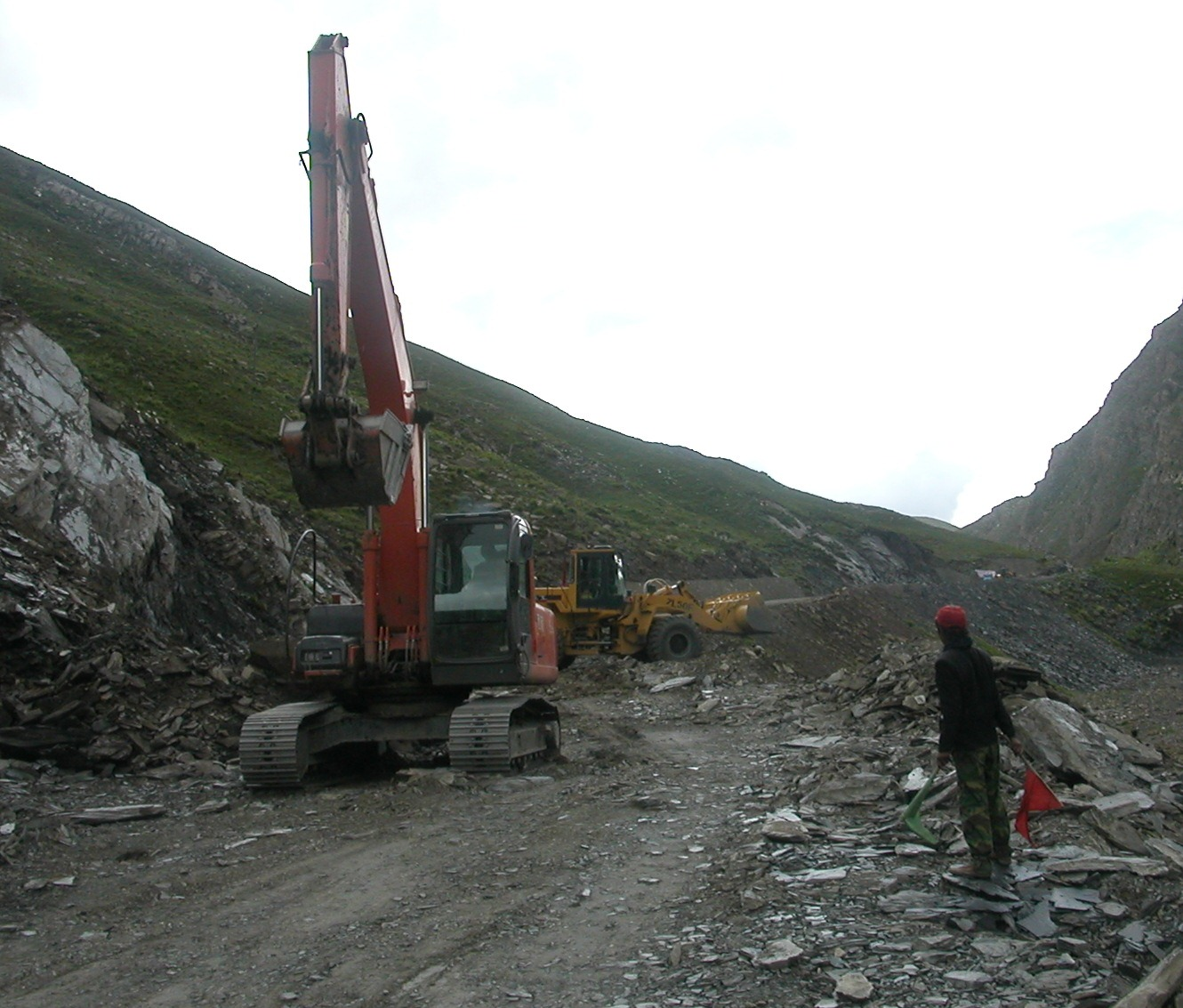
Construction of Karakorum Highway, Chinese section, August 2005

The Chinese section of the Karakoram Highway follows the north-south Sarykol ("Yellow Lake") valley just west of the Tarim Basin. The road from Kashgar goes southwest about 80 km (50 mi) and then turns west to enter the Gez (Ghez) River canyon between Chakragil mountain on the north and Kongur Tagh mountain on the south. From the Gez canyon the population becomes Kirgiz. Having climbed up to the valley, the road turns south past Kongur, Karakul Lake, and Muztagh Ata on the east. Below Muztagh Ata, a new road goes west over the Kulma Pass to join the Pamir Highway in Gorno-Badakhshan, Tajikistan. The main road continues over a low pass (where the population becomes Tajik) and descends to Tashkurgan. Further south, a valley and jeep track leads west toward the Wakhjir Pass to the Wakhan Corridor. Next the road turns west to a checkpost and small settlement at Pirali, and then the Khunjerab Pass, beyond which is Pakistan, the Khunjerab River and Hunza.

=== Major towns near Karakoram Highway ===
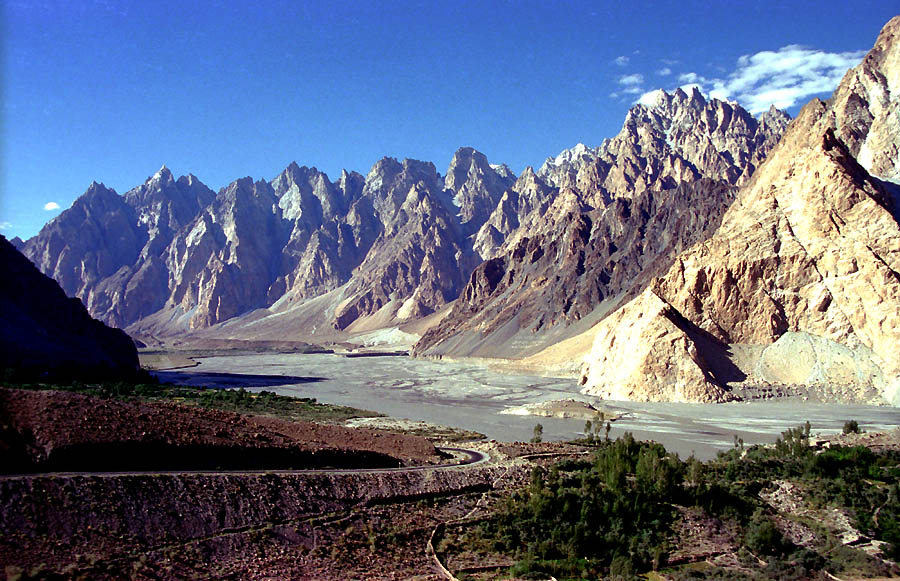
KKH passing through Passu in Pakistan.

- Rawalpindi/Islamabad, Pakistan railhead, 1,676 mm (5 ft 6 in) gauge
- Hassan Abdal
- Haripur
- Abbottabad
- Mansehra
- Battagram
- Besham
- Pattan
- Kohistan
- Dasu
- Chilas
- Juglot
- Gilgit
- Nagar
- Aliabad
- Gulmit
- Sust
- Dafdar (China)
- Tashkurgan (China)
- Oytak (China)
- Upal (China)
- Kashgar, Chinese railhead, 1,435 mm (4 ft 8+1/2 in) gauge

== Karakoram Highway reconstruction ==
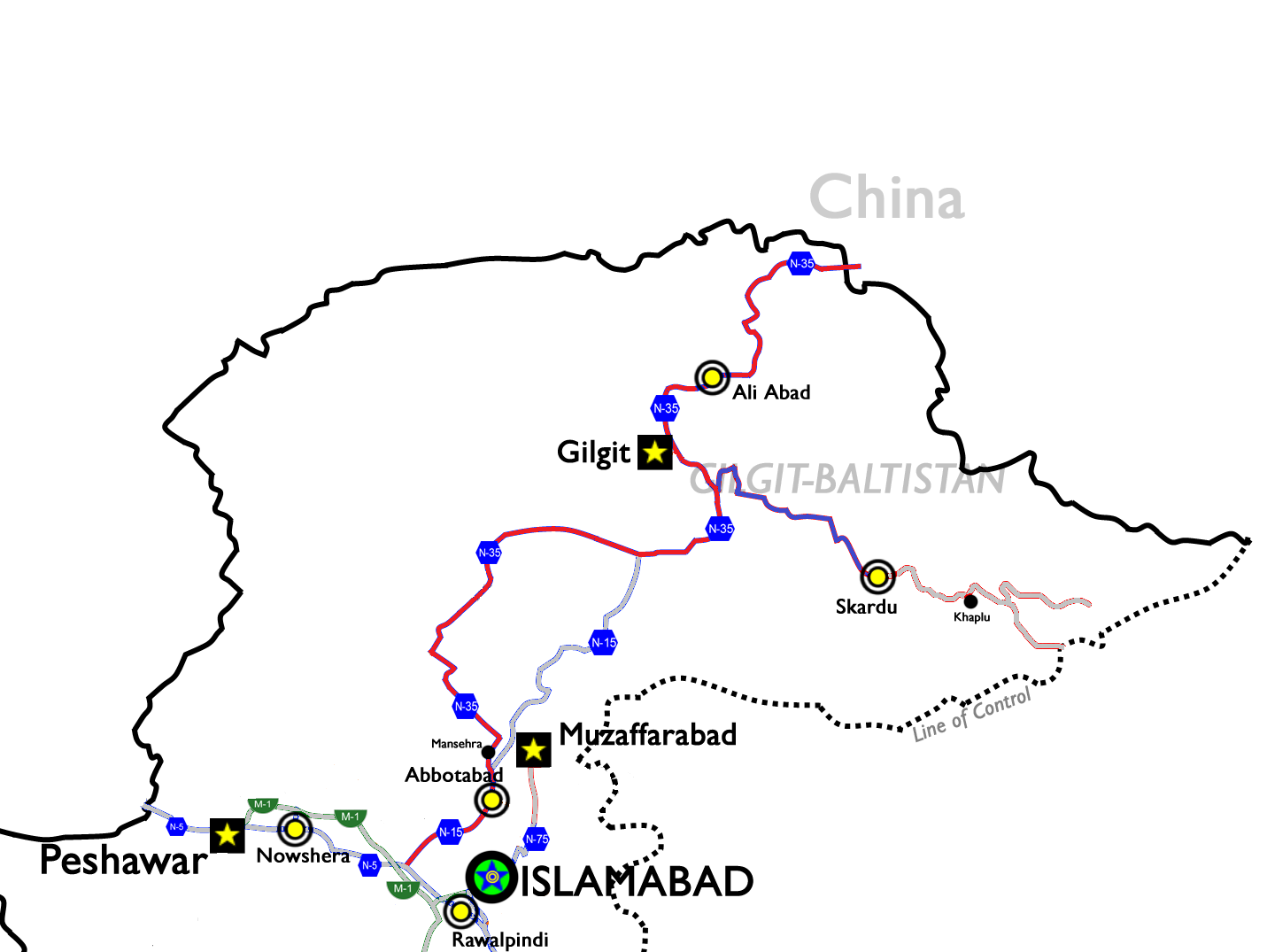
Highlighted in red is the route of National Highway 35, which is to be completely rebuilt and upgraded under the CPEC agreement. Highlighted in blue is the 175 km (109 mi) road between Gilgit and Skardu which is to be upgraded to a four-lane highway.

As part of the $46 billion China Pakistan Economic Corridor, reconstruction and upgrade works on the Pakistani portion of the Karakoram Highway (KKH) are underway. The KKH spans the 806 km (501 mi) long distance between the China-Pakistan border and the town of Hasan Abdal. At Burhan Interchange near Hasan Abdal, the existing M1 motorway will intersect the Karakoram Highway. From there, access onwards to Islamabad and Lahore continues as part of the existing M1 and M2 motorways, while Hasan Abdal will also be at intersection of the Eastern Alignment, and the Western Alignment which will lead towards the port city of Gwadar.

=== Karakoram Highway Realignment (China-Pakistan Friendship Tunnels) ===
A large section of the highway was damaged by a landslide in 2010 that created Attabad Lake. The resulting landslides cut off both the Hunza River and Karakoram Highway resulting in the formation of the reservoir. Prior to the completion of the bypass, all vehicular traffic had to be loaded onto boats to traverse the new reservoir. Construction of the tunnels began in 2012 and required 36 months for completion. The 24 km (15 mi) long series of bridges and tunnels was inaugurated on 15 September 2015 at a cost of $275 million and was hailed as a major accomplishment. The route comprises five tunnels and several bridges. The longest tunnel is 3,360 m (11,020 ft), followed by 2,736 m (8,976 ft), 435 m (1,427 ft), 410 m (1,350 ft) and 195 m (640 ft), while the Shishkat Great Bridge on Hunza River is 1,480 m (4,860 ft) long. The realignment restored the road link between Pakistan and China.

== Tourism ==
In recent years the highway has become a 'niche' adventure tourism destination. Owing to the improved security situation in the country, the number of foreign tourists coming to Pakistan has more than tripled since 2013, standing at 1.75 million in 2016.

Among the tourist destinations in the country, KKH is deemed as the "third best" by The Guardian. BBC Travel cited its popularity to some as "the 8th wonder of the world", while also noting its negative impact on local environment and culture.

The road has given mountaineers and cyclists easier access to the many high mountains, glaciers, and lakes in the area. The highway provides access to Gilgit and Skardu from Islamabad by road. These are the two major hubs for mountaineering expeditions in the Gilgit–Baltistan region of Pakistan administered Kashmir.

The Gilgit–Baltistan Administration of Pakistan-administered Kashmir and the Xinjiang Administration of China have signed an agreement to issue border passes to their permanent residents. This pass is valid for a calendar year and is used to travel through Khunjerab Pass only. Karakoram Highway has been described as one of the most beautiful destinations in the world. KKH provides a cross country road trip from Hasan Abdal, Pakistan to Kashgar.

Naltar Valley is one of the most scenic valleys accessed via Karakoram Highway. The valley offers snow clad mountains, sky high peaks, alpine ski slopes, high altitude lakes, glaciers and mountain passes. Bishgiri Lake is one of the highest lakes in Pakistan. While Pakora Pass is famous for its glaciers and meadows.

=== Mountains and glaciers ===
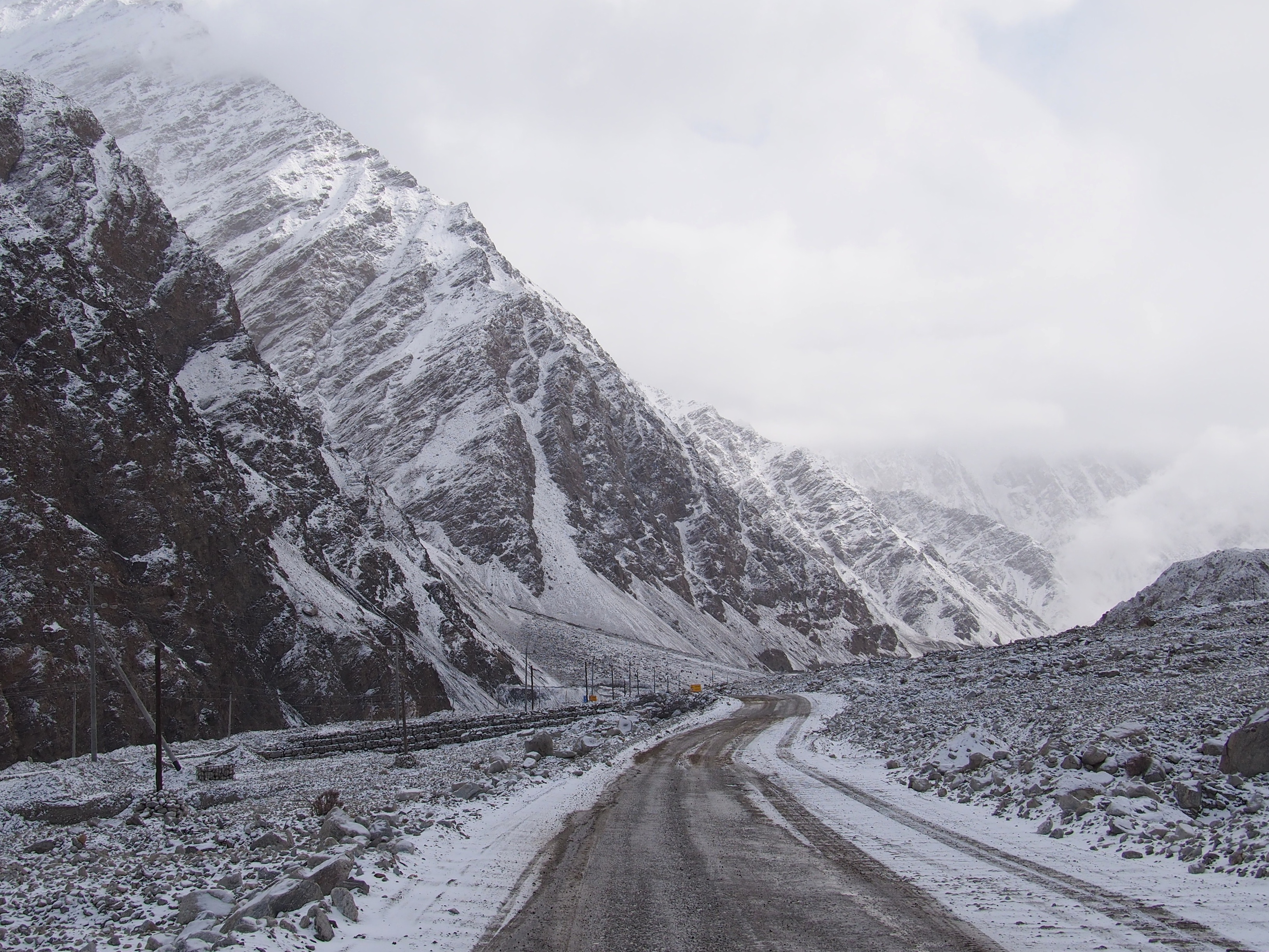
Karakoram Highway in Akto County, Xinjiang

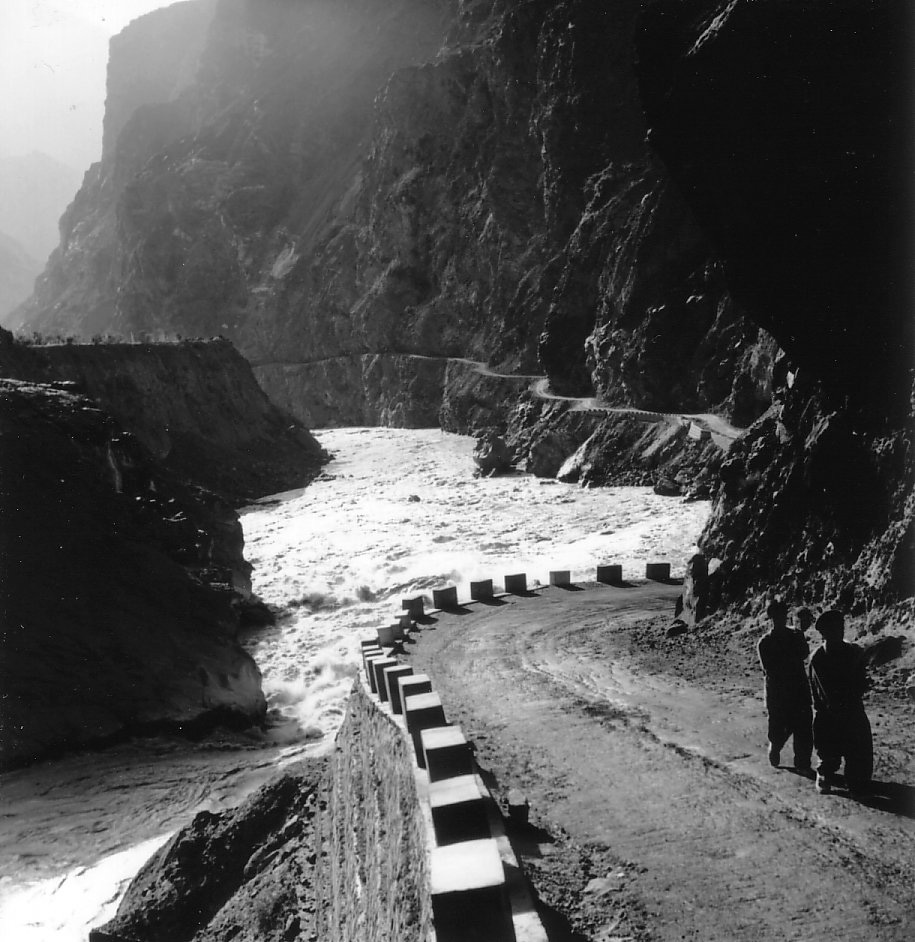
KKH along the Indus River, 2001.

Karakoram Highway provides the pathway to expeditions for almost all peaks in Gilgit–Baltistan, Kashmir and several peaks in Xinjiang China. The region includes some of the world's largest glaciers like the Baltoro and Siachen Glaciers. Two of the Eight-thousanders (mountains taller than 8,000 m (26,000 ft)) of the world that are in Pakistan are accessible by the highway. The notable mountains that can be directly seen while travelling on the highway in Pakistan are:

- Nanga Parbat, Gilgit–Baltistan, 9th highest of the world at 8,126 m (26,660 ft)
- Rakaposhi, Gilgit–Baltistan, 27th highest of the world at 7,788 m (25,551 ft)
- Diran, Gilgit–Baltistan, most dangerous mountain in Pakistan
- Shispare, Gilgit–Baltistan
- Ultar Peak, Gilgit–Baltistan
- Tupopdan, Gilgit–Baltistan, also known as Cathedral Peaks near Passu

In China:

- Kongur Tagh, Xinjiang, highest peak of the Pamir Mountains at 7,649 m (25,095 ft)
- Muztagh Ata, Xinjiang, second-highest peak of the Pamir Mountains at 7,546 m (24,757 ft)

Many glaciers can be seen while travelling on the highway:

- Minapin Glacier
- Passu Glacier
- Ghulkin Glacier
- Khunjerab Glacier

=== Rivers and lakes ===
Several rivers and lakes are made accessible by the highway. These include:

- Indus River
- Hunza River
- Attabad Lake
- Gilgit River
- Khunjerab River
- Karakul Lake in Xinjiang (China)

=== Rock art and petroglyphs ===
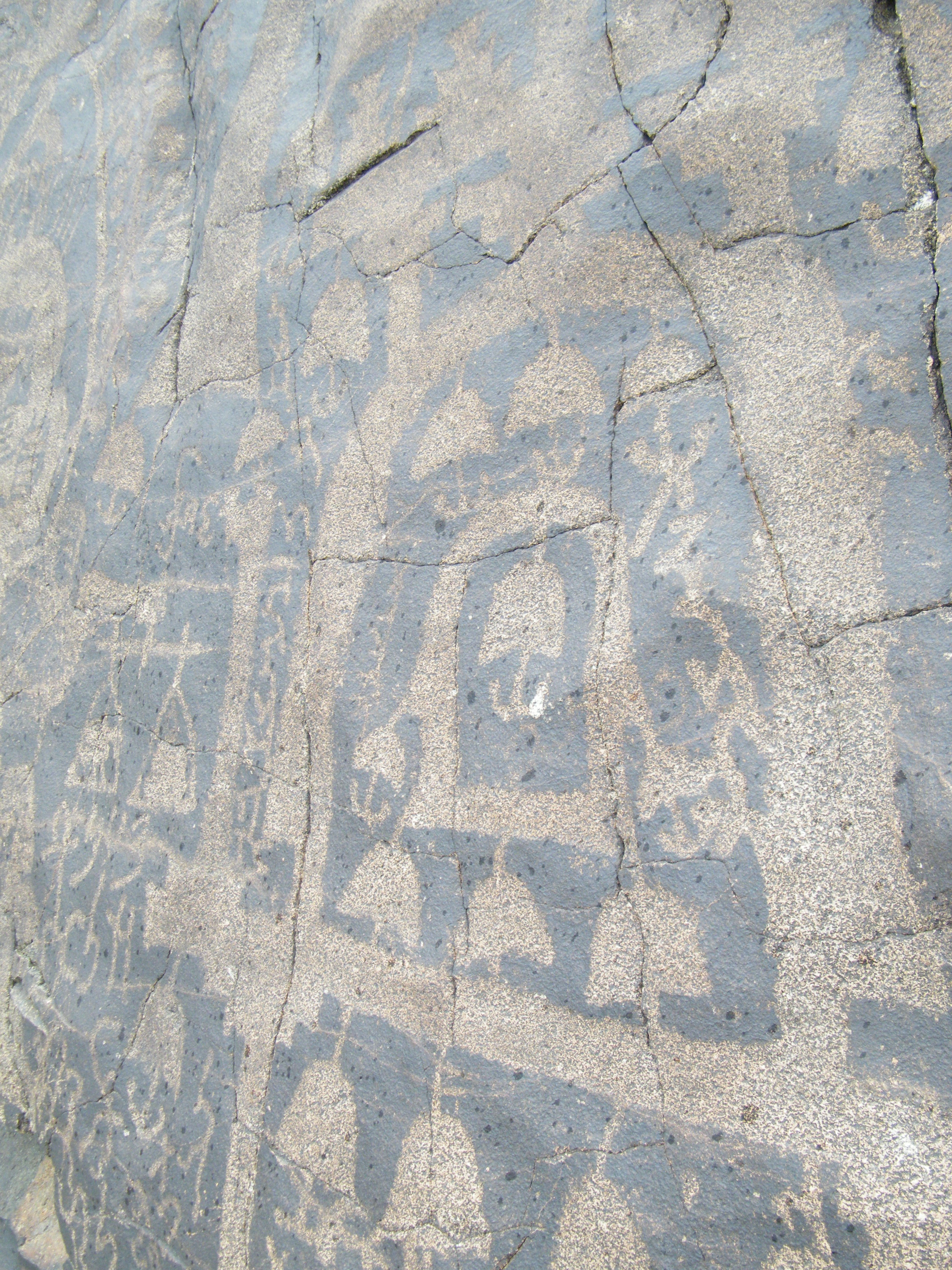
On the Karokoram Highway near Chilas.

There are more than 50,000 pieces of rock art and petroglyphs all along the highway that are concentrated at ten major sites between Hunza and Shatial. The carvings were left by invaders, traders, and pilgrims who passed along the trade route, as well as by locals. The earliest date back to between 5000 and 1000 BC, showing single animals, triangular men, and hunting scenes in which the animals are larger than the hunters. These carvings were pecked into the rock with stone tools and are covered with a thick patina that yields their age.

=== Travel ===
There are several transport companies in Pakistan that offer bus service between major towns of the highway from Rawalpindi and Lahore. The largest company is Northern Areas Transport Corporation (NATCO). Other companies are Masherbrum Travel, Silk Route Travel, K-2 movers, Anchan Travel, and Saeed Travel.

=== Bus service between Gilgit and Kashgar ===
On 1 June 2006, daily bus service began between Gilgit, Gilgit–Baltistan, and Kashgar, Xinjiang, through the Sust and Tashkorgan border area.

== Climate ==
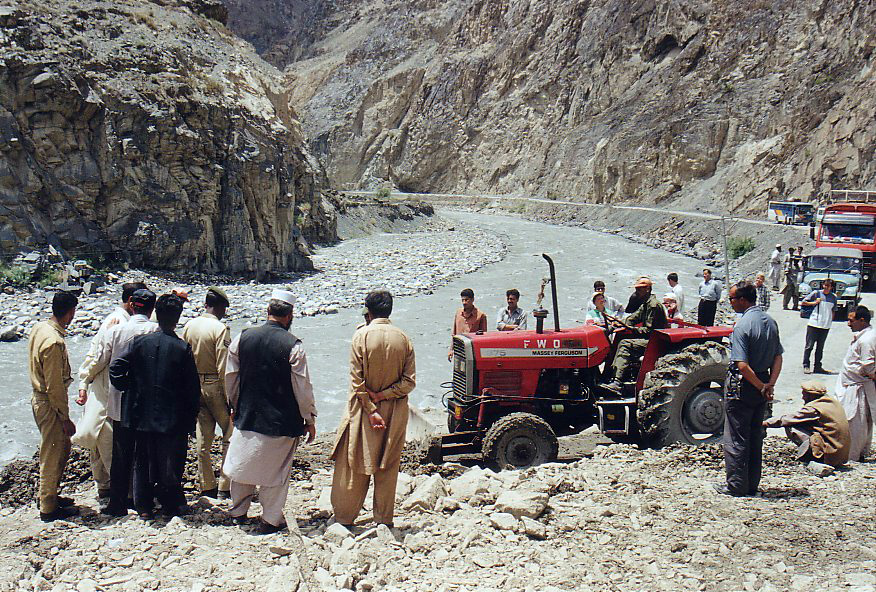
Landslides, particularly during the rainy season, sporadically disturb the traffic for several hours.

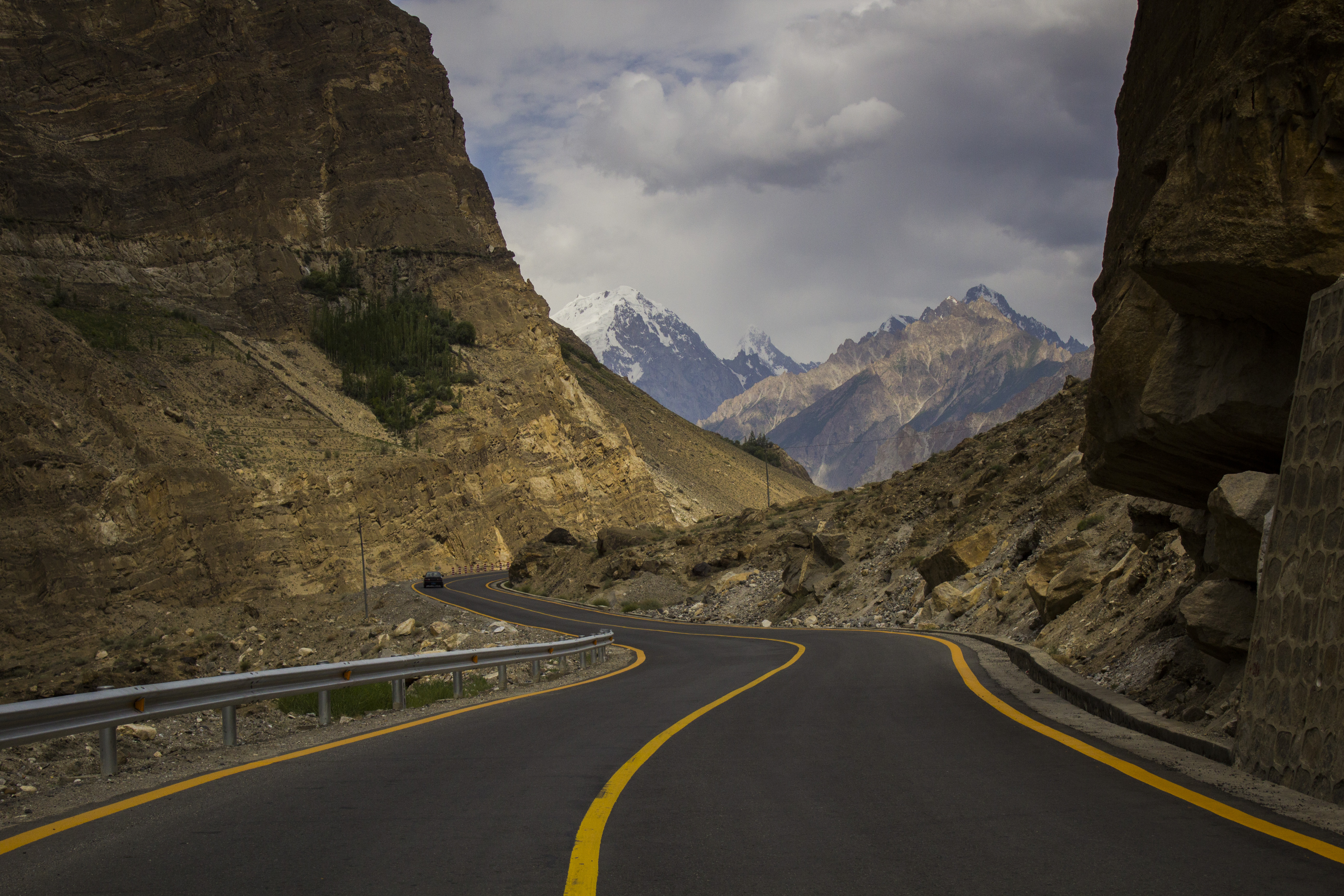
Karakoram Highway ahead of Juglot, Gilgit

The KKH is best travelled in the spring or early autumn. Heavy snow during harsh winters can shut the highway down for extended periods. Heavy monsoon rains around July and August cause occasional landslides that can block the road for hours or more.

== Alternate road (Xinjiang-GB-Azad Kashmir road) ==
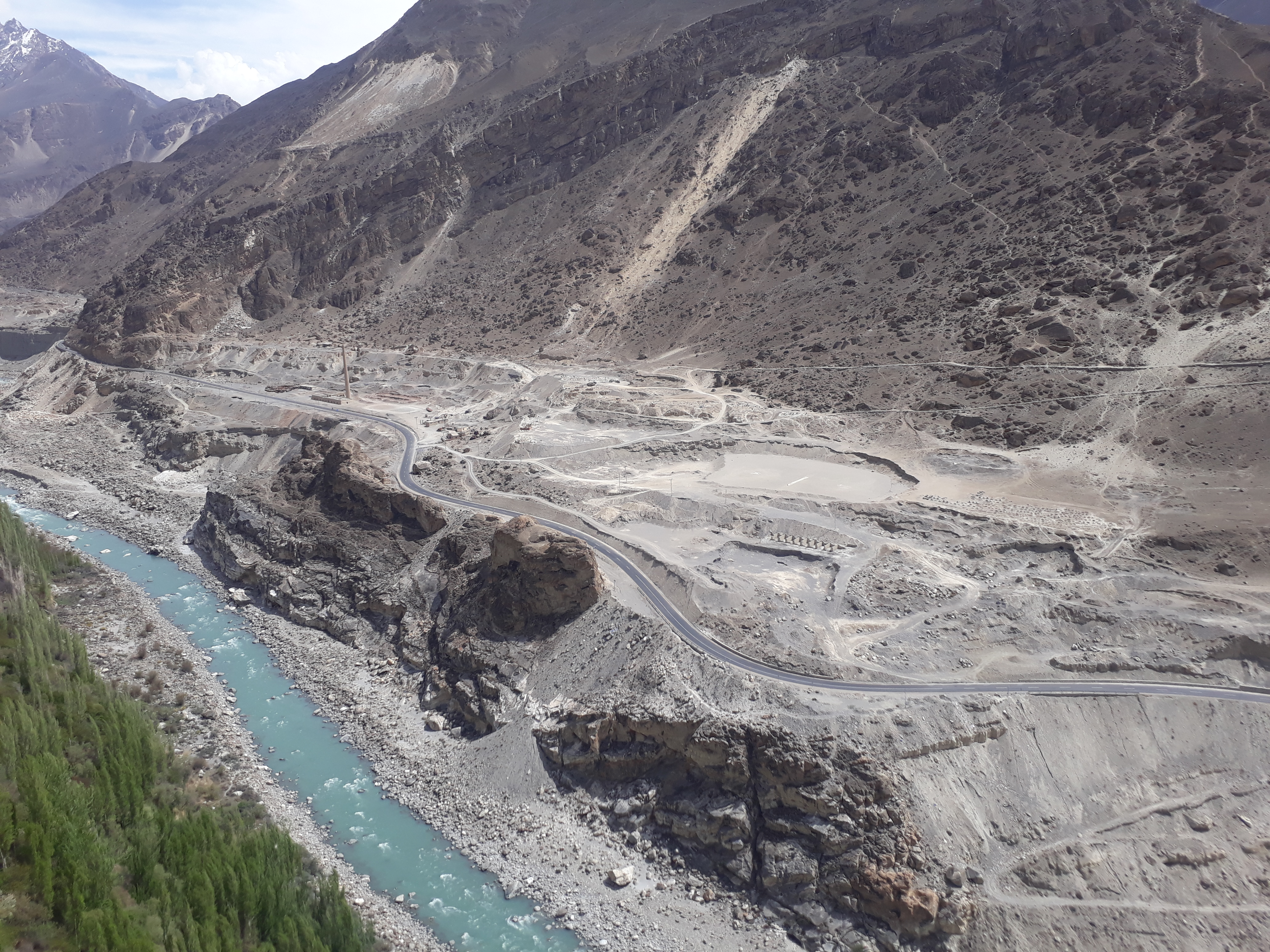
Karakoram Highway view from Altit fort, Hunza, Gilgit-Baltistan

The proposed Xinjiang-GB-Azad Kashmir road would be linked to Yarkant County in Xinjiang, and enter Gilgit-Baltistan through Mustagh Pass, 126 km west of Ladakh, crossing the major supply artery from the Karakoram Highway near Skardu city. From there, it would run south through the high-altitude Deosai Plateau to the Astore Valley. A road tunnel is proposed to be constructed through the mountains to connect Astore to the Neelum Valley in the Azad Kashmir region.

== See also ==
- Karakoram Pass
- National Highways of Pakistan
- Pamir Highway
- Safar Hai Shart
- Shandur
- Silk Road
