= Khunjerab Pass =

Mountain pass in Pakistan and China

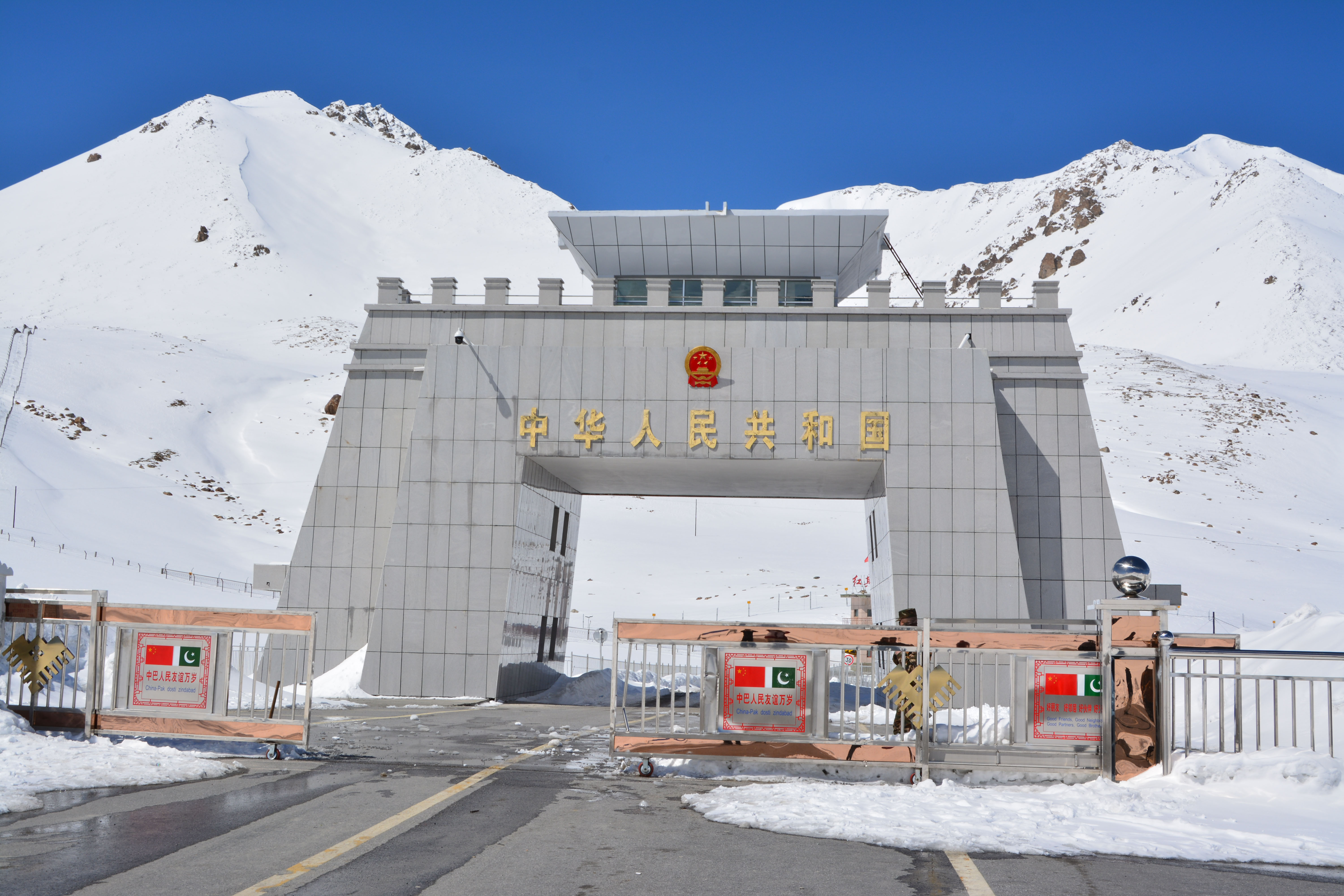
- Check post at the China–Pakistan border crossing on the Karakoram Highway

- Location within Southern Xinjiang Location within Gilgit Baltistan
- Interactive map of Khunjerab Pass
- Elevation: 4,693 m (15,397 ft)
- Traversed by: AH4 – G314; Karakoram Highway

Location
- Location: Hunza-15801, Pakistan – administered Gilgit–Baltistan / Xinjiang, China
- Range: Karakoram Range
- Coordinates: 36.85°N 75.4283°E

Khunjerab Pass

Chinese name
- Traditional Chinese: 紅其拉甫山口
- Simplified Chinese: 红其拉甫山口
Transcriptions
Standard Mandarin
- Hanyu Pinyin: hóngqílāfǔ shānkǒu

Khunjerab Pass (Chinese: 红其拉甫口岸; Urdu: درہ خنجراب; Uyghur: قونجىراپ ئېغىزى) is a mountain pass on the Karakoram Highway in Pakistani-administered Gilgit-Baltistan bordering Xinjiang Autonomous Region of China. It is a high-altitude mountain pass lying at an elevation of 4,693 metres (15,397 ft) above sea level in the Karakoram. It holds a significant strategic position on the northern border of Pakistan, specifically in the Gilgit-Baltistan's Hunza and Nagar districts. Additionally, it is positioned on the southwestern border of China with Pakistan, in the Xinjiang region.

Near Khunjerab Pass, there is another pass known as Mutsjliga Pass, which stands at an elevation of 5,314 metres (17,434 ft) and is located at approximately 36.97374°N 75.2973°E.

== Etymology ==
The word "خنجراب" in the local Wakhi language means 'waterfall house'. It is derived from two words, "خون"-"Khun" means house and "جراب"-"Jerab" means a creek coming from a spring or a waterfall.

== Notability ==
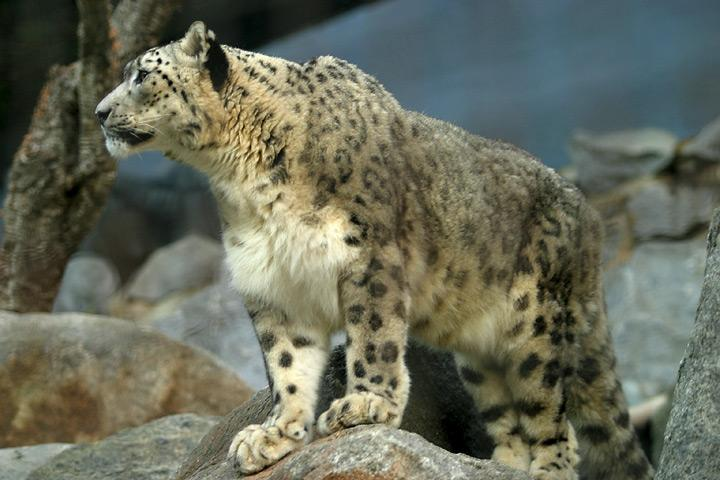
The snow leopard, an endangered species, is found in the Khunjerab National Park

The Khunjerab Pass holds several distinctions, including being the highest paved international border crossing globally and serving as the highest point along the Karakoram Highway. The construction of the road across this pass was completed in 1982, and it has since supplanted the previously unpaved Mintaka and Kilik passes as the principal route across the formidable Karakoram Range.

The decision to use the Khunjerab Pass for the Karakoram Highway was made in 1966. China, citing the fact that Mintaka would be more susceptible to air strikes, recommended the steeper Khunjerab Pass instead.

On the Pakistani-administered side, the pass is 42 km (26 mi) from the National Park station and checkpoint in Dih, 75 km (47 mi) from the customs and immigration post in Sost, 270 km (170 mi) from Gilgit, and 870 km (540 mi) from Islamabad.

On the Chinese side, the pass is the southwest terminus of China National Highway 314 (G314) and is 130 km (81 mi) from Tashkurgan, 420 km (260 mi) from Kashgar and 1,890 km (1,170 mi) from Urumqi. The Chinese port of entry is located 3.5 km (2.2 mi) along the road from the pass in Tashkurgan County.

The long, relatively flat pass is often snow-covered during the winter season and as a consequence is generally closed for heavy vehicles from 30 November to 1 May and for all vehicles from 30 December to 1 April. This is not set, however; late snowfall in the region attributed to climate change means the road is accessible even during the winter months. Depending on the amount of snowfall, the road is cleared from time periods ranging from days to weeks.

Since 1 June 2006, there has been a daily bus service across the boundary from Gilgit to Kashgar, Xinjiang.

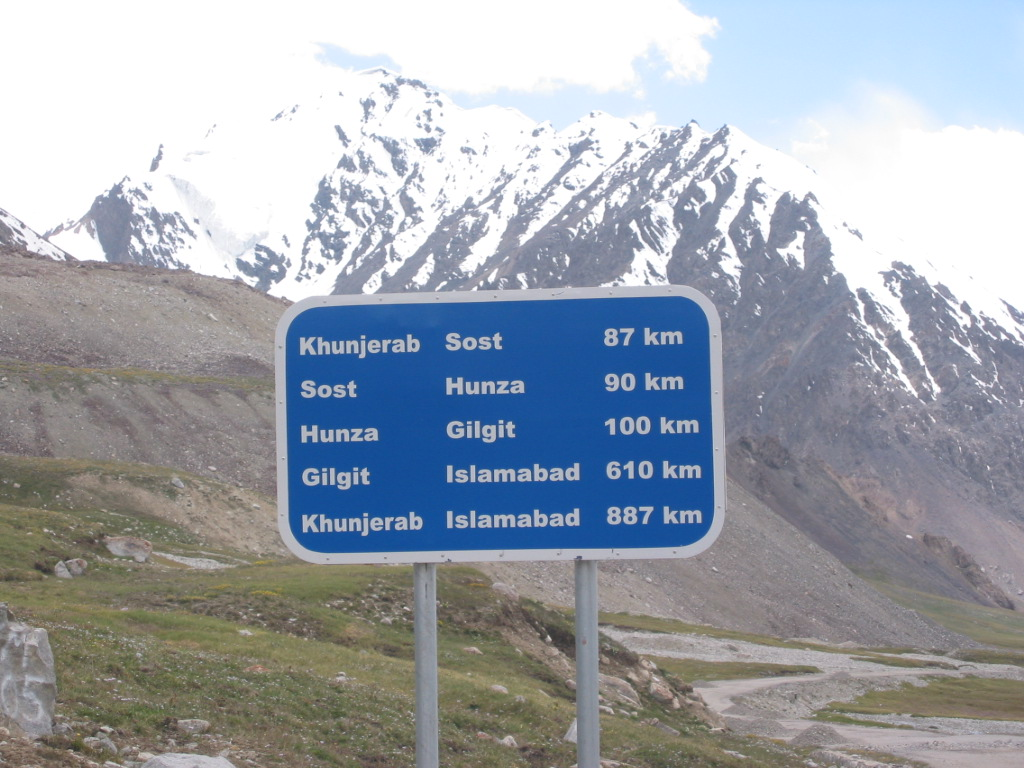
Road sign giving distances to cities in Pakistan

This is one of the international borders where left-hand traffic (Pakistan-administered Gilgit-Baltistan) changes to right-hand traffic (China) and vice versa.

=== Highest ATM in the world ===
The Pakistani side features the highest ATM in the world, administered by the National Bank of Pakistan and linked to China UnionPay and the domestic 1LINK switch.

== Railway ==
In 2007, consultants were hired to evaluate the construction of a railway through this pass to connect China with transport in Pakistan's Gilgit-Baltistan. A feasibility study started in November 2009 for a line connecting Havelian 750 km (466 mi) away in Khyber Pakhtunkhwa and Kashgar 350 km (217 mi) away in Xinjiang. However, no progress has been made thereafter and this project is also not part of the current CPEC plan.

== Gallery ==
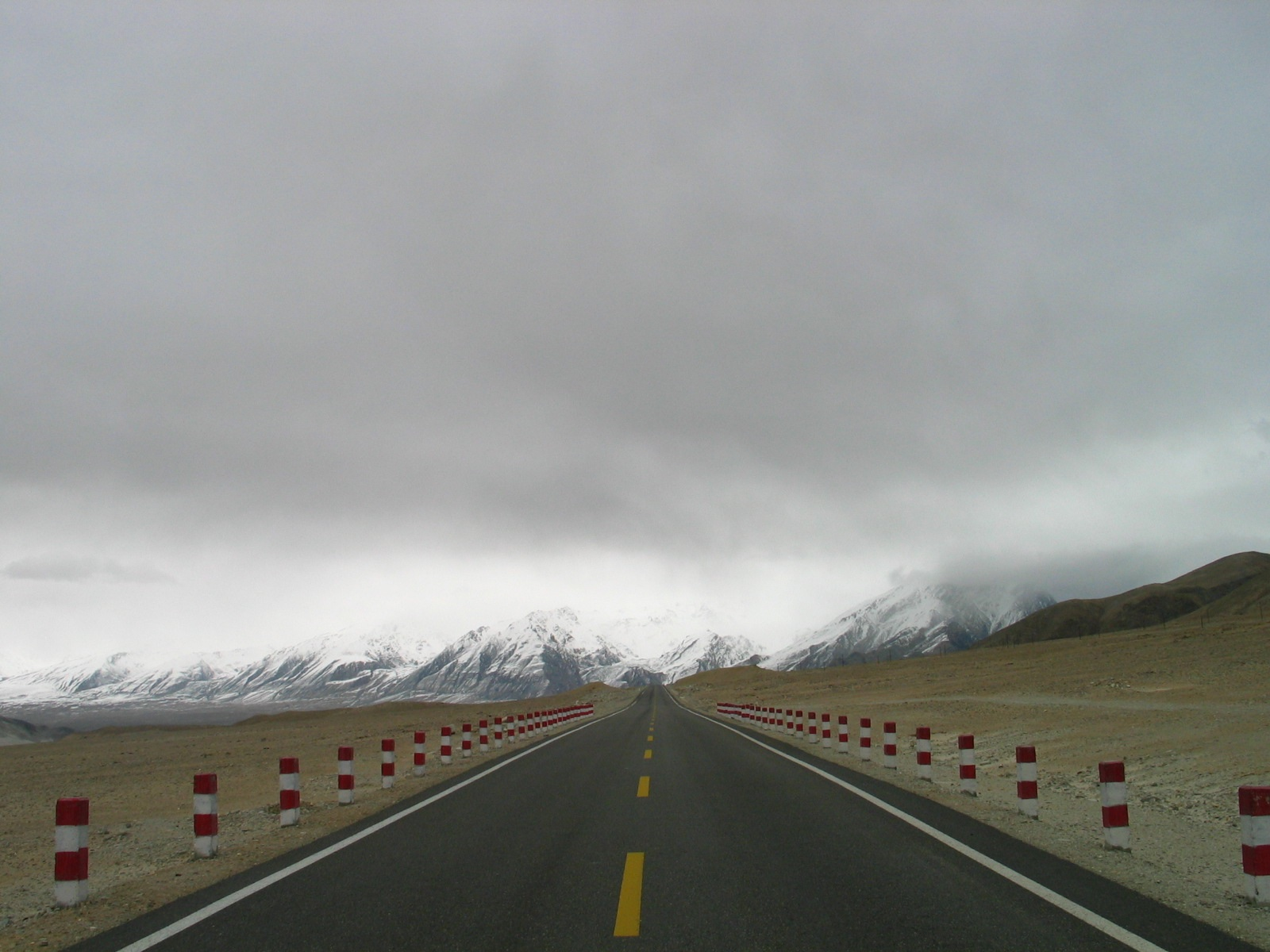
Karakoram Highway

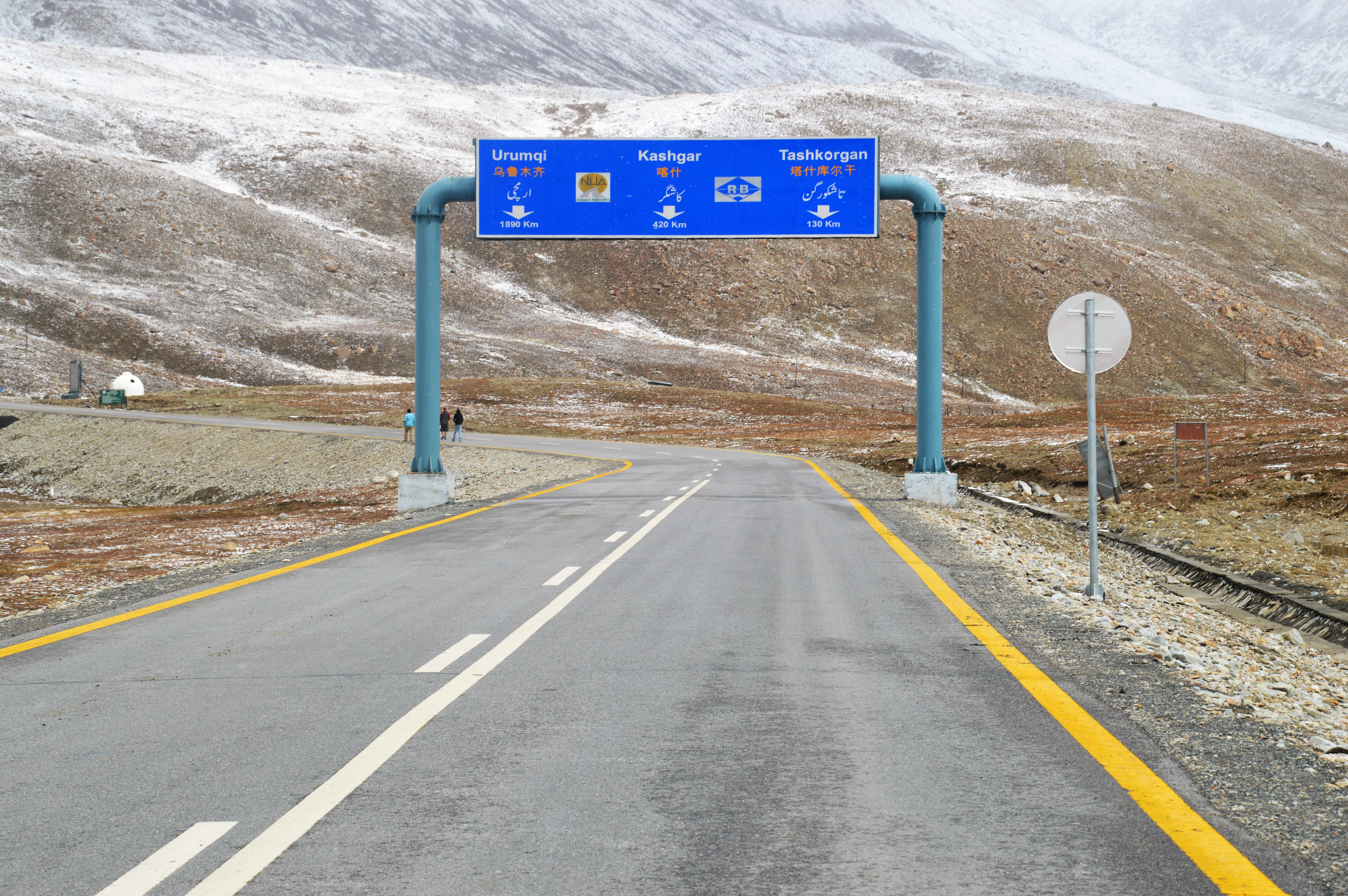
Khunjerab Pass Road

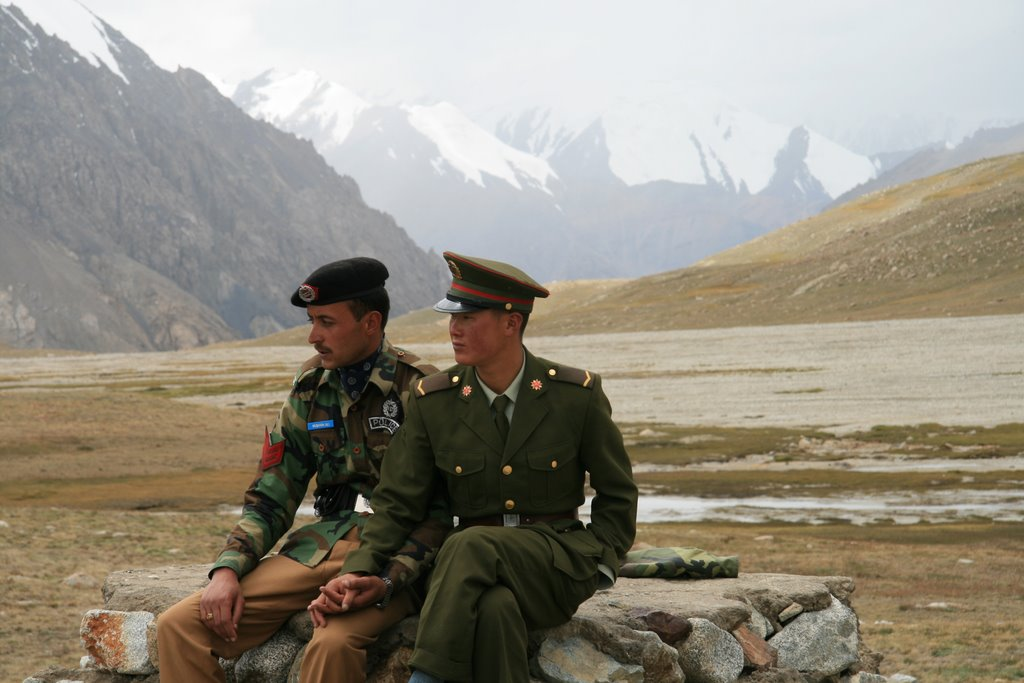
Chinese and Pakistani soldiers at Khunjerab Pass

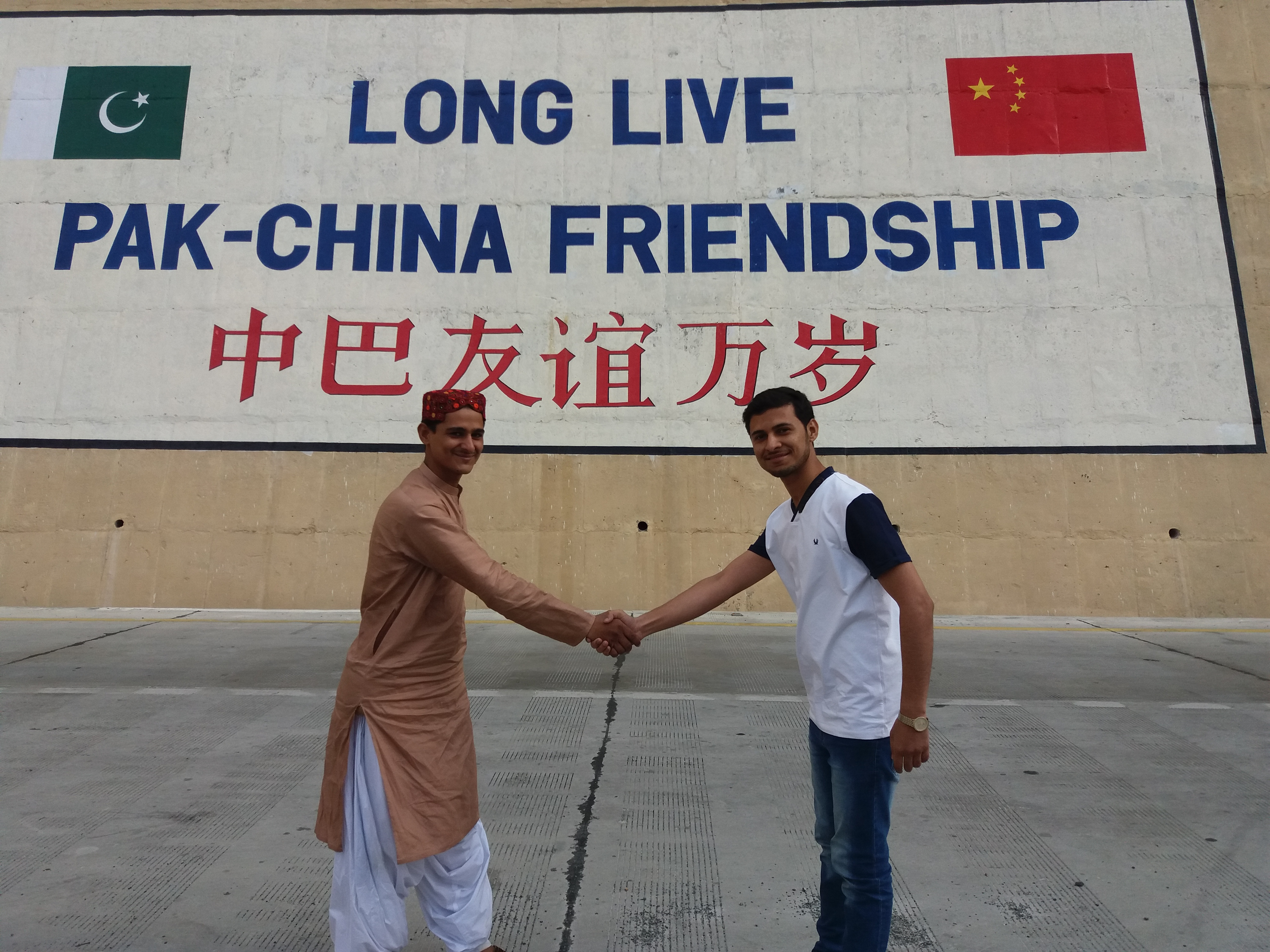
China–Pakistan friendship monument in Attabad, about 150 km from the border

== See also ==
- Mustagh Pass
- Sost
- Nathu La
- Abra del Acay
