= Dasu =

Dasu داسو Dassu
- District Headquarter
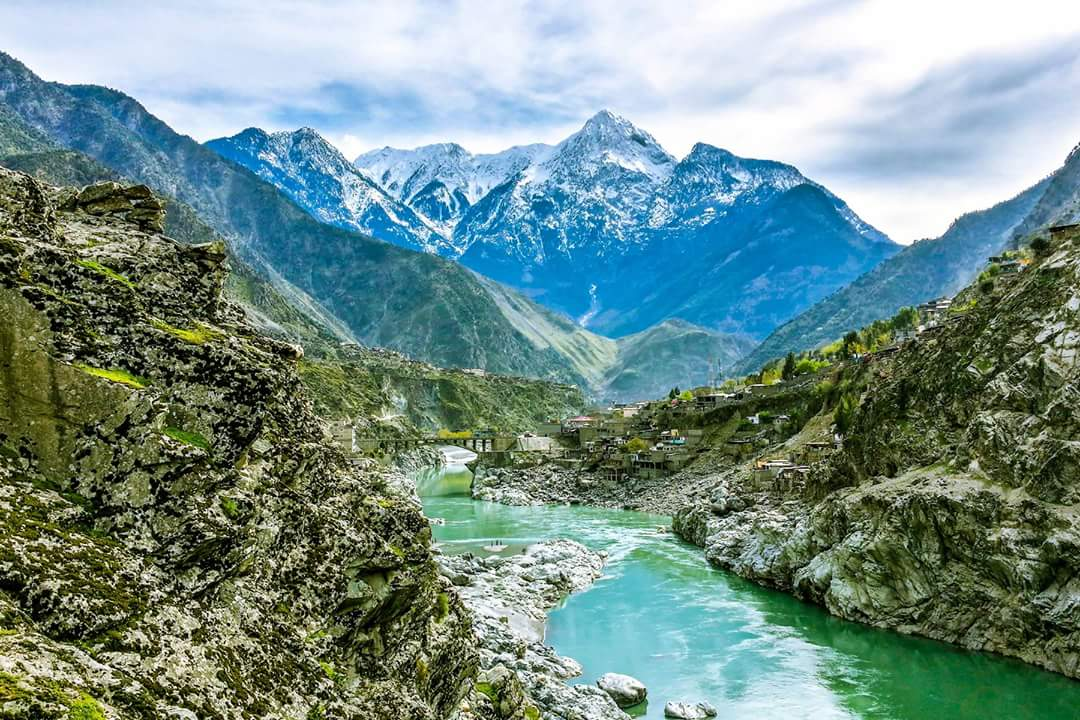
- Indus River between Dasu and Komila, with Karakoram Highway in the middle

- Location within Khyber Pakhtunkhwa Location within Pakistan
- Coordinates: 35°16′16″N 73°13′24″E
- Country: Pakistan
- Province: Khyber Pakhtunkhwa
- District: Upper Kohistan
- Tehsil: Dassu Tehsil
- Elevation: 841 m (2,759 ft)

Population (2017)
  - City: 2,372
- Time zone: UTC+5 (PST)

Dasu or Dassu (Shina and Urdu: داسو) is the district headquarters of the Upper Kohistan District of Khyber Pakhtunkhwa, Pakistan. It had fifteen union councils before the Kandia Valley was separated.

== Climate ==
With a mild and generally warm and temperate climate, Dasu features a humid subtropical climate (Cfa) under the Köppen climate classification. The average temperature in Dasu is 19.5 °C, while the annual precipitation averages 648 mm. Even in the driest months, there is a lot of precipitation. November is the driest month with 13 mm of precipitation, while July, the wettest month, has an average precipitation of 93 mm.

July is the hottest month of the year with an average temperature of 29.4 °C. The coldest month January has an average temperature of 7.7 °C.

Climate data for Dasu
Month	Jan	Feb	Mar	Apr	May	Jun	Jul	Aug	Sep	Oct	Nov	Dec	Year
Mean daily maximum °C (°F)	13.0 (55.4)	15.7 (60.3)	20.8 (69.4)	26.0 (78.8)	31.4 (88.5)	36.6 (97.9)	36.0 (96.8)	34.7 (94.5)	32.6 (90.7)	27.9 (82.2)	22.0 (71.6)	15.3 (59.5)	26.0 (78.8)
Daily mean °C (°F)	7.7 (45.9)	10.1 (50.2)	14.7 (58.5)	19.6 (67.3)	24.4 (75.9)	29.1 (84.4)	29.4 (84.9)	28.5 (83.3)	25.7 (78.3)	20.3 (68.5)	14.7 (58.5)	9.5 (49.1)	19.5 (67.1)
Mean daily minimum °C (°F)	2.5 (36.5)	4.6 (40.3)	8.7 (47.7)	13.3 (55.9)	17.4 (63.3)	21.7 (71.1)	22.9 (73.2)	22.3 (72.1)	18.8 (65.8)	12.8 (55.0)	7.5 (45.5)	3.7 (38.7)	13.0 (55.4)
Source: Climate-Data.org

== See also ==
- Dasu Dam
- Dasu bus attack
