= Dafdar =

Township in Xinjiang, China

Dafdar 达布达尔乡 (Chinese) دەفتەر يېزىسى (Uyghur) ذەۋذار دىيۇر (Sarikoli) دَڤدار دیار (Wakhi)
- Township
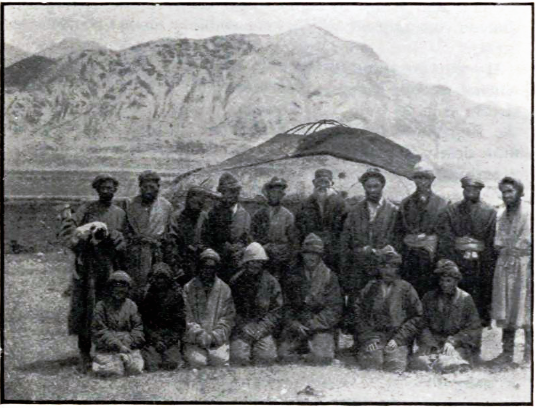
- Wakhis and Kyrgyz at Dafdar as photographed by Aurel Stein

- Location in Xinjiang
- Coordinates: 37.3427806°N 75.4063098°E
- Country: People's Republic of China
- Province: Xinjiang
- Prefecture: Kashgar Prefecture
- County: Tashkurgan Tajik Autonomous County

Area
  - Total: 11,400 km^{2} (4,400 sq mi)
- Elevation: 3,700 m (12,100 ft)

Population (2010)
  - Total: 2,718
  - Density: 0.238/km^{2} (0.618/sq mi)

Ethnic groups
  - Major ethnic groups: Chinese Tajiks, Kyrgyz
- Time zone: UTC+8 (China Standard Time)

Dafdar

Chinese name
- Simplified Chinese: 达布达尔乡
- Traditional Chinese: 達布達爾鄉
- Hanyu Pinyin: Dábùdá'ěr Xiāng
Transcriptions
Standard Mandarin
- Hanyu Pinyin: Dábùdá'ěr Xiāng

Uyghur name
- Uyghur: دەفتەر يېزىسى
Transcriptions
- Latin Yëziqi: Defter Yëzisi
- Yengi Yeziⱪ: Dəftər Yezisi
- Siril Yëziqi: Дәфтәр Йезиси

Sarikoli name
- Sarikoli: ذەۋذار دىيۇر [ðavðɔr diyur]

Dafdar, (Note: Chinese: 达布达尔; pinyin: Dábùdá'ěr; Uyghur: دەفتەر يېزىسى, romanized: Defter Yëzisi; Sarikoli: ذەۋذار دىيۇر, romanized: Δavẟor Diyur, [ðavˈðɔr diˈjur]; Wakhi: دَڤدار دیار, romanized: Davdor Diyor, [davˈdɔr diˈjɔr]) also spelled Daftar, is a township in the Taghdumbash Pamir located in Tashkurgan Tajik Autonomous County, Kashgar Prefecture, Xinjiang Uyghur Autonomous Region, China. The township is located near the China–Pakistan border. The southern part of the township is located in the Trans-Karakoram Tract claimed by India.

== Name ==
Dafdar means "door" or "gateway" in the Sarikoli language, spoken by Chinese Tajiks.

== History ==
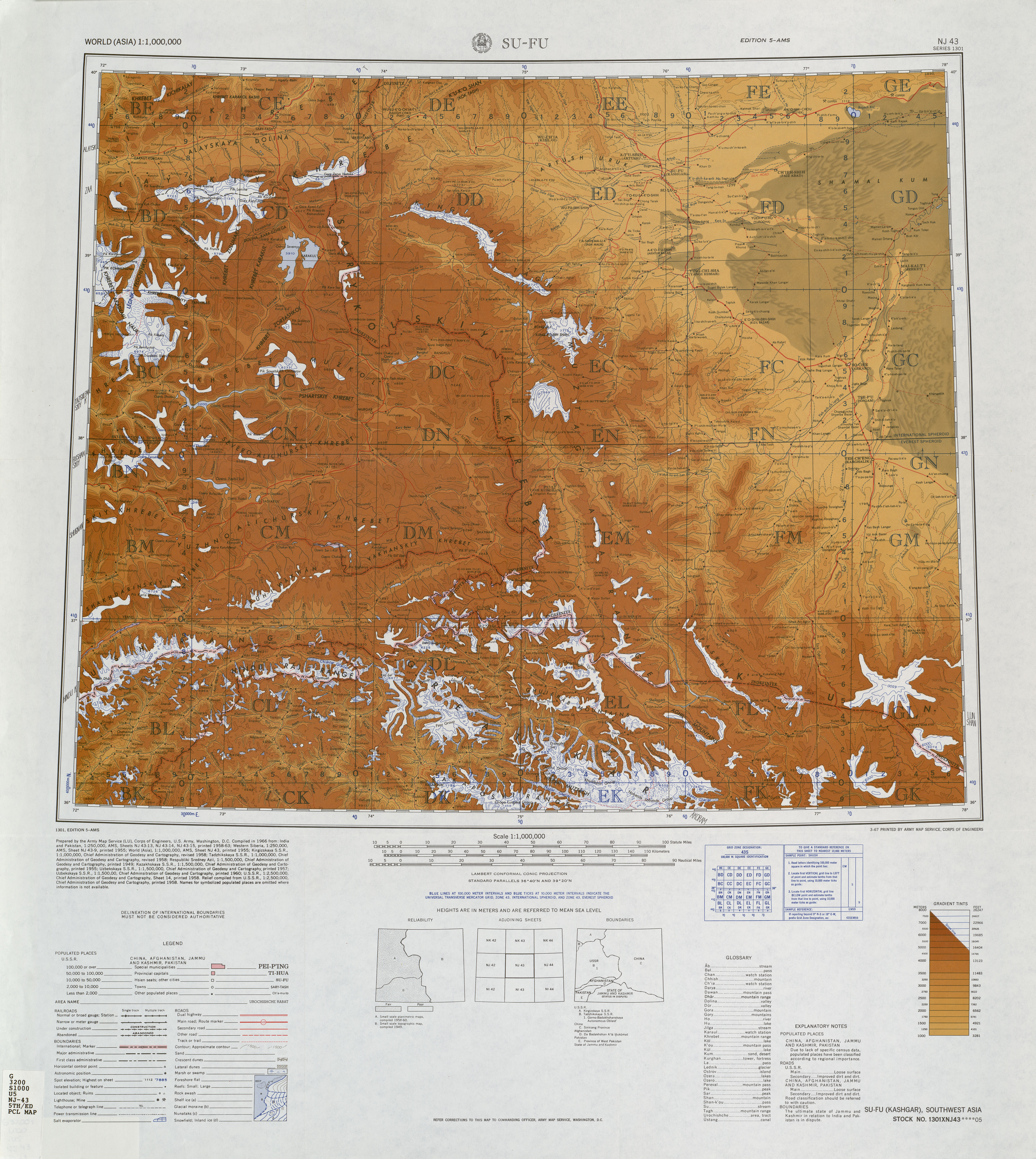
Map of the region including Dafdar (labeled as Ta-fu-tai-erh) (AMS, 1966)

The area has been used for grazing by various pastoral people in the region for centuries.

During the Qing dynasty, the Chinese claimed suzerainty over the area but permitted the Mir of Hunza to administer the region in return for a tribute. According to British colonial sources, this arrangement started during early Ayosh dynasty of Mir of Hunza, as the Mir conquered the Kirghiz nomads of Taghdumbash Pamir. The Mir erected a cairn in the village to evidence his control. The tribute system continued up until 1937.

In 1875, British explorers recorded that Dafdar did not have a permanent settlement, but that it was used a caravan camp on the route between Tashkurgan and Hunza Valley. In the early 1900s, a group of Wakhi settled here with the consent of the Chinese authority.

In March 1950, Dafdar Township was established.

In 1959, Dafdar Township became a commune.

In 1966, Dafdar Commune was renamed Xianfeng Commune ('pioneer commune', 先锋公社).

In 1975 in the closing days of the Cultural Revolution, the original name was restored.

In February 1985, Dafdar Commune was made a township.

Emerald deposits were discovered in Dafdar in 2003. These emeralds show similar chemical fingerprints to Afghan emeralds from the Panjshir Valley.

== Geography ==
K2, the second highest mountain on Earth, is located in the Trans-Karakoram Tract on the China-Pakistan border in Dafdar.

Dafdar village lies at an altitude of 3,400 m above sea level, just to the east of the Karakoram Highway.

== Administrative divisions ==
As of 2019, the township included five villages (Mandarin Chinese pinyin-derived names):

- Dafdar (达布达尔村)(دەفتەر كەنتى)
- Bayik (Atejiayili 阿特加依里村)(ئاتجەيلى كەنتى)
- Raskam (Resikamu 热斯喀木村 / 热斯卡木村)(راسكام كەنتى)
- Bosit Dokit (波斯特多克特村)(بوسىت دوكىت كەنتى)
- Khunjerab (红其拉甫村)(قونجىراپ كەنتى)

== Demographics ==
Historical population
Year	Pop.	±% p.a.
2000	3,123	—
2010	2,718	−1.38%

In 1997, 89.6% of the population of the township was Chinese Tajik and 10.3% of the population was Kyrgyz.

It is inhabited by Wakhis.

As of the 2000s, there was one mosque in the township and twelve religious professionals.

== Transportation ==
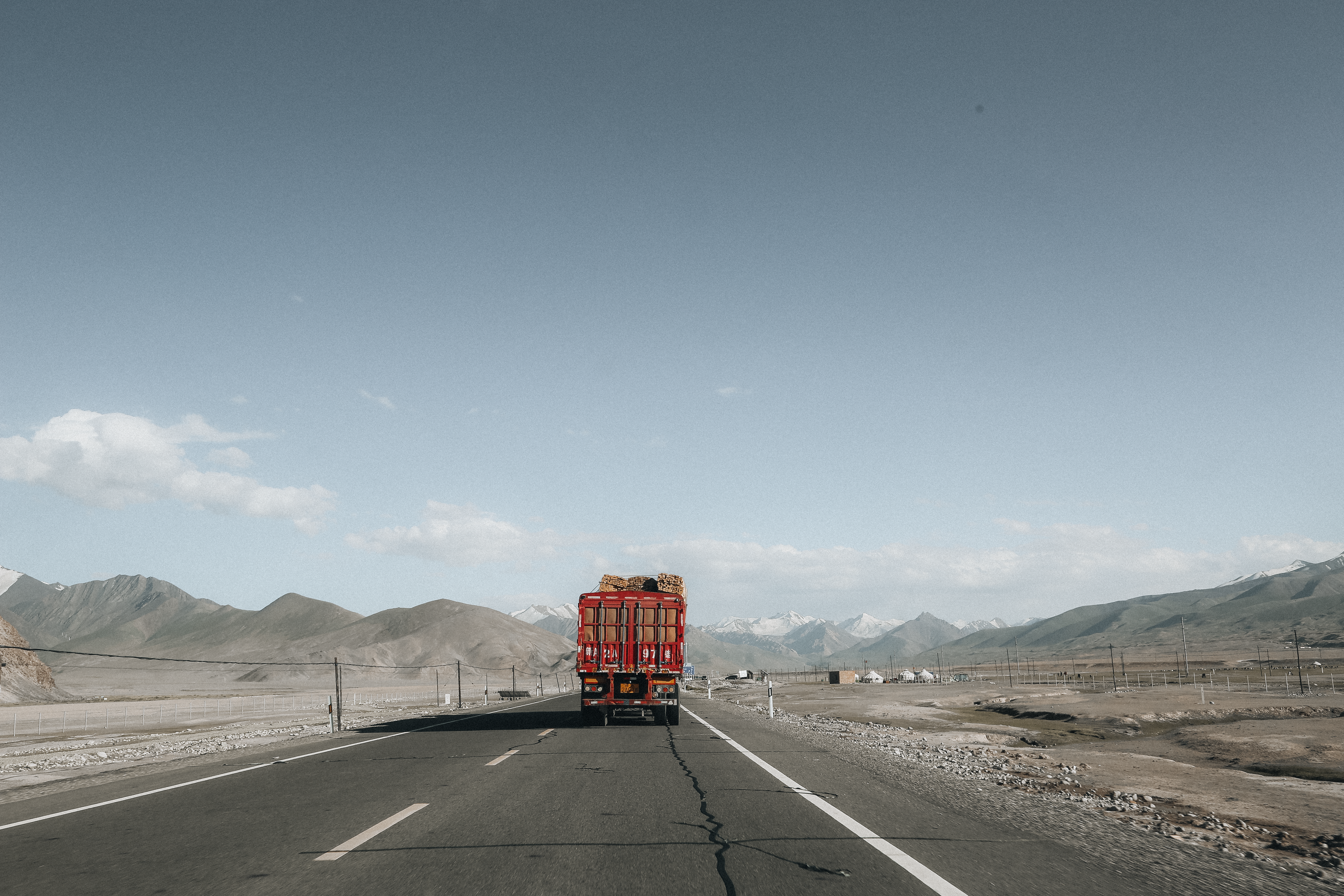
China National Highway 314, passed Dafdar, towards the border with Pakistan.

- China National Highway 314

== See also ==
- Shaksgam River
- Chalachigu Valley
- Trans-Karakoram Tract
- Yinsugaiti Glacier
- Sarpo Laggo Glacier
- List of township-level divisions of Xinjiang
