= Shaksgam River =

River in China and Pakistan

Sakshagam River 沙克思干河 शक्सगाम नदी دریائے شکسگام
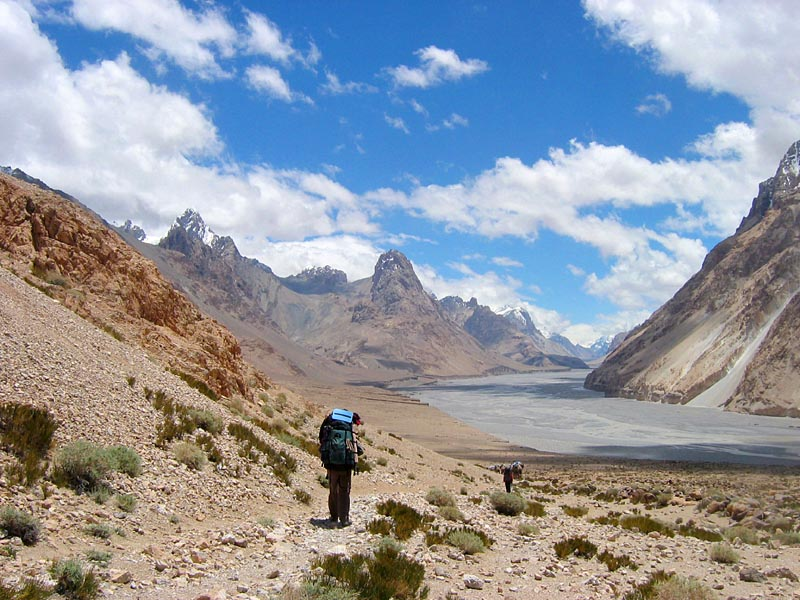

- The junction of the Shaksam River with the Yarkand River Shaksgam River (Gilgit Baltistan)

Location
- Country: China (disputed by India )
- Province: Xinjiang

Physical characteristics
- Source: Karakoram range
  - location: Gasherbrum Glaciers
  - coordinates: 35.6084°N 77.33°E
  - elevation: 5,350 metres (17,550 ft)
- Mouth: Yarkand River
  - coordinates: 36°37′27″N 76°12′17″E
  - elevation: 2,960 metres (9,710 ft)

Basin features
- Progression: Yarkand→ Tarim→ Taitema Lake
- Tributaries
  - left: Shimshal Braldu River, Oprang River

The Shaksgam River is a left tributary of the Yarkand River. The river is also known as the Kelechin River (Chinese: 克勒青河) and Muztagh River (Chinese: 穆斯塔格河). It rises in the Gasherbrum, Urdok, Staghar, Singhi and Kyagar glaciers in the Karakoram. It then flows in a general northwestern direction parallel to the Karakoram ridge line in the Shaksgam Valley. It receives the waters of the Shimshal Braldu River and the Oprang River from the Pakistan-administered Hunza District before turning east and joining the Yarkand River. The stretch of the river's course between Shimshal Braldu and Oprang is used as the Pakistan–China border.

Administratively, the Chinese part of the valley is within the southernmost portions of Yarkand County (the source) and the Tashkurgan Tajik Autonomous County (lower course). India claims the entire valley as part of its Jammu and Kashmir state, now part of Ladakh.

== History ==
The river valley was explored in 1889 by Francis Younghusband (who referred to the Shaksgam as the Oprang), and again in 1926 by Kenneth Mason, who confirmed the sources of the river. According to Ardito Desio, the name is derived from two Balti words shak (lit. 'sandy') and gam (lit. 'dry'). According to Mason, it means "box of gravel" or "dry gravel".

== Geography ==
The upper river valley is used by climbers approaching the north face of K2. The approach requires a crossing of the river, which is hazardous. Between its confluence with the Shimshal Braldu River and its confluence with the Oprang River, the Shaksgam River forms the border between China and Pakistan. The area is used as winter pastures by yak herdsmen from the village of Shimshal. Historically, the bed of the Yarkand River where the Shaksgam joins it was used for cultivation by farmers from the state of Hunza. The rulers of Hunza are said to have obtained these "territorial rights to Shaksgam" in the distant past.

It is not rare for the average annual temperature in the region to fall below freezing during the winter months.

== See also ==
- Trans-Karakoram Tract
- Dafdar
- Yinsugaiti Glacier
- Sarpo Laggo Glacier
