= Tegermansu Pass =

Mountain pass between China and Afghanistan

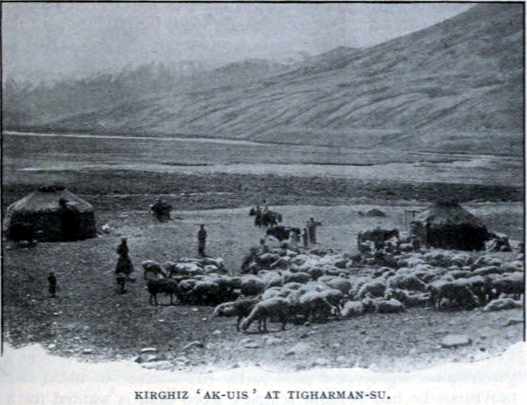
- Kyrgyz camp near Tegermansu Pass as captured by Aurel Stein

- Location within Southern Xinjiang
- Interactive map of Tegermansu Pass
- Elevation: 4,827 metres (15,837 ft)

Third Approach
- Location: Wakhan, Badakhshan, Afghanistan - Taxkorgan, Kashgar, Xinjiang, China
- Range: Pamir Mountains
- Coordinates: 37.2844°N 74.7336°E

Tegermansu Pass

Chinese name
- Traditional Chinese: 托克滿蘇達坂
- Simplified Chinese: 托克满苏达板
Transcriptions
Standard Mandarin
- Hanyu Pinyin: Tuōkèmǎnsū shānkǒu

Tok Man Su Daban
- Traditional Chinese: 托克滿素達坂
- Simplified Chinese: 托克满素达坂
Transcriptions
Standard Mandarin
- Hanyu Pinyin: Tuōkèmǎnsù dábǎn

Tigarman Su Pass
- Traditional Chinese: 鐵蓋滿蘇山口
- Simplified Chinese: 铁盖满苏山口
Transcriptions
Standard Mandarin
- Hanyu Pinyin: Tiěgàimǎnsū shānkǒu

Uyghur name
- Uyghur: تەگىرمەنسۇ داۋانى

Persian name
- Persian: دهلیز تگیرمان‌سو

Tegermansu Pass or Tigarman Su Pass (Kotal-e Tegermansu, Chinese: 托克满苏山口) is a closed mountain pass on the border between Afghanistan and China in Wakhan Corridor, in the Hindu Kush — Pamir mountain range. It is located between the Tegermansu Valley on the eastern end of the Little Pamir and Chalachigu Valley in Xinjiang, China. Historically, it was one of the three routes between China and Wakhan.

On Chinese side, there is a Chinese border post in the valley below. There have been proposals and plans by Kashgar regional government to open this pass as a port of entry for economic purposes since the 1990s. However, this has yet to happen.

Tegerman Su is the name of the river valley on the Afghan side, easternmost part of Afghanistan. During the late 2000s, due to lawlessness, the Kirghiz in Afghanistan reported robbery and theft in Little Pamir by bandits from Tajikistan.

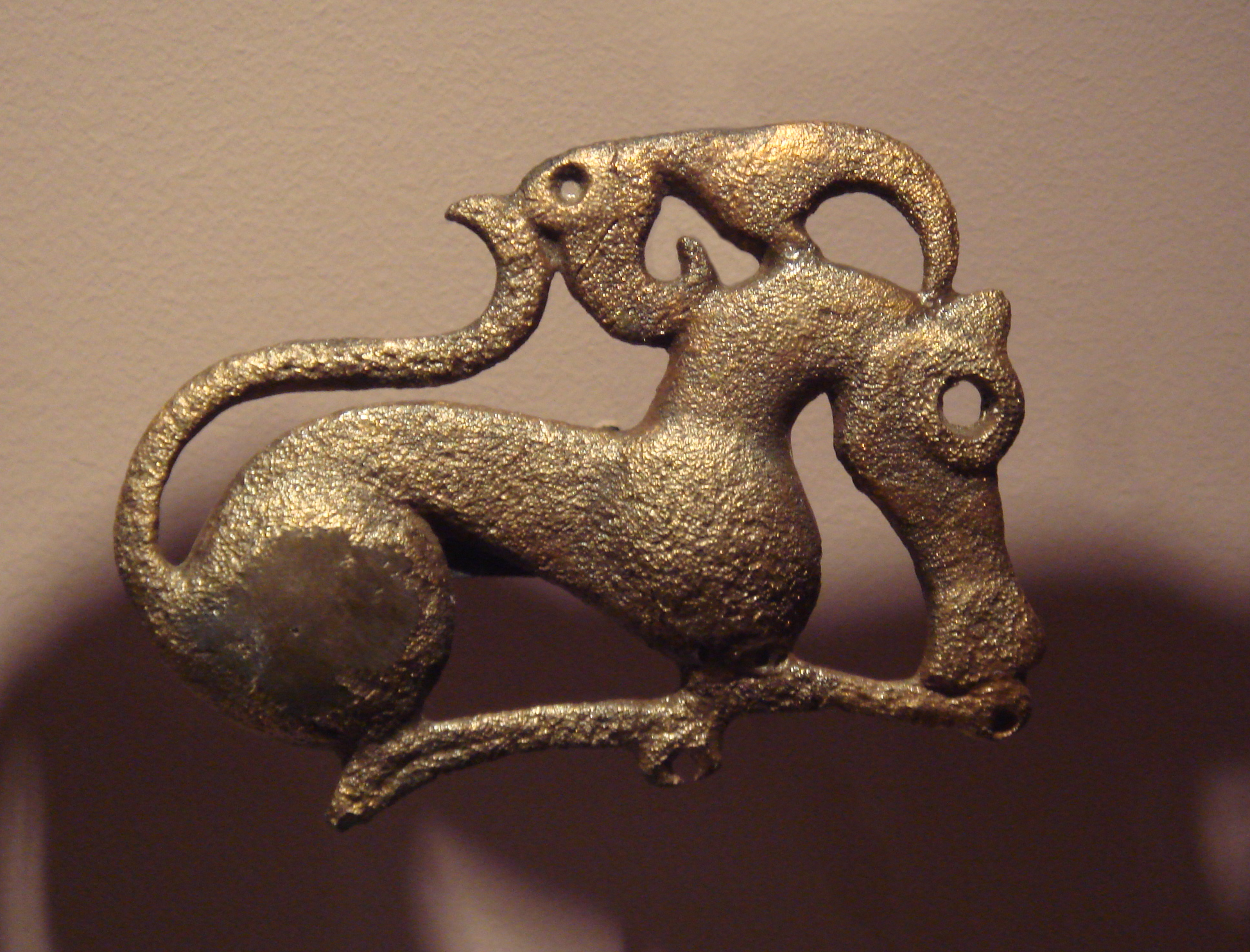
Stylized horse and bird, Tomb of Tegermansu I, Eastern Pamirs, Tajikistan, 4th century BCE

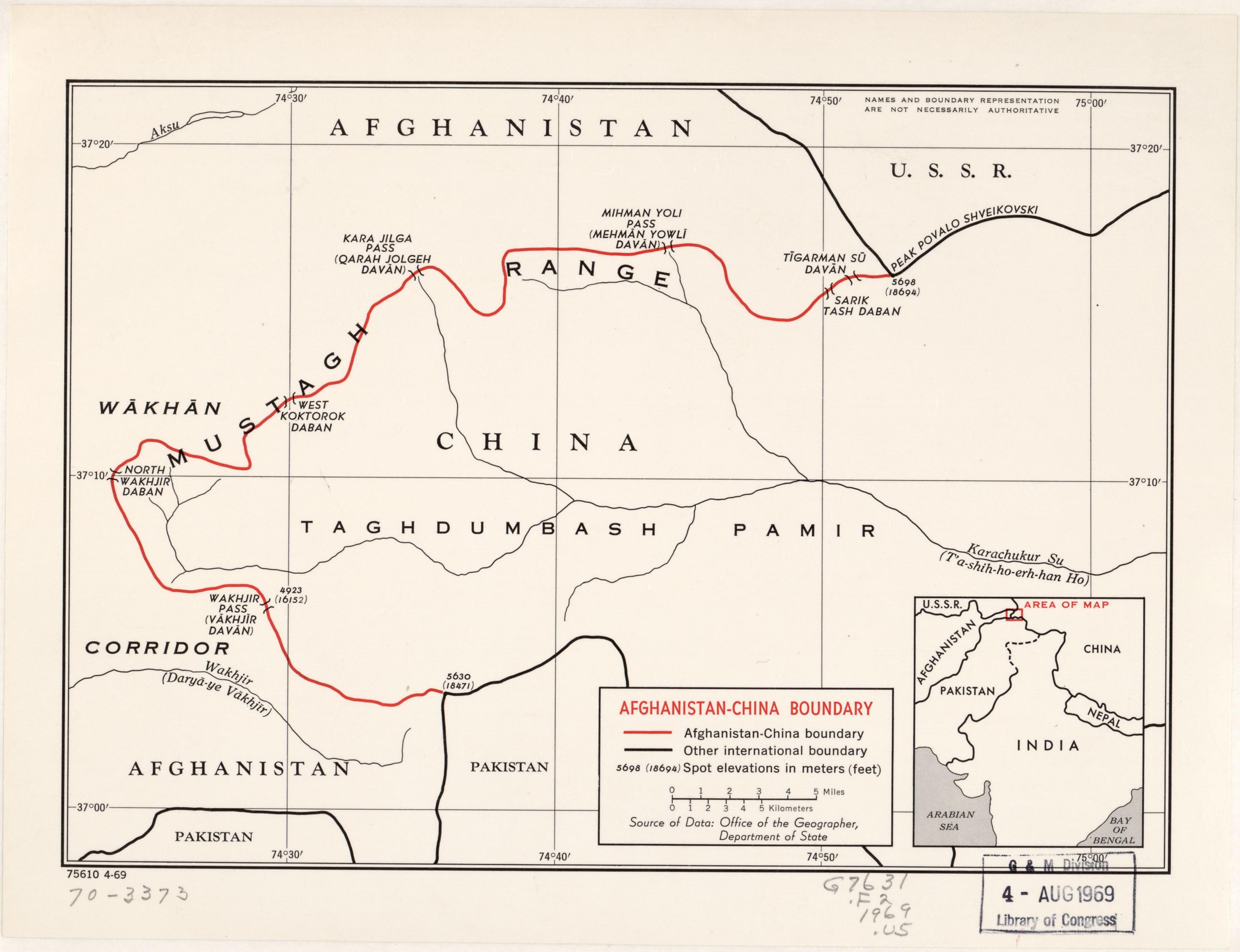
Map of Afghanistan-China Boundary including Tegermansu Pass (labeled as TĪGARMAN SŪ DAVĀN) (1969) (Note: From map: "NAMES AND BOUNDARY REPRESENTATION ARE NOT NECESSARILY AUTHORITATIVE")

== See also ==
- Afghanistan-China border
- Wakhjir Pass
- Beyik Pass
- Kilik Pass
- Mintaka Pass
- China–Tajikistan border
- China–Pakistan border
