= Yinsugaiti Glacier =

Glacier in Xinjiang, China

- 音苏盖提冰川 (Chinese)
- Location within Southern Xinjiang
- Interactive map of Yinsugaiti Glacier
- Type: Mountain glacier
- Location: Karakoram range, Xinjiang, China
- Coordinates: 35°55′43″N 76°29′34″E
- Area: 392.4 square kilometres (151.5 sq mi)
- Length: 41.5 km (25.8 mi)

The Yinsugaiti Glacier is located in Shaksgam River basin, north-west of K2 peak on the northern slope of the Karakoram Range. The glacier is about 41.5 kilometres long, covering an area of 392.4 square kilometres. It is China's largest glacier valley.

== See also ==
- Sarpo Laggo Glacier
- Trans-Karakoram Tract
- Dafdar
- Shaksgam River
