= Sarpo Laggo Glacier =

Glacier in Xinjiang, China

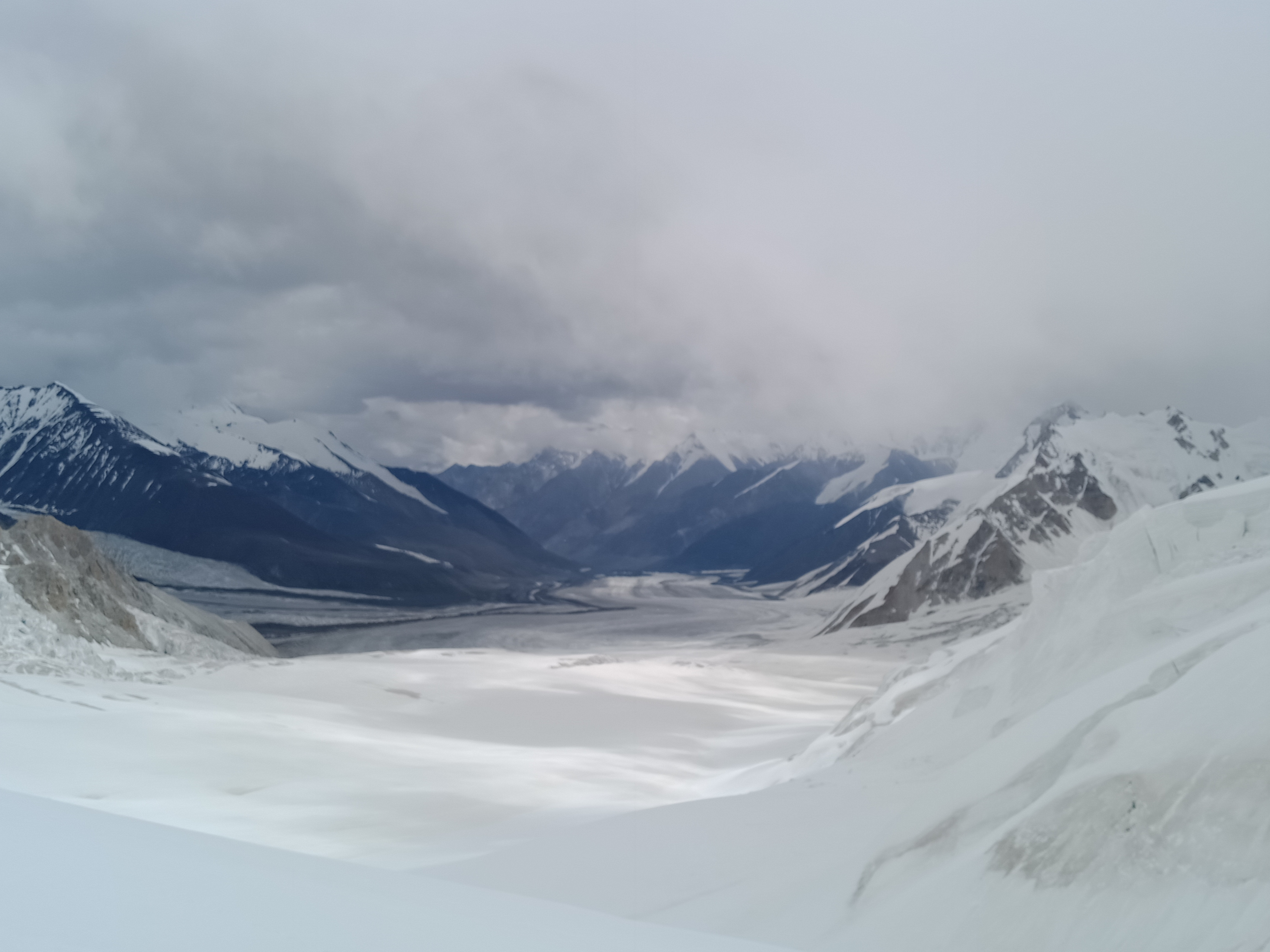
- Sarpo Laggo Glacier, is a glacier in the autonomous region Xinjiang of China. On the border of Pakistan - China Boundary

- Location within Karakoram Location within Gilgit Baltistan Location within Southern Xinjiang
- Interactive map of Sarpo Laggo Glacier
- Type: Mountain glacier
- Location: Karakoram range, Gilgit-Baltistan, Pakistan
- Coordinates: 35°53′N 76°15′E

The Sarpo Laggo Glacier (Chinese: 萨尔波拉戈冰川, Sarpo Laggo: 'young husband') is a glacier in the autonomous region Xinjiang of China, in the Karakoram mountain range of the Himalayas.

== Geography ==
Sarpo Laggo Glacier lies north of the Baltoro Muztagh range, reachable from the Baltoro glacier on the Pakistani side of the Karakorams via the Old Muztagh Pass northeast of the Trango Towers. It is, however, easier to approach from the Chinese side, starting a long hike at Kashgar on the Karakoram Highway and finally passing K2's northern base camp. The glacier is named after Francis Younghusband, who was the first person to pass the Old Mustagh Pass and thus enter the Sarpo Laggo region. There is another glacier not far away, also named after him: Younghusband glacier (also known as Biango glacier) flows from Muztagh Tower towards the Baltoro Glacier.

== See also ==
- Trans-Karakoram Tract
- Dafdar
- Shaksgam River
- Yinsugaiti Glacier
- Baltoro Glacier
- Trango Glacier
- Concordia (Pakistan)
- List of highest mountains
- List of glaciers
