= China–Pakistan border =

International border

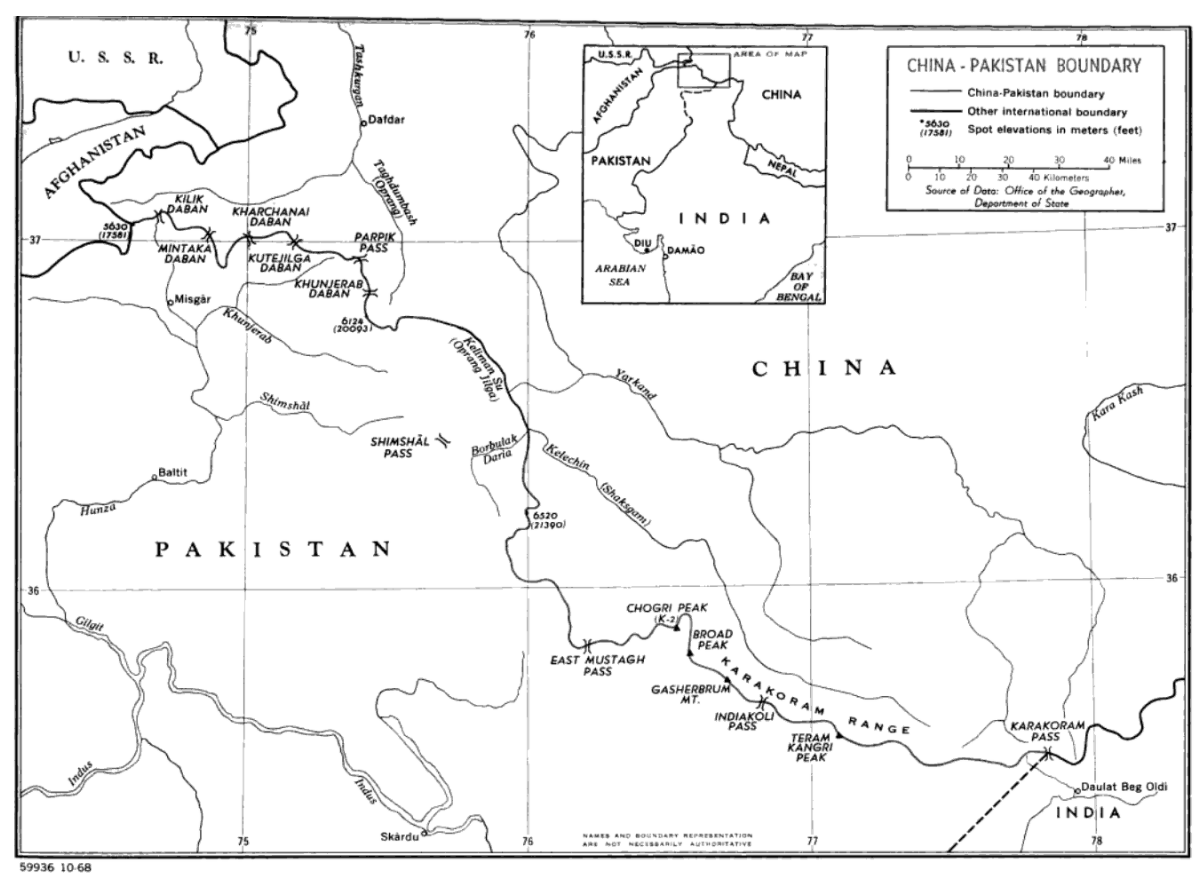
- Map of the China-Pakistan border

Characteristics
- Entities: China Pakistan
- Length: 559 kilometres (347 mi)

History
- Current shape: 15 March 1963 after ratification of the Sino-Pakistan Treaty
- Treaties: Sino-Pakistan Agreement

Chinese and Pakistani boundary markers

The China–Pakistan border is 596 kilometres (370 mi) long and runs west–east from the tripoint with Afghanistan to the disputed tripoint with India in the vicinity of the Siachen Glacier. It traverses the Karakoram Mountains, one of the world's tallest mountain ranges. Hunza District, Nagar District, Shigar District and Ghanche District in Gilgit-Baltistan administered by Pakistan, border Taxkorgan Tajik Autonomous County and Kargilik/Yecheng County in Kashgar Prefecture, Xinjiang Uygur Autonomous Region, China.

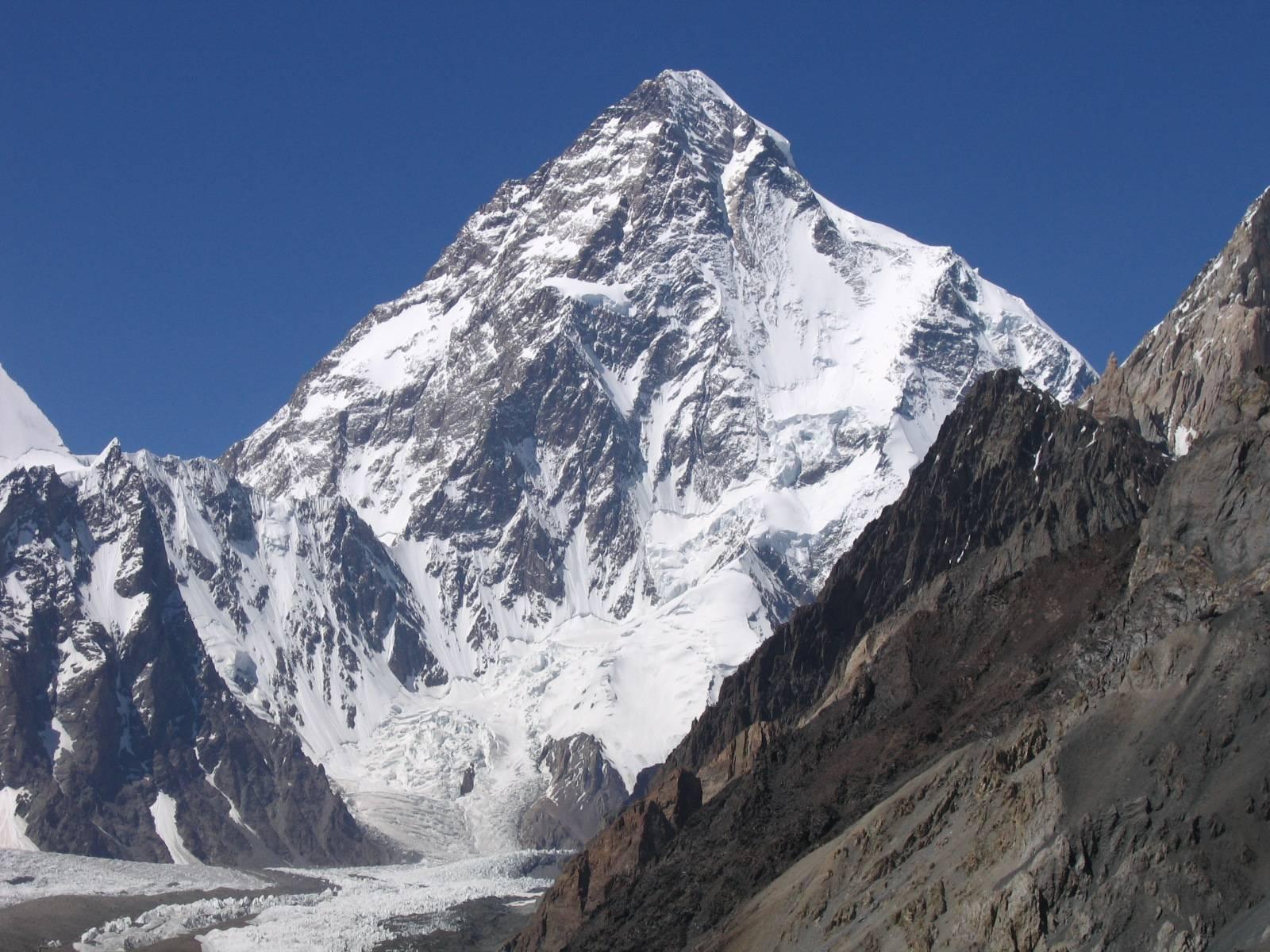
K2, the world's second-highest mountain, in Pakistan, lies on the border

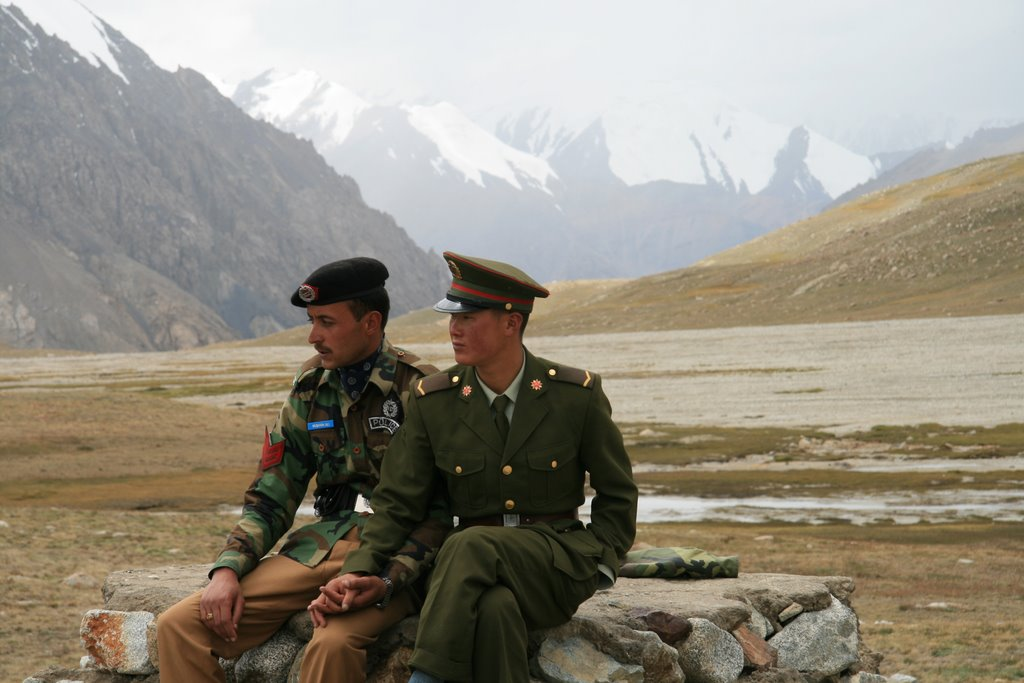
Chinese and Pakistani soldiers at Khunjerab Pass, China-Pakistan border in 2007

== History ==
The modern border dates from the period of the British Raj when Britain controlled India, which then included what is now Pakistan. In 1899, the British, via its envoy to China Sir Claude MacDonald, proposed what became known as the MacDonald Line to the Chinese government, however the Chinese never responded to the proposal and thus this border was never formalised. In 1905, Lord Curzon unilaterally modified the MacDonald Line, extending it north of Shimshal Pass.

Over the following decades a variety of maps were issued by all sides in the dispute, showing wildly varying boundaries. India and Pakistan inherited the dispute upon independence in 1947, further complicated by their dispute over ownership of Jammu and Kashmir. The issue came to the fore in the early 1960s, at a time of intense tension in the region due to ongoing failure to solve the Indo-Pakistani dispute over Kashmir, a much larger Chinese presence in Tibet, and the Sino-Indian War of 1962 in which China had seized control of the Indian-claimed Aksai Chin region. In 1961 China and Pakistan agreed in principle to demarcate their common border; negotiations commenced the following year, with the final Sino-Pakistan Agreement being signed in 1963. Both sides made concessions in the treaty, with Pakistan giving up claims on area north of watershed of Karakoram, now known as the Trans-Karakoram Tract, while China gave up claims on Hunza along with ceding a small tract comprising some 52 km^{2} (20 sq mi) of area around Shimshal Valley to Pakistan. The resulting border essentially followed the 1905 border along the main watershed of Karakoram. Following the treaty a series of maps and aerial surveys of the border area were made and boundary pillars installed.

== Description ==
The 1963 Sino-Pakistani agreement delimited the boundary as follows:

"Article Two ... (1) Commencing from its northwestern extremity at height 5,630 metres (a peak, the reference co-ordinates of which are approximately Longitude 74° 34' E and Latitude 37° 03' N), the boundary line runs generally eastward and then southeastward strictly along the main watershed between the tributaries of the Tashkurgan River of the Tarim River system on the one hand and the tributaries of the Hunza River of the Indus River system on the other hand, passing through the Kilik Daban (Dawan), the Mintaka Daban (Pass), the Kharchanai Daban (named on the Chinese map only), the Kutejilga Daban (named on the Chinese map only), and the Parpik Pass (named on the Pakistan map only), and reaches the Khunjerab (Yutr) Daban (Pass).

(2) After passing through the Khunjerab (Yutr) Daban (Pass), the boundary line runs generally southward along the above-mentioned main watershed up to a mountaintop south of the Daban (Pass), where it leaves the main watershed to follow the crest of a spur lying generally in a south-easterly direction, which is the watershed between the Akjilga River (a nameless corresponding river on the Pakistan map) on the one hand, and the Taghdumbash (Oprang River) and the Keliman Su (Oprang Jilga) on the other hand. According to the map of the Chinese side, the boundary line, after leaving the southeastern extremity of this spur, runs along a small section of the middle line of the bed of the Keliman Su to reach its confluence with the Kelechin River. According to the map of the Pakistan side, the boundary line, after leaving the southeastern extremity of this spur, reaches the sharp bend of the Shaksgam or Mustagh River.

(3) From the aforesaid point, the boundary line runs up the Kelechin River (Shaksgam or Muztagh River) along the middle line of its bed to its confluence (reference co-ordinates approximately Longitude 76° 02' E. and Latitude 36° 26' N.) with the Sorbulak Daria (Shimshal River or Braldu River).

(4) From the confluence of the aforesaid two rivers, the boundary line, according to the map of the Chinese side, ascends the crest of a spur and runs along it to join the Karakoram Range main watershed at a mountain-top (reference co-ordinates approximately Longitude 75° 54' E. and Latitude 36° 15' N.), which on this map is shown as belonging to the Shorbulak Mountain. According to the map of the Pakistan side, the boundary line from the confluence of the above-mentioned two rivers ascends the crest of a corresponding spur and runs along it; passing through Height 6,520 metres (21,300 feet) till it joins the Karakoram Range main watershed at a peak (reference co-ordinates approximately Longitude 75° 57' E. and Latitude 36° 03' N.).

(5) Thence, the boundary line, running generally southward and then eastward, strictly follows the Karakoram Range main watershed which separates the Tarim River drainage system from the Indus River drainage system, passing through the East Mustagh Pass (Muztagh Pass), the top of the Chogri Peak (K2), the top of the Broad Peak, the top of the Gasherbrum Mountain (8068) Indirakoli Pass (named on the Chinese map only) and the top of the Teram Kangri Peak, and reaches its southeastern extremity at the Karakoram Pass."

== Disputed status ==
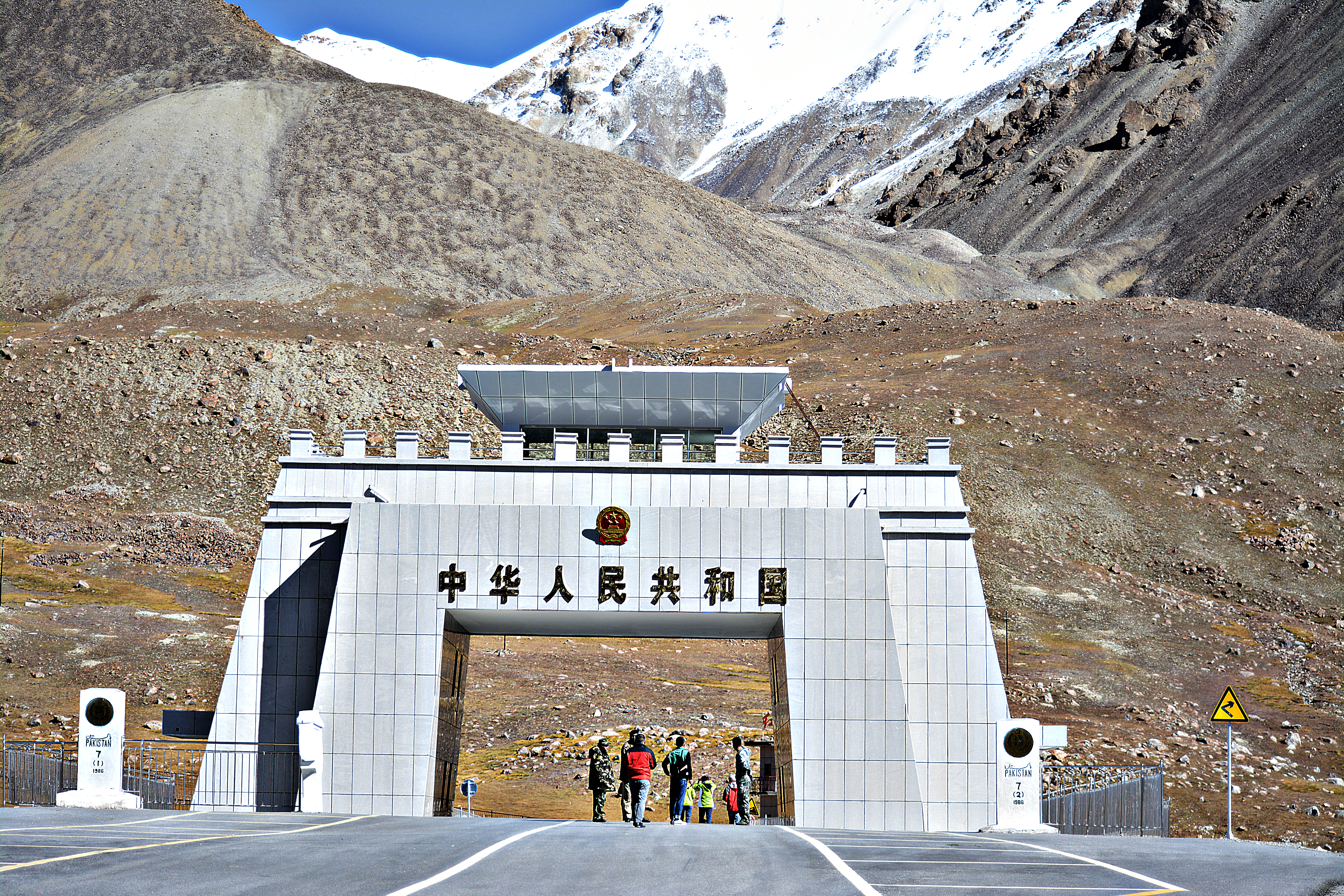
Khunjerab Pass, border crossing between China and Pakistan. The simplified Chinese characters above the gate herald the People's Republic of China.

Pakistan maintains a territorial claim on the Indian-administered region of Ladakh (formerly a part of the Jammu and Kashmir state), which shares a border with China (see also: Line of Actual Control). The political map used by the Pakistani government annotates Ladakh's boundary with China as "frontier undefined", whose status would be formalised by "the sovereign authorities concerned after the settlement of the Jammu and Kashmir dispute."

Conversely, the China–Pakistan border is not recognised by India, which claims the erstwhile state of Jammu and Kashmir in its entirety, a claim which negates any Sino-Pakistani border and indeed would give India a common border with Afghanistan. India refuses to recognise the legality of the 1963 Sino-Pakistan treaty and maintains claims over the Trans-Karakorum Tract (Shaksgam Valley), a position further complicated by the fact that large sections of the rest of the China-India boundary are also disputed. In 1984 India began moving troops to the hitherto unsettled Siachen Glacier in Kashmir, thereby altering the de facto China-India-Pakistan tripoint. Article 6 of the 1963 Sino-Pakistan treaty provides for a renegotiation of the China-Pakistan boundary if the Kashmir dispute is resolved. However, with Indian relations still hostile with Pakistan and China, it is unlikely the boundary dispute will be resolved soon.

== Border crossings ==
The Khunjerab Pass is the only modern day border crossing between China and Pakistan, accessed via the Karakorum Highway. Historically the Mintaka Pass and Kilik Pass have also been used; however those crossings do not have vehicle access and are closed. As of 2026, both Mintaka and Kilik pass are accessible by car from the China side of the border. The roads splits off from G314 near Kaladong, follows the Kalaqi ku'er river in westerly direction and then splits near Keke Tuluke to head off to each of the passes respectively. The road is paved most of the way, dirt road starts 7km from Mintaka pass and 20km from Kilik pass respectively.

== Maps ==
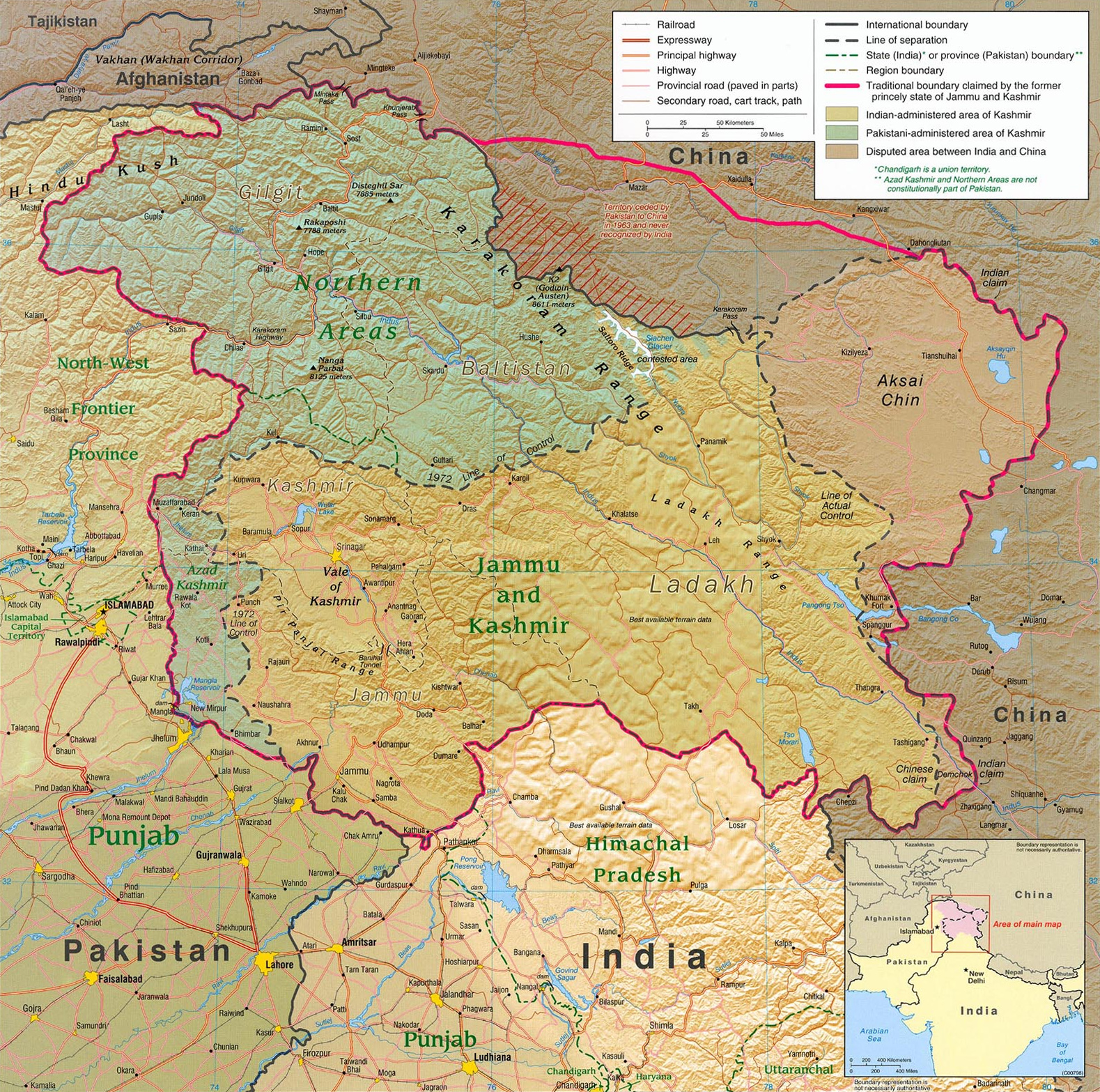
Map of the Kashmir region, showing the overlapping Chinese, Indian and Pakistani territorial claims

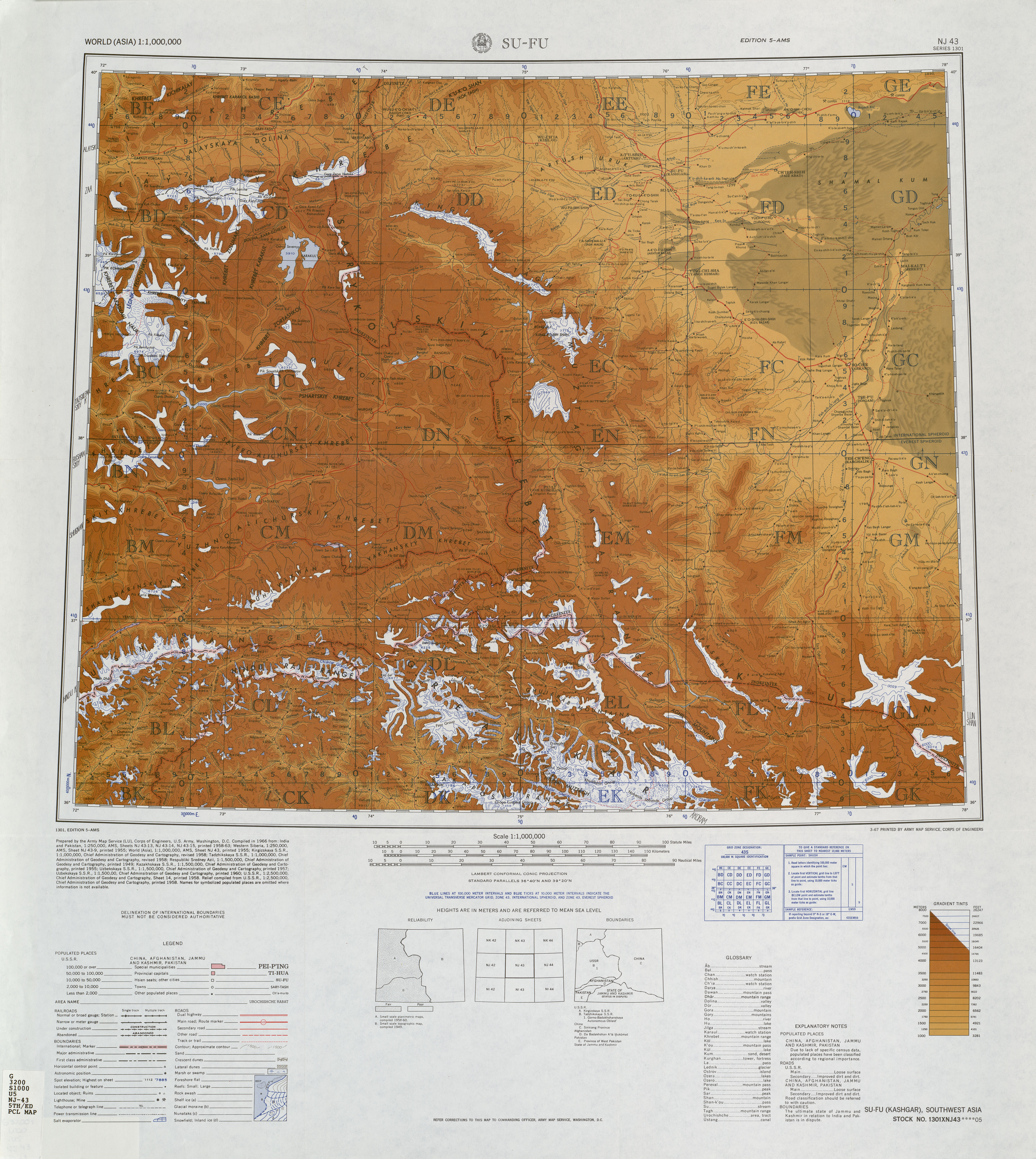
Historical map including part of the China-Kashmir (disputed between India and Pakistan) border area from the International Map of the World (1966) (Note: From map: "DELINEATION OF INTERNATIONAL BOUNDARIES MUST NOT BE CONSIDERED AUTHORITATIVE")

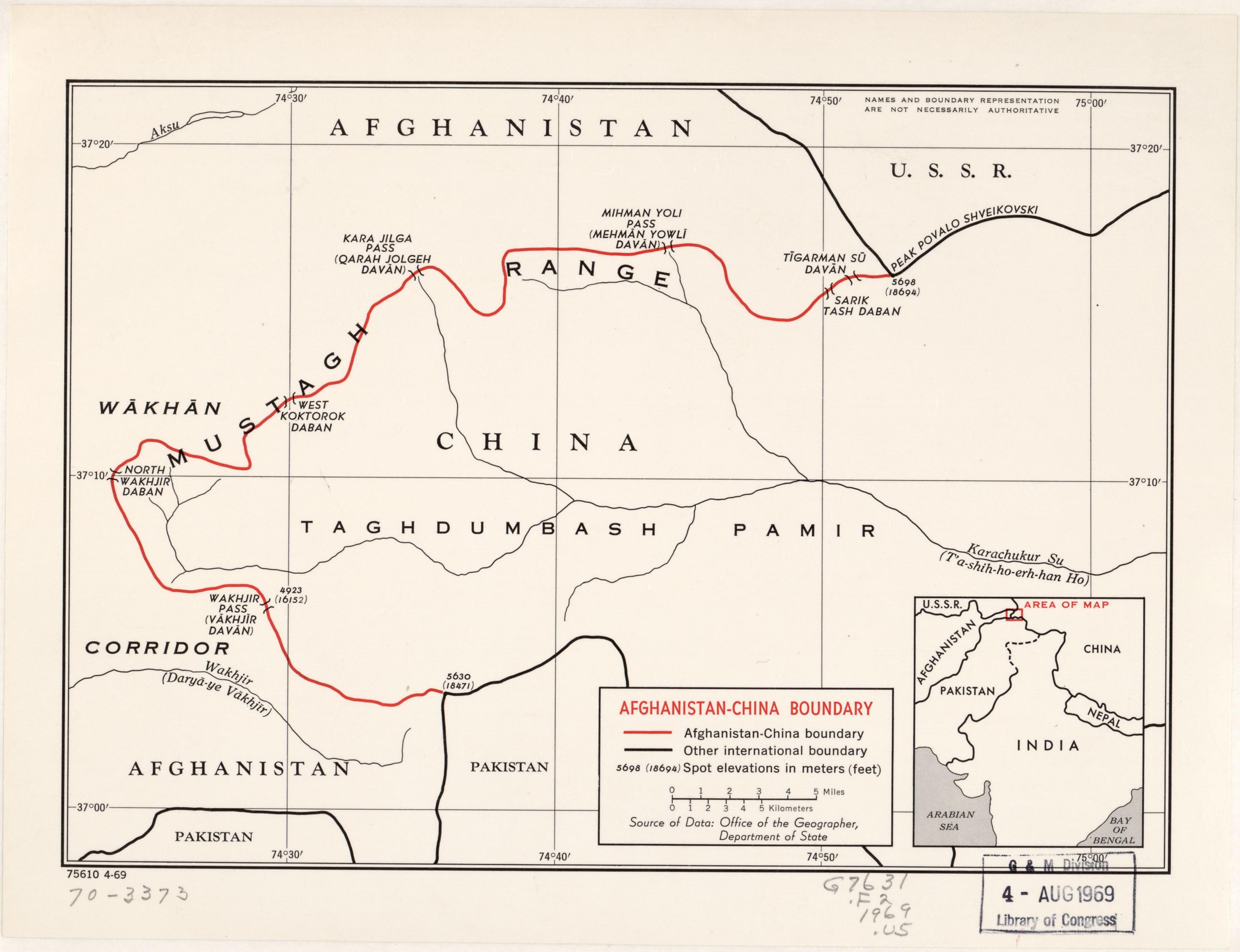
Map of Afghanistan-China Boundary (Afghanistan-China-Pakistan tripoint labeled as 5630 (18471)) (1969) (Note: From map: "NAMES AND BOUNDARY REPRESENTATION ARE NOT NECESSARILY AUTHORITATIVE")

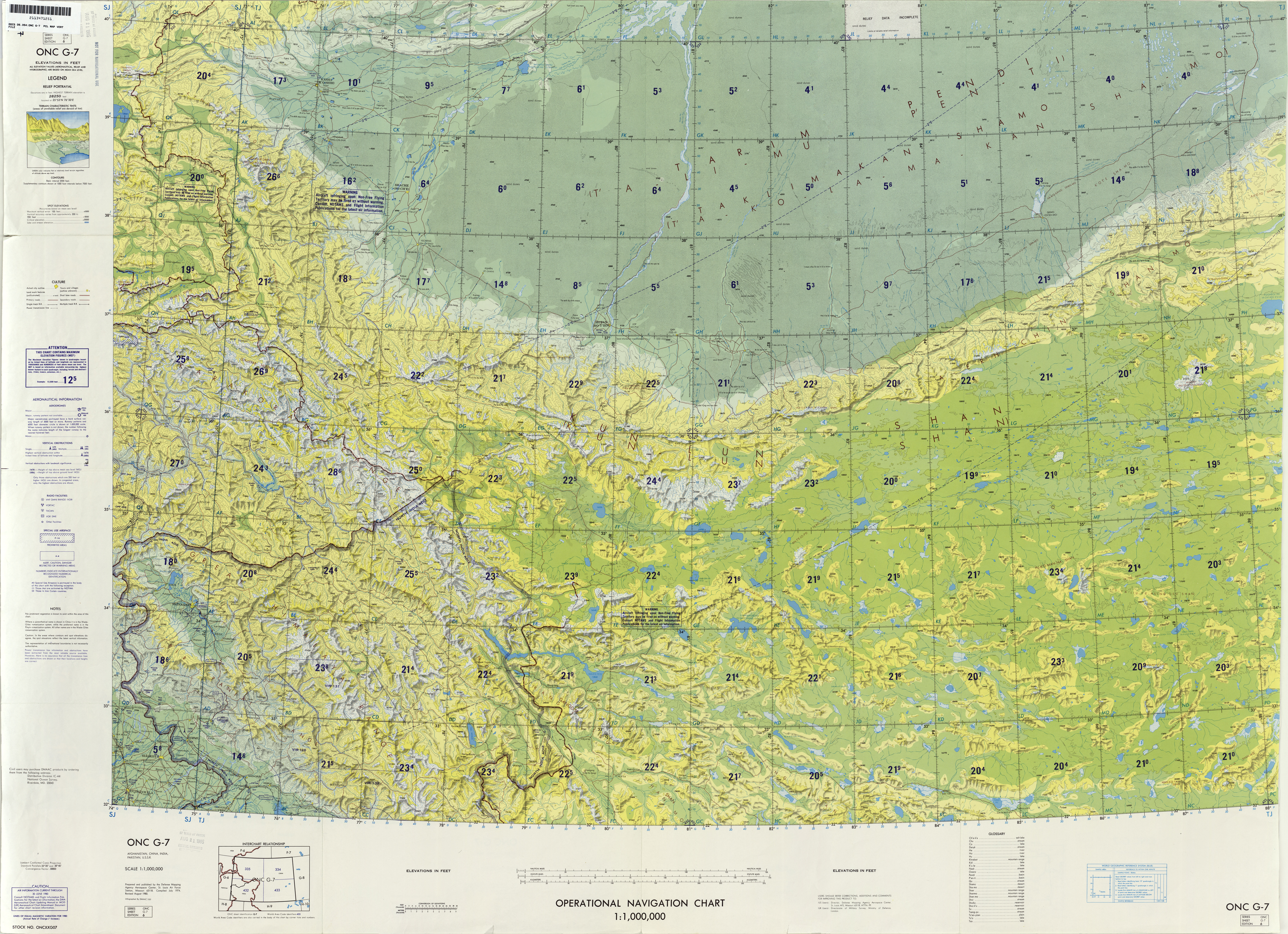
Historical map including the China-Kashmir (disputed between India and Pakistan) border area (DMA, 1980)

== See also ==
- Chalachigu Valley
- Kashmir conflict
- China–Pakistan relations
- Sino-Indian border dispute
- Kilik Pass
- Mintaka Pass
- Mustagh Pass
