= Trans-Karakoram Tract =

Chinese-administered area of Kashmir

Trans-Karakoram Tract Shaksgam Tract
- Region administered by China as a part of Xinjiang
- Location of the Trans-Karakoram Tract within the Southern Xinjiang region is disputed by India
- Coordinates: 36°01′33″N 76°38′46″E
- Administering state: China
- Autonomous Region: Xinjiang
- Prefecture: Kashgar
- County: Taxkorgan and Kargilik

Area
  - Total: 5,180 km^{2} (2,000 sq mi)

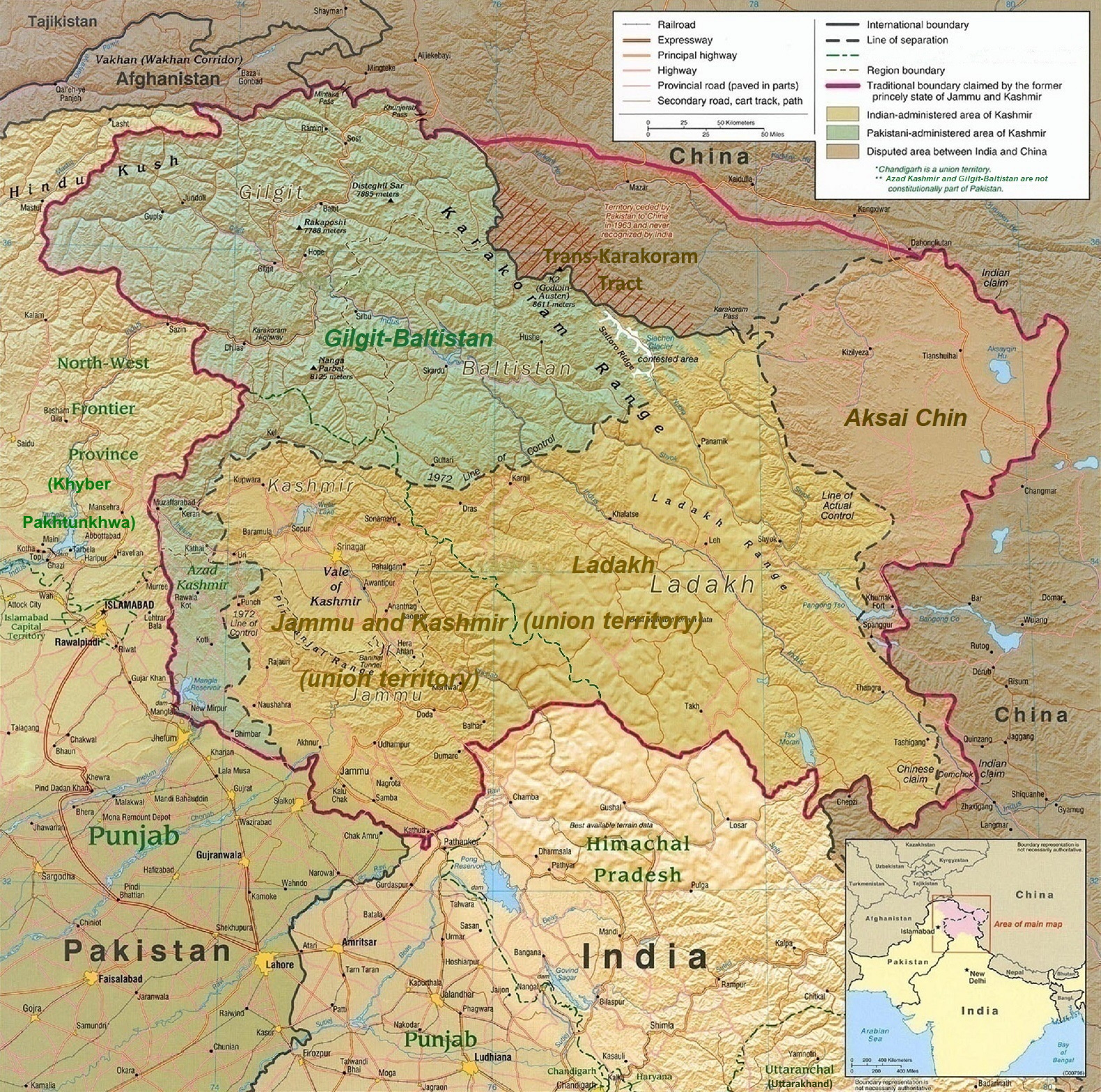
Central Intelligence Agency map of the former British Indian princely state of Jammu and Kashmir with present-day borders, showing the Trans-Karakoram Tract in the northern part of the state (hatched red) (Note: Siachen Glacier is under Indian administration despite being labelled "contested territory" in the map.)

The Trans-Karakoram Tract (Chinese: 喀喇昆仑走廊; pinyin: Kālǎkūnlún zǒuláng), also known as the Shaksgam Tract (Urdu: شکسگام, romanized: Shaksgām), is an area of approximately 5,200 km^{2} (2,000 sq mi) north of the Karakoram watershed, including the Shaksgam Valley. The tract is administered by China as part of its Taxkorgan and Yecheng counties in the Xinjiang Uyghur Autonomous Region.

Following the accession of Jammu and Kashmir to India in 1947, India claimed sovereignty over all its territory. In the 1950 border definition, India retracted the northern border south of the Yarkand River, but included the Shaksgam Valley within Jammu and Kashmir. However, the adjoining Gilgit-Baltistan region came under Pakistani control through the First Kashmir War. Pakistan and China signed Sino-Pakistan Agreement in 1963 and a border based on 1899 Macartney–MacDonald Line was recognized as the international border by China and Pakistan. India has never accepted the Sino-Pakistan Agreement, asserting that Islamabad "unlawfully" attempted to cede the area to Beijing.

According to local traditions, a polo ground in Shaksgam was built by the Amacha rulers of Shigar, and the Rajas of Shigar used to invite the Amirs of Hotan to play polo there.

The tract is one of the most inhospitable areas of the world, with some of the highest mountains of the Karakoram Range, including Broad Peak, K2 and Gasherbrum. On the southeast, it is adjacent to the highest battlefield in the world on the Siachen Glacier region which is controlled by India.

== History ==
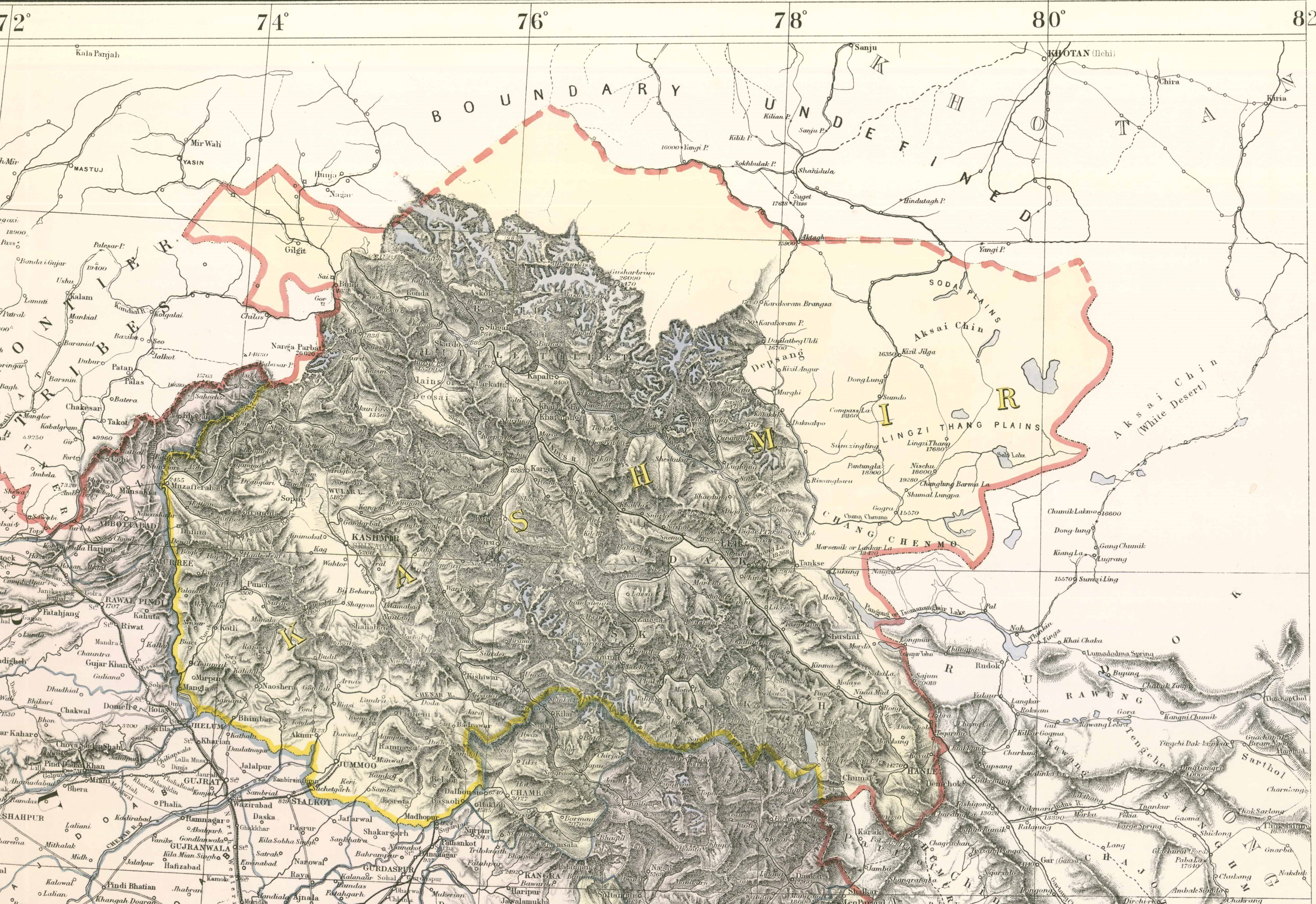
Boundary of Kashmir in the 1888 Survey of India map of India. The undefined boundary shown in dash line from Malubiting, Raskam, Aktagh to Karakunlun Shan 35.28312°N 80.261863°E

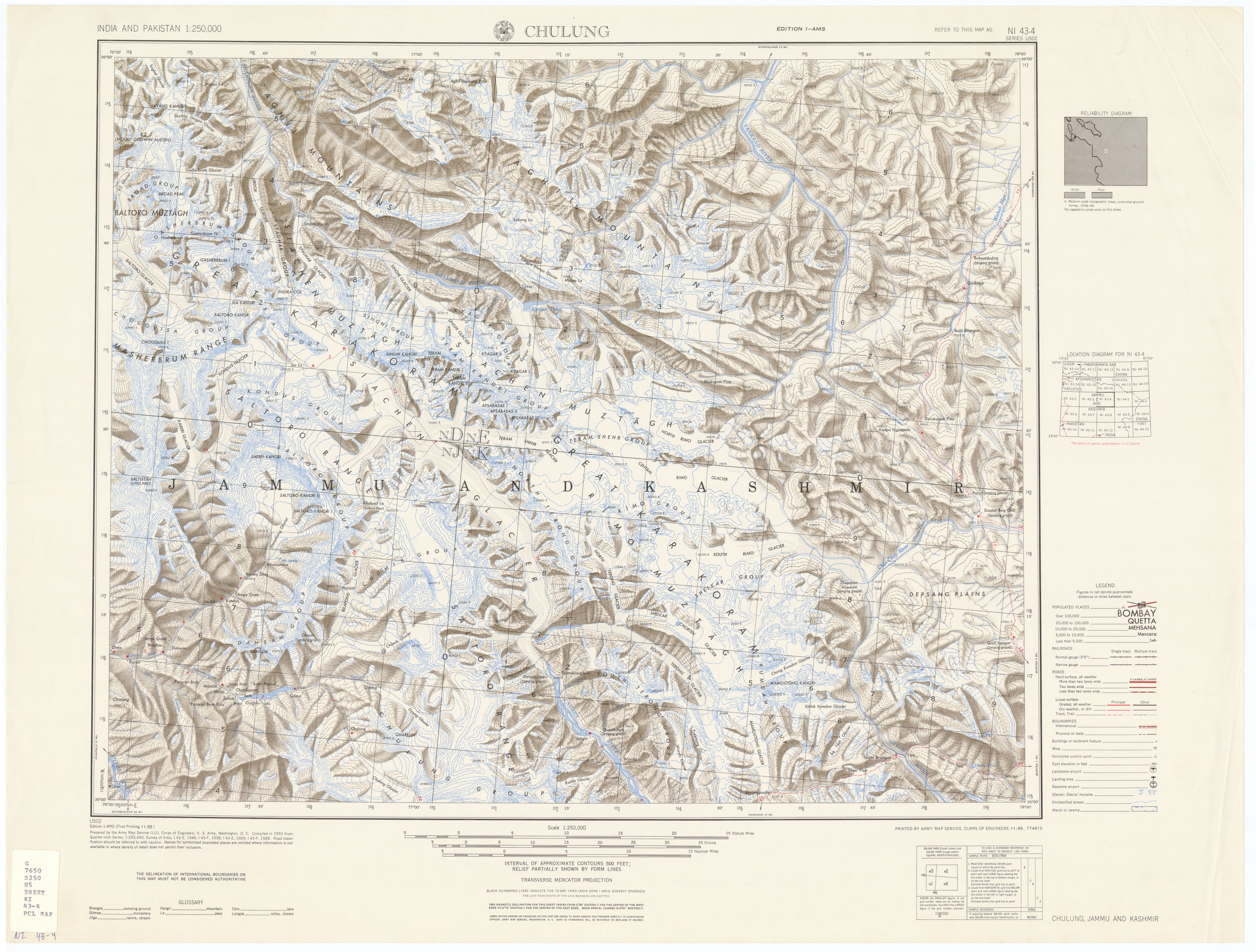
Detailed map showing part of the Trans-Karakoram Tract near the Shaksgam River (United States Army Map Service, 1953)

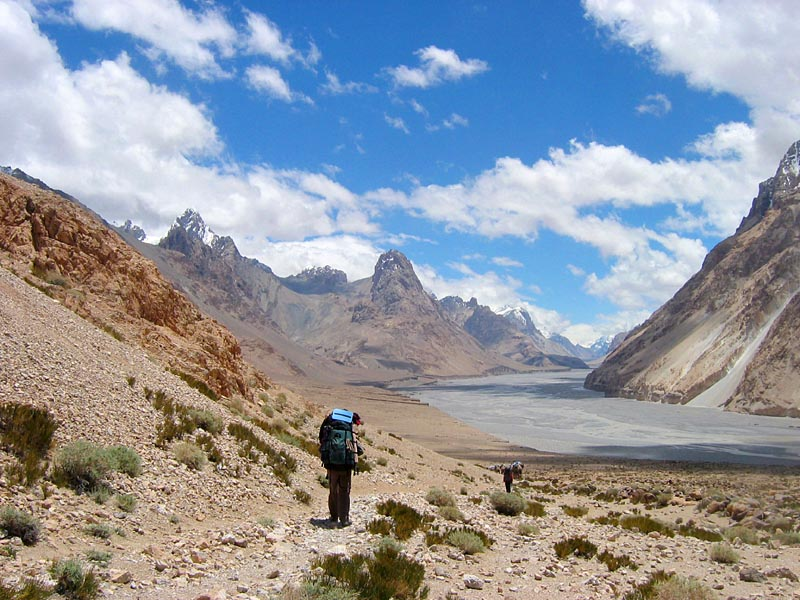
The Shaksgam Valley (Xinjiang Uyghur Autonomous Region) photographed in August 2008

Historically the people of Hunza cultivated and grazed areas to the north of the Karakoram, and the Mir of Hunza claimed those areas as part of Hunza's territories. Those areas included the Raskam Valley, north of the Shaksgam Valley.

In 1889 the first expedition to the Shaksgam Valley by a European was undertaken by Francis Younghusband (who referred to the Shaksgam as the Oprang).

At the same time, in view of "The Great Game", Britain was concerned at the danger of Russian expansion as Qing dynasty China weakened and so adopted a policy of claiming a border north of the Shaksgam River. This followed a line proposed by Sir John Ardagh in a Memorandum of 1897. That border included the Mir of Hunza's claim over the Raskam Valley. However, British administration never extended north of the Karakoram watershed.

In March 1899 the British proposed, in a formal Note from Sir Claude MacDonald to China, a new boundary between China and British India. The Note proposed that China should relinquish its claims to suzerainty over Hunza, and in return Hunza should relinquish its claims to most of the Taghdumbash and Raskam districts. It further outlined a border broadly following the main Karakoram crest, dividing the watersheds of the Indus and Tarim rivers, with a deviation to pass through a Hunza post at Darwaza near the Shimshal Pass. The Chinese did not respond to the Note and the Indian government never revisited the boundary in the same form again. The MacDonald Line was modified in 1905 to include in India a small area east of the Shimshal Pass, to put the border on a stretch of the Shaksgam River.

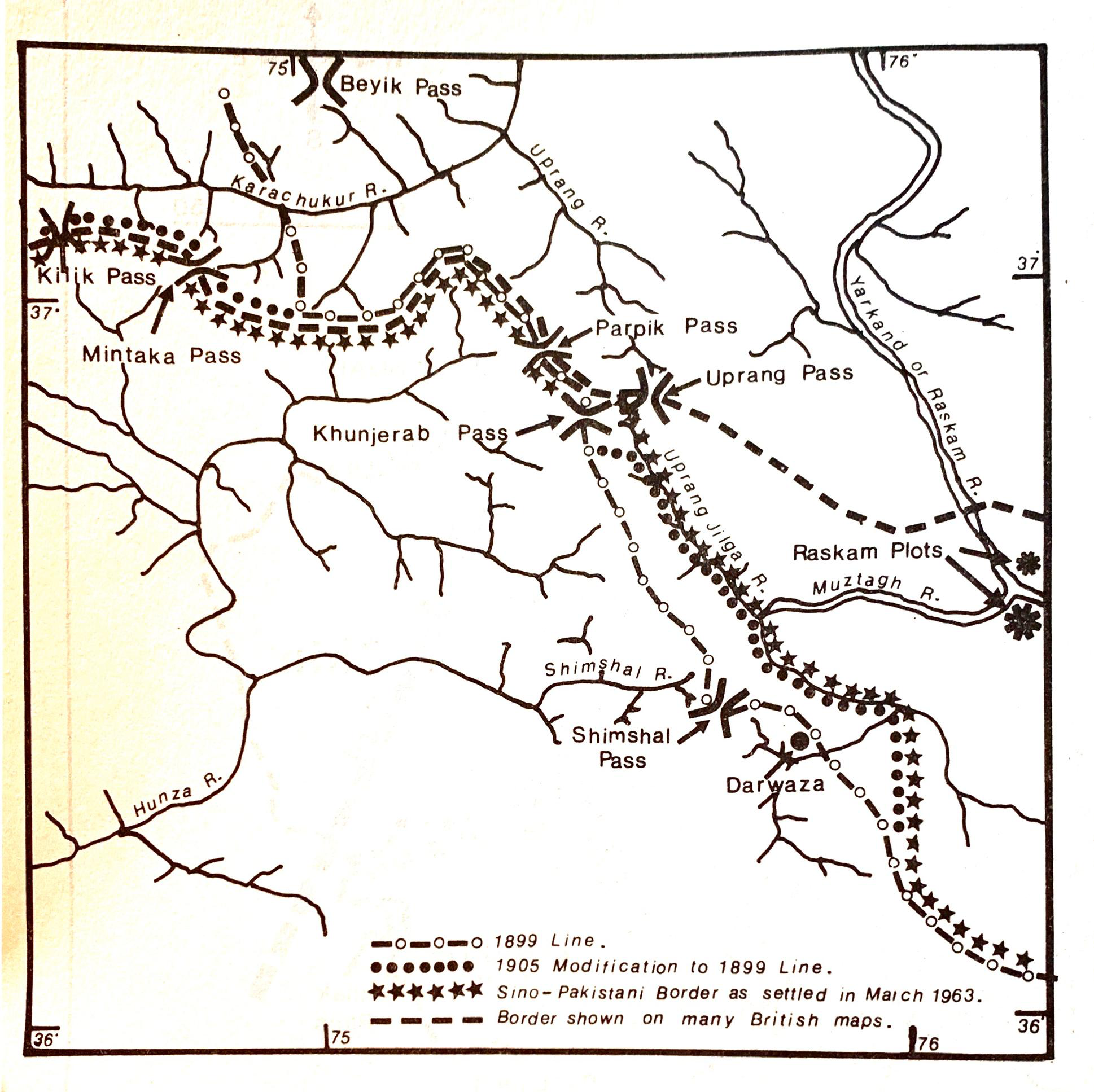
Map comparing: 1. 1899 Macartney–MacDonald Line (dashed segments with circles); 2. 1905 modification to Macartney–MacDonald Line (solid dots); 3. The China-Pakistan Border as settled in 1963 (star symbols); 4. Traditional border shown on many British maps (dashed lines)

From 1899 until the independence of India and creation of Pakistan in 1947, the representation of the border on maps varied. In 1926 Kenneth Mason explored and surveyed the Shaksgam Valley. In 1927 the Government of British India abandoned any claim to the area north of the MacDonald Line, including Shaksgam Valley, but the decision did not find its way on to British maps. By 1959, however, Chinese maps were published showing large areas west and south of the MacDonald line in China. That year, the Government of Pakistan announced its willingness to consult on the boundary question.

In 1954 the Times Atlas predominantly depicted the Cis-Kuen Lun Tract (the region between the Karakoram and Kuen Lun mountains) as a part of Kashmir under the caption "Undefined Frontier area".

== Sino-Pakistan Frontier Agreement ==
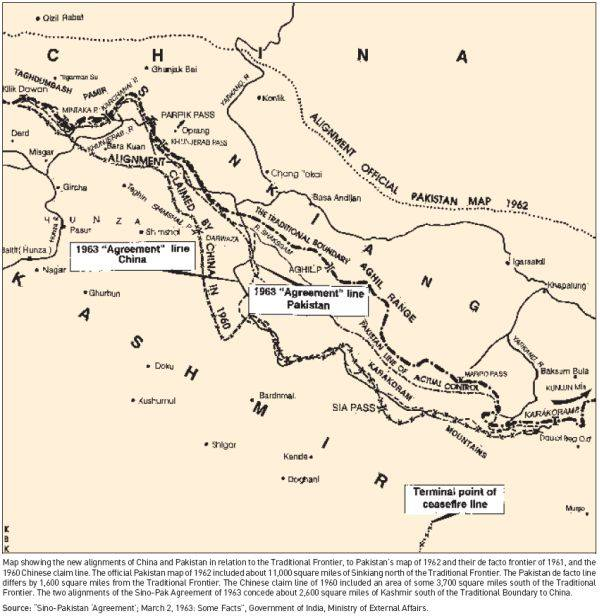
Official alignment of the Government of Pakistan in 1962 according to the Ministry of External Affairs of India. The border is in the extreme north and is depicted as a dotted line with the caption Alignment Official Pakistan Map 1962.

In 1959, the Pakistani government became concerned over Chinese maps that showed areas the Pakistanis considered their own as part of China. In 1961, Ayub Khan sent a formal note to China; there was no reply.

After Pakistan voted to grant China a seat in the United Nations, the Chinese withdrew the disputed maps in January 1962, agreeing to enter border talks in March. Negotiations between the nations officially began on October 13, 1962, and resulted in the Sino-Pakistan Agreement signed on 2 March 1963 by foreign ministers Chen Yi of China and Zulfikar Ali Bhutto of Pakistan. The resulting Sino-Pak border largely followed the MacDonald Line, with the exception of Shimshal area, where China ceded areas Pakistan claimed on the basis of grazing rights of people of Hunza.

The Indian government believes that the agreement resulted in the surrendering of a significant area to China. As claimed by Indian Prime Minister Jawaharlal Nehru in a parliamentary session, "According to the survey of Pakistan maps, even those published in 1962, about 11,000 square miles [28,000 km^{2}] of Sinkiang territory formed part of Kashmir. If one goes by these maps, Pakistan has obviously surrendered over 12,810.87 square miles [33,180.0 km^{2}] of territory". However, the Indian political analyst and historian A. G. Noorani claims that Shaksgam Valley never formed part of Kashmir, and that the northern and eastern boundaries of Kashmir remained undefined. The historian Alastair Lamb, noting the Indian stance in his analysis of the agreement, states that the Indian government has repeatedly used the agreement as to claim "existence of a Pakistan-China “axis” directed towards the humiliation of India". He further adds that the western frontiers along Karakoram had been clearly established by British note to China in 1899 and its subsequent modification in 1905 had been admitted by Chinese authorities in Xinjiang during 1930s, the same border which was more or less followed during the 1963 demarcation. According to Lamb:

There were, in fact, only three problems outstanding. First; the altered status of Hunza, once regarded by China as a tributary state, had to be accepted, even if tacitly, by Beijing. Second: the termination of old Hunza claims to territory and rights north of the Karakoram, which the British had de facto abandoned in 1936, would have to be confirmed, again tacitly if need be. Finally: the precise alignment of the Hunza-Sinkiang border, particularly in the region of the Khunjerab and Shimshal Passes, would have to be delimited. When all this had been agreed, it only remained the reconcile the maps on the two sides (based on different surveys of varying, and sometimes dubious, quality) by joint demarcation on the ground; and the job would be done. A task which the British had started with their Note to China of 1899 would have at last been completed.

Lamb claims that contrary to Indian claims, China ceded some 52 km^{2} (20 sq mi) of area to Pakistan between Shimshal Pass and Uprang Jilga River which had been placed within Chinese territory under 1905 border. The political scientist Taylor Fravel notes that China withdrew from 750 sq mi (1,942 km^{2}) of territory, including Oprang Valley, Prang and Bund Darwaza Valley, Kharachanai salt mines and the town of Sokh Bolaq. Pakistan also kept six out of seven disputed passes under its possession. Sumit Ganguly states that Pakistan gained 750 sq mi (1,942 km^{2}) in Shimshal Valley in return of ceding its claim over 1,050 sq mi (2,730 km^{2}) in Shaksgam. According to Neville Maxwell, Pakistan gave up only map claims while China had to withdraw from the territory it administered.

== See also ==
- Yinsugaiti Glacier
- Sarpo Laggo Glacier
- Siachen Glacier
- Sino-Indian conflict
- List of disputed territories of China
- List of disputed territories of India
- List of disputed territories of Pakistan

== Bibliography ==
- Schofield, Victoria (2003) [First published in 2000], Kashmir in Conflict, London and New York: I. B. Taurus & Co, ISBN 1860648983
- Snedden, Christopher (2015), Understanding Kashmir and Kashmiris, Oxford University Press, ISBN 978-1-84904-342-7
- Woodman, Dorothy (1969), Himalayan Frontiers, Barrie & Rockcliff
  - Woodman, Dorothy (1970), Himalayan Frontiers: A Political Review of British, Chinese, Indian, and Russian Rivalries, Praeger
