= Macartney–MacDonald Line =

Sino-Indian boundary proposal

The Macartney–MacDonald line is dashed in green colour.

The Macartney–MacDonald Line was a boundary proposal by the British Raj for the border between the princely state of Jammu and Kashmir and the Chinese territories of Xinjiang and Tibet. Broadly, it represented the watershed between the Indus River system and the rivers draining into the Tarim basin (the Yarkand and Karakash rivers). The line was proposed by British Indian Government to China in 1899 via its envoy in China, Sir Claude MacDonald. The Chinese Government never gave any response to the proposal. The Indian Government believed that, subsequently British India reverted to its traditional boundary, the Johnson–Ardagh Line. Independent scholars have not confirmed the claim.

It remains relevant today as a possible resolution for the Sino-Indian border dispute in the region of Aksai Chin.

== History ==
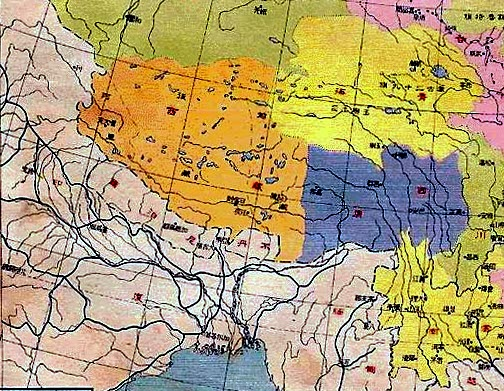
1936 map of the Republic of China, which appears to show the Macartney-MacDonald Line as the Kashmir border; both the Yarkand and Karakash river valleys are included in Xinjiang.

The Survey of India surveyor William Johnson, who was asked to survey the Kashmir area up to the "Chinese boundary", drew a border line that later came to be called the "Johnson Line". This line put the Aksai Chin region in Kashmir. The border was accepted by China for several decades. In 1893, Hung Ta-chen, the Chinese envoy at St. Petersburg, (Note: Mehra, An "agreed" frontier 1992, p. 103: "Huang Tachin (also Hung Chun or Hung Tajen) was a Chinese diplomat accredited to Russia as well as Germany, Austria-Hungary and Holland in 1887-90. During these years he rendered into Chinese a series of thirty-five maps, relating for the most part to the Sino-Russian borders.") gave maps of the region to George Macartney, the British consul at Kashgar, which coincided with it in broad details.

However, by 1896, China showed interest in Aksai Chin, reportedly with Russian instigation. As part of The Great Game between Britain and Russia, Britain favoured a revision of the prevailing boundary, ceding underpopulated border territory to be "filled out" by China. It was initially suggested by Macartney in Kashgar and developed by the Governor General of India Lord Elgin. The new boundary placed the Lingzi Tang plains, which are south of the Laktsang range, in India, and Aksai Chin proper, which is north of the Laktsang range, in China. The British presented this line, currently called the Macartney–MacDonald line, to the Chinese in a note by Sir Claude MacDonald, the British envoy in Peking. The Qing government did not respond to the note. Scholars Fisher, Rose and Huttenback comment:

This proposed border agreement would have entailed major territorial concessions by the British, since the Government of India had demonstrated both on maps and through the exercise of authority in the Aksai Chin that they considered the Kunlun range to be the de facto boundary between Sinkiang and Kashmir. Indeed, most of the territory currently in dispute between New Delhi and Peking would have been conceded to China under this settlement. The Chinese Communists must indeed find it galling that the Ch'ing Court did not even formally reply to the British offer, thus rejecting it by default.

The Macartney–MacDonald Line is a partial basis of the Sino-Pakistan Agreement. It has been suggested that a solution to the Sino-Indian border dispute could also be based on the Macartney–MacDonald Line.

== Description ==
The Macartney–MacDonald line is described as follows:

"From the Karakoram Pass the crests of the range run nearly east for about half a degree, and then turn south to a little below the 35th parallel.. Rounding... the source of the Karakash, the line of hills to be followed runs north-east to a point east of Kizil Jilga and from there, in a south-easterly direction, follows the Lak Tsung (Lokzhung) Range until that meets a spur.. which has hitherto been shown on our maps as the eastern boundary of Ladakh."

== Bibliography ==
- Fisher, Margaret W.; Rose, Leo E.; Huttenback, Robert A. (1963), Himalayan Battleground: Sino-Indian Rivalry in Ladakh, Praeger
- Hoffmann, Steven A. (1990), India and the China Crisis, University of California Press, ISBN 978-0-520-06537-6
- Mehra, Parshotam (1992), An "agreed" frontier: Ladakh and India's northernmost borders, 1846-1947, Oxford University Press, ISBN 9780195627589
- Woodman, Dorothy (1970) [first published 1969 by Barrie & Rockliff, The Cresset Press], Himalayan Frontiers: A Political Review of British, Chinese, Indian, and Russian Rivalries, Praeger
