= William Johnson (surveyor) =

British surveyor, Governor of Ladakh

William H. Johnson (died 3 March 1883) was a British surveyor in the Great Trigonometric Survey of India. He is noted for the first definition of the eastern boundary of Ladakh along Aksai Chin in the princely state of Jammu and Kashmir, which has come to be called the 'Johnson Line'. After retiring from the Survey of India, Johnson was appointed as the Governor of Ladakh, in which position he served until his death.

== Early life ==
Johnson was born in India to an Ordinance officer of the East India Company, who lived in "Deyrah". He was educated at Mussorie and joined the Civil Branch of the Great Trigonometric Survey (the precursor of the Survey of India), where he was trained by Andrew Scott Waugh.

== Career ==
Johnson began his career as a surveyor in 1848 under Captain du Vernet in the North-West Himalayan Survey. After du Vernet moved to Assam in 1852, he worked for some time doing route surveys in Punjab, then the survey of the Chenab River, and the survey of Bhagirathi and Kanawar. In 1854, he ascended the snowy peak near the Néla pass, which was regarded as a considerable accomplishment.

In 1855, he joined the newly formed Kashmir Survey party to survey the princely state of Jammu and Kashmir (created in 1846 under British suzerainty). He was second-in-command to Thomas George Montgomerie but in fact took a leading role of the Ladakh team on account of Montgomerie being busy in Srinagar. He led the survey of the Pir Panjal range, Kishenganga valley, Chandrabhaga valley, and later the Indus and Shyok river valleys. He ascended some of the tallest peaks in the line of this work. He also connected the Kashmir triangulation with that of the North-West Himalaya, resulting in his triangulation stations situated in Kashmir region remaining the highest in the world for sixty years.

Starting in 1862, Johnson worked from Leh in Ladakh, surveying all the way to the Chinese frontier. He surveyed the Chang Chenmo valley and the plateau to the north of it. In 1865, he undertook his famous journey to Khotan, which garnered him notability as well as controversy.

=== Expedition to Khotan and the Johnson Line ===
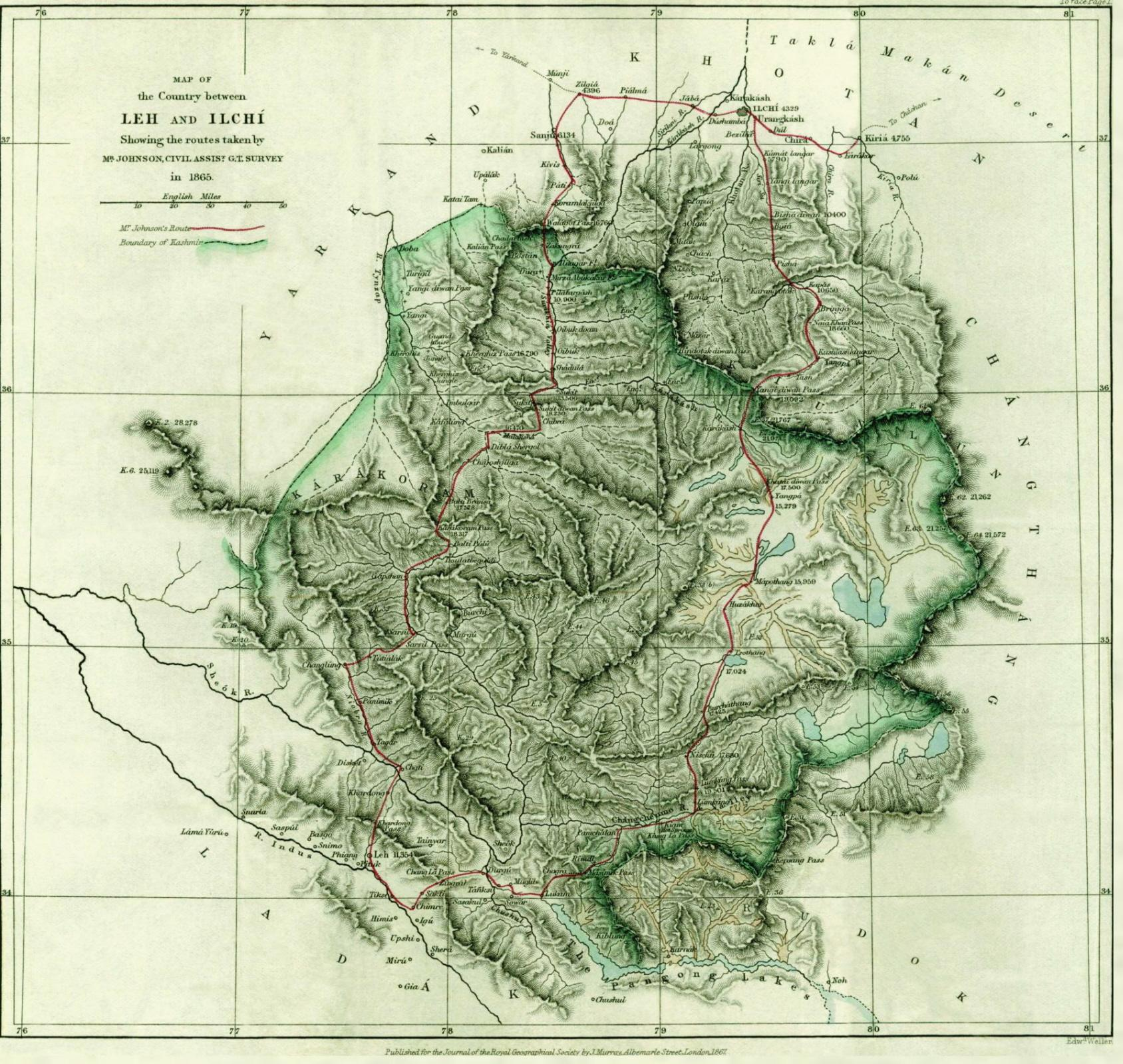
The "Johnson Line" marking the boundary of Kashmir. Johnson's 1865 journey to Khotan marked in red.

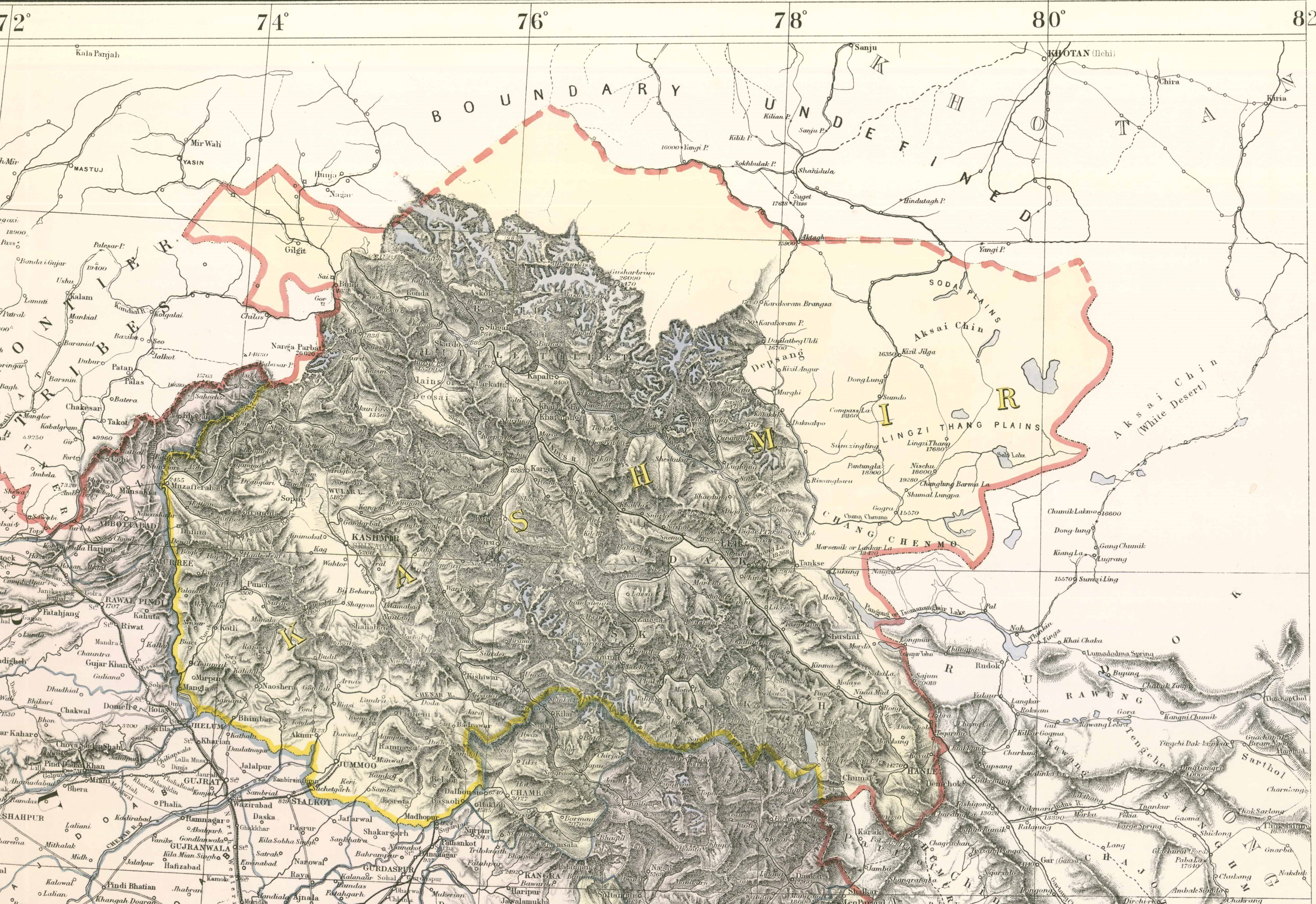
Boundary of Kashmir in the 1888 Survey of India map of India. The undefined boundary shown in dash line from Malubiting, Raskam, Aktagh to Karakunlun Shan 35.28312°N 80.261863°E

After the Chinese rule collapsed in Turkestan in 1863, the governor of Ladakh, Mehta Mangal, sent a small force to Shahidullah, a strategic point between the Karakoram range and Kunlun Mountains, and constructed a chauki (police post). These developments were likely known to Johnson.

In May 1865, Johnson was commissioned to survey the Kashmir series "beyond and to the north of the Chang Chenmo valley". He set out on his expedition two months later, with a party consisting of fifty coolies (porters), an attendant, five mules, six horses and a state trooper. Governor Mehta Mangal is said to have made all the arrangements for his expedition. Johnson quickly went over to the heretofore unexplored territory of Aksai Chin. According to scholar John Lall, Johnson maintained an average speed of 19.2 miles a day through "barren country at heights between 15,000 to 19,500 feet". He spent twenty days at the source of the Karakash River doing surveys and recording his findings.

From this location, Johnson made a journey to Khotan (referred to as "Ilchi" in British records), spent 18 days there and returned via the Karakoram Pass. Why he went to Khotan remains controversial. Johnson's own statement was that he received an invitation from the Khan of Khotan via a messenger. However, John Lall states that there was not enough time for a messenger to come from Khotan and return within the time frame given by Johnson. He believes that Johnson must have sent a message to the Khan of Khotan and invited himself. He also states that Johnson was censured by the British government for crossing the frontier without permission and that he later changed his story to say that he was forcibly taken to Khotan.

The journey made Johnson's reputation as a traveller. He reported on it to the British Association for the Advancement of Science in 1866, and was elected a Fellow of the Royal Geographical Society in the same year. But the unauthorised journey met with official disapproval; and he resigned from the Survey of India the following year. Nevertheless Johnson's results were highly prized among the British surveyors, and Johnson was reemployed in 1869 on an even higher salary.

Part of Johnson's legacy was the "Johnson Line", or "Ardagh–Johnson Line", the boundary of Ladakh in the north and the northeast, including the entire Aksai Chin plateau and going up to the Kunlun Mountains. It was later endorsed by the Chief of British Military Intelligence Sir John Ardagh as the suitable northern boundary of the British Indian Empire. It assumed later importance in the Sino-Indian border dispute, after China had occupied Tibet.

=== Jammu and Kashmir ===
Johnson took up a position for the Maharajah of Kashmir and Jammu in 1871, as the governor (Wazir-e-wazarat) of Ladakh. R. H. Phillimore states that the position earned him three times the salary he had formerly received as a surveyor.

During his tenure as the Wazir, Johnson facilitated the third covert journey of the native explorer Nain Singh Rawat into Tibet.

== Death ==
Johnson died in Jammu, believing he had been poisoned.

His daughter, Teresa Johnson, married Rowland Allanson-Winn, 5th Baron Headley, Irish peer.

== Works ==
- Report on His Journey to Ilchí, the Capital of Khotan, in Chinese Tartary

=== Reception ===
H. H. Godwin-Austen, a distinguished surveyor, said that "there were few men living who had greater experience of mountain work, and none who had ascended to greater heights, and the work he did was of considerable value and magnitude". He cited Johnson's expedition to Khotan as an example of valuable knowledge that could have been gained had the British Government of India encouraged such work, and stated that the views of officers of the Survey of India were disregarded by the government. The official report of the Great Trigonometrical Survey (1865–66) called his explorations "most valuable and important", and Johnson was commended for his "great energy and perseverance". The Royal Geographical Society honoured him in 1875 and presented him with a gold watch for his 1865 survey journey. Frederick Drew, another surveyor and geologist in Jammu and Kashmir, called him a "bold and enduring traveller". Surveyor-General Walker was more critical, stating that Johnson's report and map required extensive corrections before publication and that the original map "would have done more harm than good to the cause of geography".

== Bibliography ==
- Lall, John (1989), "Maps and Traditional Boundaries of Ladakh", China Report, 25 (1): 1–10, doi:10.1177/000944558902500101, S2CID 154641762
- Mehra, Parshotham (1991), ""John Lall, Aksai Chin and Sino-Indian Conflict" (Book review)", China Report, 27 (2): 147–154, doi:10.1177/000944559102700206, S2CID 153622885
- Waller, Derek (2004), The Pundits: British Exploration of Tibet and Central Asia, University Press of Kentucky, ISBN 978-0-8131-9100-3
