= Sarikol =

Sarikol, Sariqol, or Sarykol may refer to:

- Sarikol Range, a mountain range on the border with Tajikistan and China
- Tashkurgan, a town in Xinjiang, China that historically was also known as Sarikol
- Sarikol kingdom, a historical kingdom of the Pamir Mountains, mentioned in Chinese records, whose capital was at Tashkurgan
- Sarikoli language, a Pamir language
- Tajiks of Xinjiang, who are also known as Sarikolis
- Sarykol District, a district of Kostanay Province in northern Kazakhstan
- Zorkul, a lake in the Pamir Mountains formerly known as Lake Sarikol

== See also ==
- Tashkurgan (disambiguation)
