= Tashkurgan (disambiguation) =

Tashkurgan is a town in western Xinjiang, China. It may also refer to:

- Tashkurgan Tajik Autonomous County, in Xinjiang, China
- Tashkurgan River, a river in Xinjiang, China
- Tashkurgan, a village on the upper reaches of the Bartang River in Tajikistan
- Tash-Kurgan, a town in southwestern Kyrgyzstan
- Khulm, a town in northern Afghanistan formerly known as Tashkurgan
- Khulm River, a river in Afghanistan, also known as the Tashkurgan River
