= Khunjerab =

Khunjerab may refer to:

- Khunjerab Pass, the highest paved road crossing of an international border in the world, between China and Pakistan
- Khunjerab National Park, in Pakistan
- Tashkurgan Khunjerab Airport, in Xinjiang, China
