= Tizinafu River =

- Native name: 提兹那甫河 (Chinese); 提孜那甫河 (Chinese); تىزناپ دەرياسى (Uyghur); تىزنېف دەريۇ (Sarikoli)

Location
- Country: People's Republic of China
- Region: Xinjiang Uygur Autonomous Region

Physical characteristics
- Length: 335 kilometres

The Tizinafu River (Uyghur: تىزناپ دەرياسى, Tiznap deryasi; Chinese: 提兹那甫河, 提孜那甫河), also spelled Tiznef River, Tiznaf River, Tiznap River, Tizinapu River, formerly known as the Tingzaabu River (听杂阿布河), is a river in the Xinjiang Uygur Autonomous Region of the People's Republic of China, located in southeast Kashi, originates in the northern slope of the Kunlun Mountains.

Historically, the Tizinafu River was once a tributary of the Yarkand River and gradually evolved into an independent river under water diversion from the plain irrigation area. The river has a total length of 335 kilometers, a catchment area of about 20,390 square kilometers, and an average annual runoff of about 845 million cubic meters.
