= Tashkurgan Tajik Autonomous County =

Autonomous county in western Xinjiang, China

- Autonomous county

Name transcription(s)
  - Chinese: 塔什库尔干塔吉克自治县
  - Uyghur: تاشقۇرغان تاجىك ئاپتونوم ناھىيىسى
  - Sarikoli: تاشقۈرغان تۇجىك ئافتۇنۇم نايە
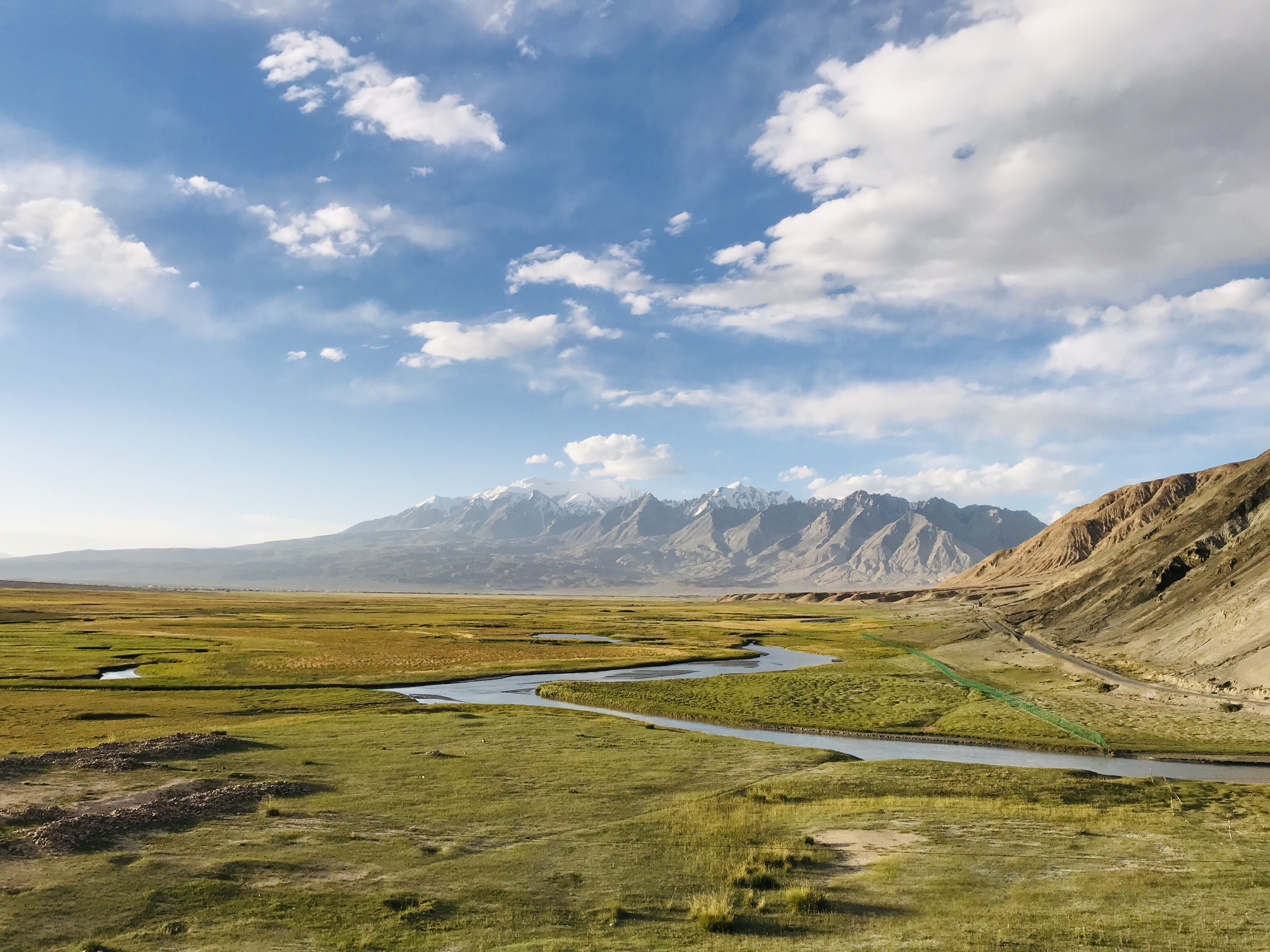
- View of Muztagh Ata from the Karakoram Highway

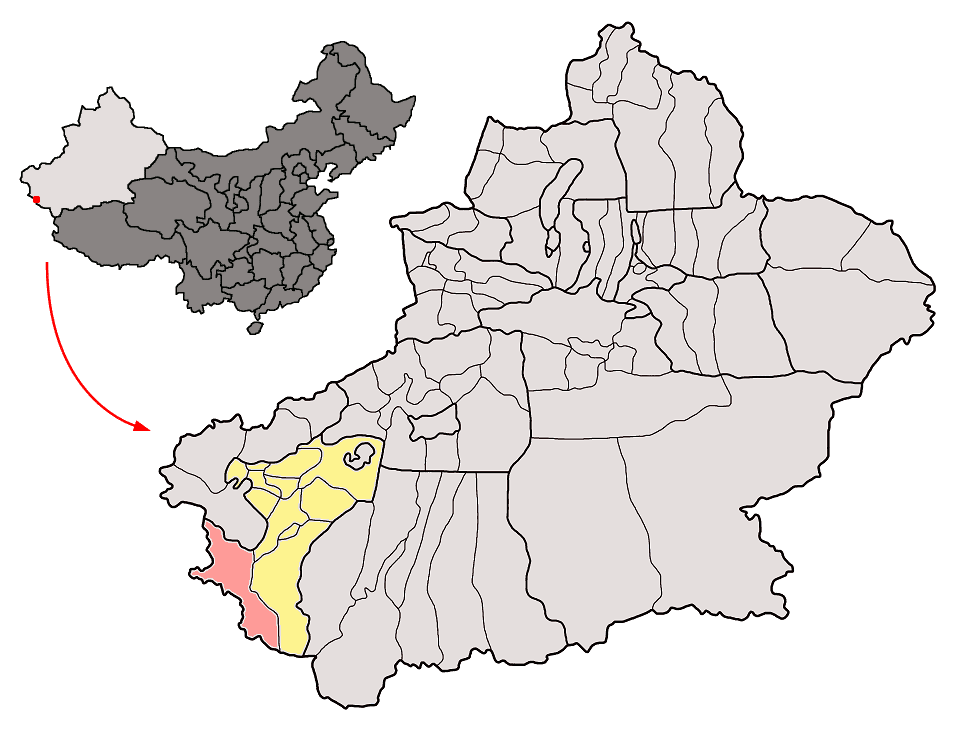
- Tashkurgan County (red) in Kashgar Prefecture (yellow) and Xinjiang

- Location of county seat in Xinjiang Tashkurgan (Xinjiang) Tashkurgan (China)
- Coordinates: 37°46′20″N 75°13′48″E
- Country: China
- Autonomous region: Xinjiang
- Prefecture: Kashgar
- County seat: Tashkurgan
- Township-level divisions: 12

Area
  - Total: 25,000 km^{2} (9,700 sq mi)
- Elevation: 3,094 m (10,151 ft)

Population (2020)
  - Total: 39,946
  - Density: 1.6/km^{2} (4.1/sq mi)

Ethnic groups
  - Major ethnic groups: Pamiris in China (Pamiris)
- Time zone: UTC+8 (China Standard (Note: Locals in Xinjiang frequently observe UTC+6 (Xinjiang Time), 2 hours behind Beijing.))
- Postal code: 845250
- Area code: 998
- Website: www.tskeg.gov.cn (in Chinese)

Tashkurgan Tajik Autonomous County
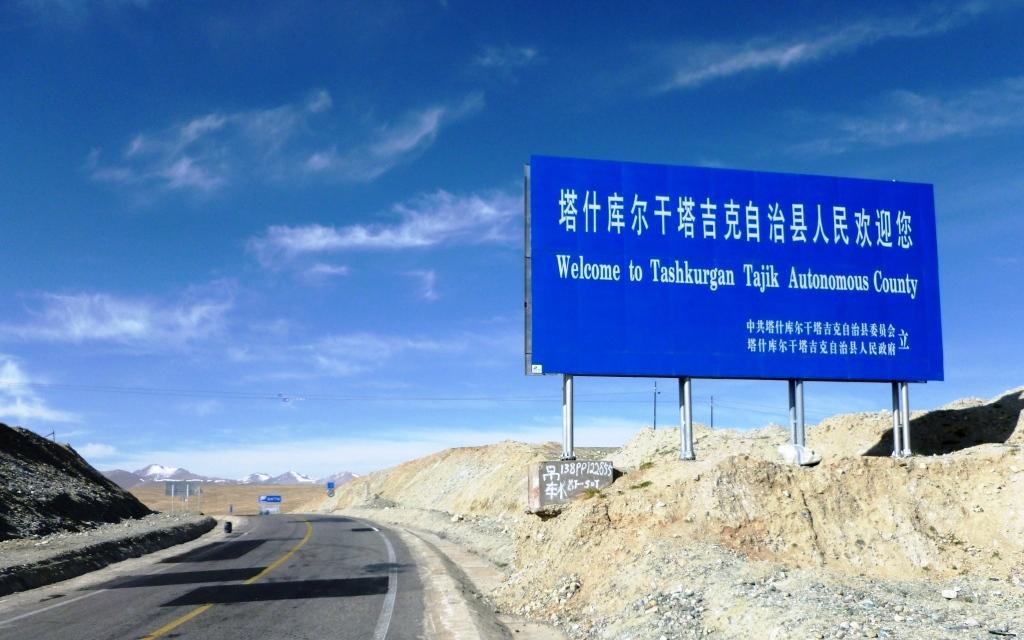
- A sign welcoming motorists to Tashkurgan Tajik Autonomous County

Chinese name
- Simplified Chinese: 塔什库尔干塔吉克自治县
- Traditional Chinese: 塔什庫爾干塔吉克自治縣
- Hanyu Pinyin: Tǎshíkù'ěrgān Tǎjíkè Zìzhìxiàn
Transcriptions
Standard Mandarin
- Hanyu Pinyin: Tǎshíkù'ěrgān Tǎjíkè Zìzhìxiàn
- Gwoyeu Romatzyh: Taashyrkuh'eelgan Taajyikeh Tzyhjyhshiann
- Wade–Giles: Tʻa^{3}-shih^{2}-kʻu^{4}-êrh^{3}-kan^{1} Tʻa^{3}-chi^{2}-kʻo^{4} Tzŭ^{4}-chih^{4}-hsien^{4}
- Yale Romanization: Tǎshŕkùěrgān Tǎjíkè Dz̀jr̀syàn
- IPA: [tʰà.ʂɻ̩̌.kʰû.àɚ.kán tʰà.tɕǐ.kʰɤ̂ tsɹ̩̂.ʈʂɻ̩̂.ɕjɛ̂n]

Uyghur name
- Uyghur: تاشقۇرغان تاجىك ئاپتونوم ناھىيىسى
Transcriptions
- Latin Yëziqi: Tashqurghan Tajik Aptonom Nahiyisi
- Yengi Yeziⱪ: Taxⱪurƣan Tajik Aptonom Naⱨiyisi
- Siril Yëziqi: Tашқурған таҗик аптоном наһийиси

Sarikoli name
- Sarikoli: تاشقۈرغان تۇجىك ئافتۇنۇم نايە; Toxkhürghon Tujik Oftunum Noya (Note: There is no official orthography for Sarikoli in China. This is the spelling used in the Sarikoli-Chinese dictionary written by linguist Gao Erqiang.) [tɔʃqyrʁɔn tuʤik ɔftunum nɔja]

Tashkurgan Tajik Autonomous County (officially spelled Taxkorgan) is an autonomous county of Kashgar Prefecture, in western Xinjiang, China. The county seat is Tashkurgan. The county is the only Pamiri in China autonomous county in China.

== History ==
During the Han dynasty, the town of Tashkurgan was known as Puli (Chinese: 蒲犁; pinyin: Púlí); during the Tang dynasty, it was a protectorate of the Sassanids, during the Yuan dynasty it was part of the Chaghatai empire. It was part of China during the Qing dynasty.

Many centuries later, Tashkurgan became the capital of the Sarikol kingdom (色勒库尔), a kingdom of the Pamir Mountains, and later of Qiepantuo (朅盘陀) under the Persian Empire. At the northeast corner of the town is a huge fortress known as the Princess Castle dating from the Yuan dynasty (1279–1368 CE) and the subject of many colourful local legends. A ruined fire temple is near the fortress.

The region came under Chinese rule from Qing dynasty, to the Republic of China and later on to the People's Republic of China.

On September 17, 1954, Tashkurgan was made an autonomous region (Chinese: 自治区). In February 1955, it was made an autonomous county (Chinese: 自治县).

In 1955, Bulungkol was transferred to Akto County from Tashkurgan County.

In August 2013, the Chinese Academy of Social Sciences announced that they excavated a cluster of Zoroastrian tombs in Tashkurgan.

In May 2017, the county was hit with a magnitude 5.5 earthquake that killed eight and injured 29.

== Geography ==
Tashkurgan County is located in the eastern part of the Pamir Plateau, where the Kunlun, Karakoram, Hindukush and Tian Shan mountains come together, at the borders with Afghanistan (Wakhan Corridor), Tajikistan (Gorno-Badakhshan Province), Pakistan (Gilgit-Baltistan) and India (Ladakh). The county seat is Tashkurgan Town.

The territorial expanse of the county is 178 kilometres (111 mi) from north to south and 140 kilometres (87 mi) from east to west, the total area is about 25,000 square kilometres (9,700 mi^{2}), with an average altitude above 4,000 metres (13,000 ft). The county includes a significant part of the Trans-Karakoram Tract, disputed by India and Pakistan in the ongoing Kashmir conflict; while Pakistan and China settled the border issue in 1963, India continues to claim it as part of the state of Jammu and Kashmir.

The Muztagh Ata, at 7,546 metres (24,757 ft), and the Kongur Tagh, at 7,719 metres (25,325 ft), are the main peaks in the county, while the two main rivers are the Tashkurgan River and the Tiznap River. By including the Trans-Karakoram Tract, the county also borders several eight-thousanders, including K2, at 8,611 metres (28,251 ft) the second-highest mountain in the world.

The area has a sizable amount of mineral water, glacial water, and hot springs. The county has 23 glacial water springs, with an annual output of 30,000,000 cubic metres (1.1×10^{9} cu ft).

=== Climate ===
Tashkurgan has a cold desert climate (Köppen BWk), influenced by the high elevation, with long, very cold winters, and warm summers. Monthly daily average temperatures range from −11.9 °C (10.6 °F) in January to 16.4 °C (61.5 °F) in July, while the annual mean is 3.58 °C (38.4 °F). An average of only 68 millimetres (2.68 in) of precipitation falls per year.

Climate data for Tashkurgan, elevation 3,090 m (10,140 ft), (1991–2020 normals, extremes 1971–2010)
Month	Jan	Feb	Mar	Apr	May	Jun	Jul	Aug	Sep	Oct	Nov	Dec	Year
Record high °C (°F)	6.5 (43.7)	12.2 (54.0)	18.9 (66.0)	22.0 (71.6)	25.1 (77.2)	31.0 (87.8)	32.5 (90.5)	31.4 (88.5)	27.8 (82.0)	22.7 (72.9)	14.3 (57.7)	10.5 (50.9)	32.5 (90.5)
Mean daily maximum °C (°F)	−4.1 (24.6)	0.3 (32.5)	7.4 (45.3)	13.3 (55.9)	17.4 (63.3)	20.9 (69.6)	24.1 (75.4)	23.3 (73.9)	19.2 (66.6)	12.2 (54.0)	5.7 (42.3)	−1.3 (29.7)	11.5 (52.8)
Daily mean °C (°F)	−11.8 (10.8)	−6.8 (19.8)	0.7 (33.3)	6.6 (43.9)	10.4 (50.7)	13.8 (56.8)	16.8 (62.2)	16.1 (61.0)	11.9 (53.4)	4.7 (40.5)	−2.3 (27.9)	−9.2 (15.4)	4.2 (39.6)
Mean daily minimum °C (°F)	−18.6 (−1.5)	−13.9 (7.0)	−6.3 (20.7)	−0.2 (31.6)	3.7 (38.7)	7.1 (44.8)	9.9 (49.8)	9.4 (48.9)	4.1 (39.4)	−3.1 (26.4)	−9.6 (14.7)	−15.9 (3.4)	−2.8 (27.0)
Record low °C (°F)	−40.1 (−40.2)	−36.0 (−32.8)	−25.7 (−14.3)	−11.5 (11.3)	−5.6 (21.9)	−1.0 (30.2)	2.2 (36.0)	−0.2 (31.6)	−5.0 (23.0)	−12.2 (10.0)	−23.3 (−9.9)	−31.5 (−24.7)	−40.1 (−40.2)
Average precipitation mm (inches)	2.7 (0.11)	3.5 (0.14)	3.2 (0.13)	5.3 (0.21)	11.7 (0.46)	19.7 (0.78)	13.6 (0.54)	12.7 (0.50)	7.8 (0.31)	2.1 (0.08)	0.8 (0.03)	2.3 (0.09)	85.4 (3.38)
Average precipitation days (≥ 0.1 mm)	2.4	2.5	2.3	2.8	5.9	7.6	6.8	6.3	2.9	1.9	0.4	1.4	43.2
Average snowy days	3.6	3.7	4.7	4.8	3.1	0.5	0	0	0.4	2.8	1.3	2.0	26.9
Average relative humidity (%)	52	46	36	33	37	41	40	42	41	38	40	47	41
Mean monthly sunshine hours	174.9	171.1	229.6	258.9	282.3	296.3	314.2	285.2	269.8	254.6	212.3	181.1	2,930.3
Percentage possible sunshine	57	55	61	65	64	67	71	69	74	75	71	61	66
Source 1: China Meteorological Administration
Source 2: Weather China

== Administrative divisions ==
The county administers 2 towns, 9 townships and 1 ethnic township, which then administer 50 village-level divisions.

Name	Sarikoli (Uyghur Arabic)	Sarikoli (in IPA)	Uyghur (Erep Yeziⱪi)	Uyghur (Siril Yezik)	Uyghur (ULY)	Chinese (Simplified)	Pinyin
Tashkurgan Town	تاشقۈرغان بۇزۇر	tɔɕqyrʁɔn buzur	تاشقۇرغان بازىرى	Ташқурған базири	Tashqurghan baziri	塔什库尔干镇	Tǎshíkù'ěrgān Zhèn
Tajik Abat	تۇجىك ئاباد بۇزۇر	tud͡ʑikɔbɔd buzur	تاجىك ئابات بازىرى	Таҗик Абaт базири	Tajik Abat baziri	塔吉克阿巴提镇	Tǎjíkè Ābātí Zhèn
Tashkurgan Township	تاشقۈرغان دىيۇر	tɔɕqyrʁɔn diyur	تاشقۇرغان يېزىسى	Ташқурған йәзиси	Tashqurghan yëzisi	塔什库尔干乡	Tǎshíkù'ěrgān Xiāng
Tagarma Township	تەغەرمى دىيۇر	taʁarmi diyur	تاغارما يېزىسى	Тағарма йәзиси	Tagharma yëzisi	塔合曼乡	Tǎhémàn Xiāng
Tiznap Township	تىزنېف دىيۇر	tiznef diyur	تىزناپ يېزىسى	Тизнап йәзиси	Tiznap yëzisi	提孜那甫乡	Tízīnàfǔ Xiāng
Dafdar Township	ذەۋذار دىيۇر	ðavðɔr diyur	دەفتەر يېزىسى	Дәфтәр йәзиси	Defter yëzisi	达布达尔乡	Dábùdá'ěr Xiāng
Waqa Township	ۋەچە دىيۇر	wat͡ɕa diyur	ۋەچە يېزىسى	Вәчә йәзиси	Weche yëzisi	瓦恰乡	Wǎqià Xiāng
Baldir Township	بەلدىر دىيۇر	baldir diyur	بەلدىر يېزىسى	Балдир йәзиси	Beldir yëzisi	班迪尔乡	Bāndí'ěr Xiāng
Maryang Township	مەرياڭ دىيۇر	marjɔŋ diyur	مارياڭ يېزىسى	Маряң йәзиси	Maryang yëzisi	马尔洋乡	Mǎ'ěryáng Xiāng
Datong Township	تۈڭ دىيۇر	tyŋ diyur	داتۇڭ يېزىسى	Датуң йәзиси	Datung yëzisi	大同乡	Dàtóng Xiāng
Koguxluk Township	قۇغۇشلۇغ دىيۇر	quʁuɕluʁ diyur	قوغۇشلۇق يېزىسى	Қоғухлуқ йәзиси	Qoghushluq yëzisi	库科西鲁格乡	Kùkēxīlǔgé Xiāng
Kokyar Kyrgyz Township^{1}	کاکيەر قىرغىز مىلى دىيۇر	kɔkjar qirʁiz mili diyur	كۆكيار قىرغىز مىللىي يېزىسى	Көкяр Қирғиз миллий йәзиси	Kökyar Qirghiz milliy yëzisi	科克亚尔柯尔克孜族乡	Kēkèyà'ěr Kē'ěrkèzīzú xiāng

- Mazar sheep breeding farm (麻扎尔种羊场)
- Buhoi Jirap farm (布候依吉拉甫农场))
- Dairy farm (牛奶场)
- Bazadax forest farm (巴扎达什牧林场)

Notes

1. Official Kyrgyz name of Kokyar Kyrgyz Township: كۅكجار قىرعىز ۇلۇتتۇق ايىلى (Көкжар Кыргыз улуттуқ айылы / Kökcar Kyrgyz ayyly)

== Demographics ==
Historical population
Year	Pop.	±% p.a.
1995	27,800	—
2000	30,454	+1.84%
2010	37,843	+2.20%

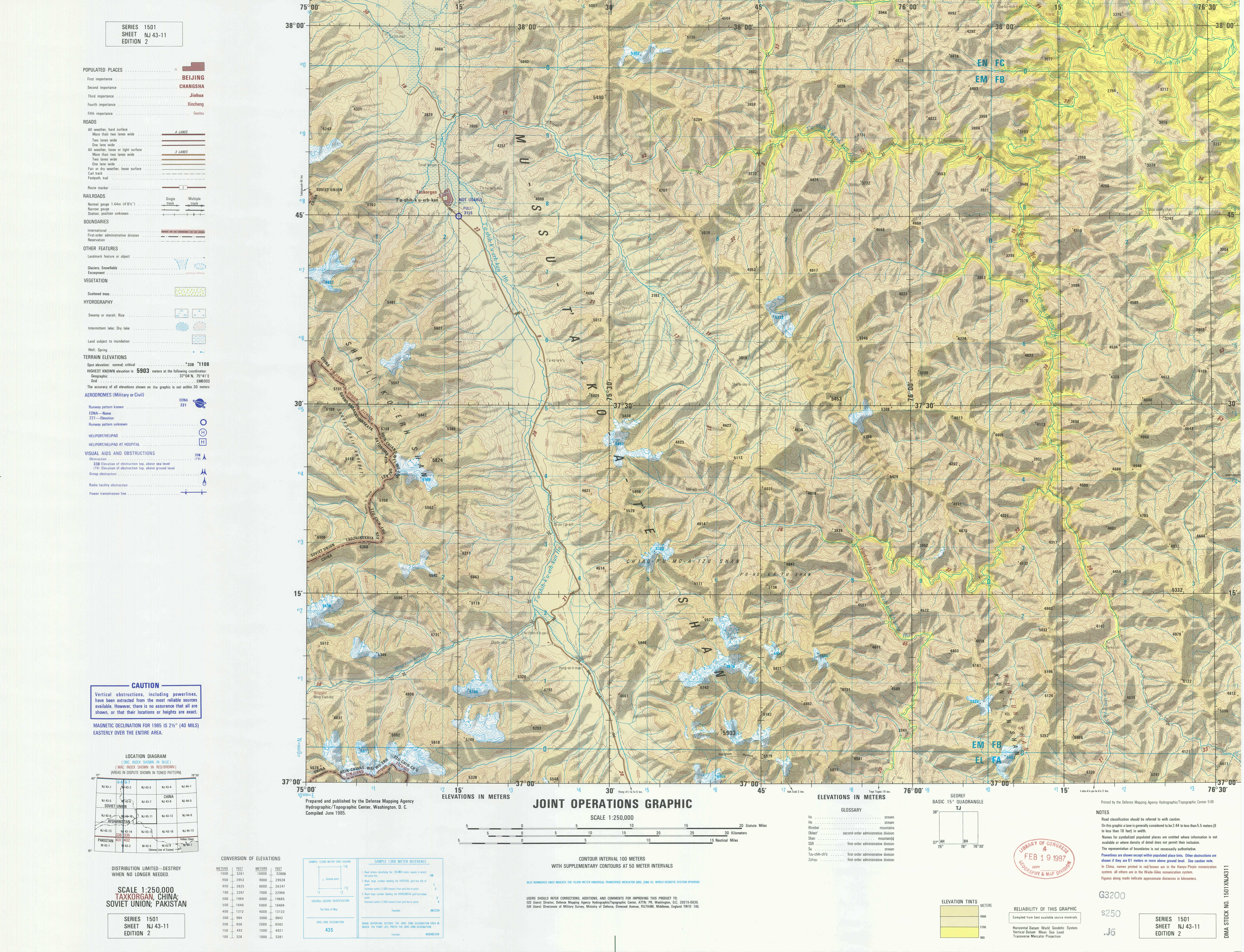
Map including Tashkurgan (T'a-shih-k'u-erh-kan) (DMA, 1985)

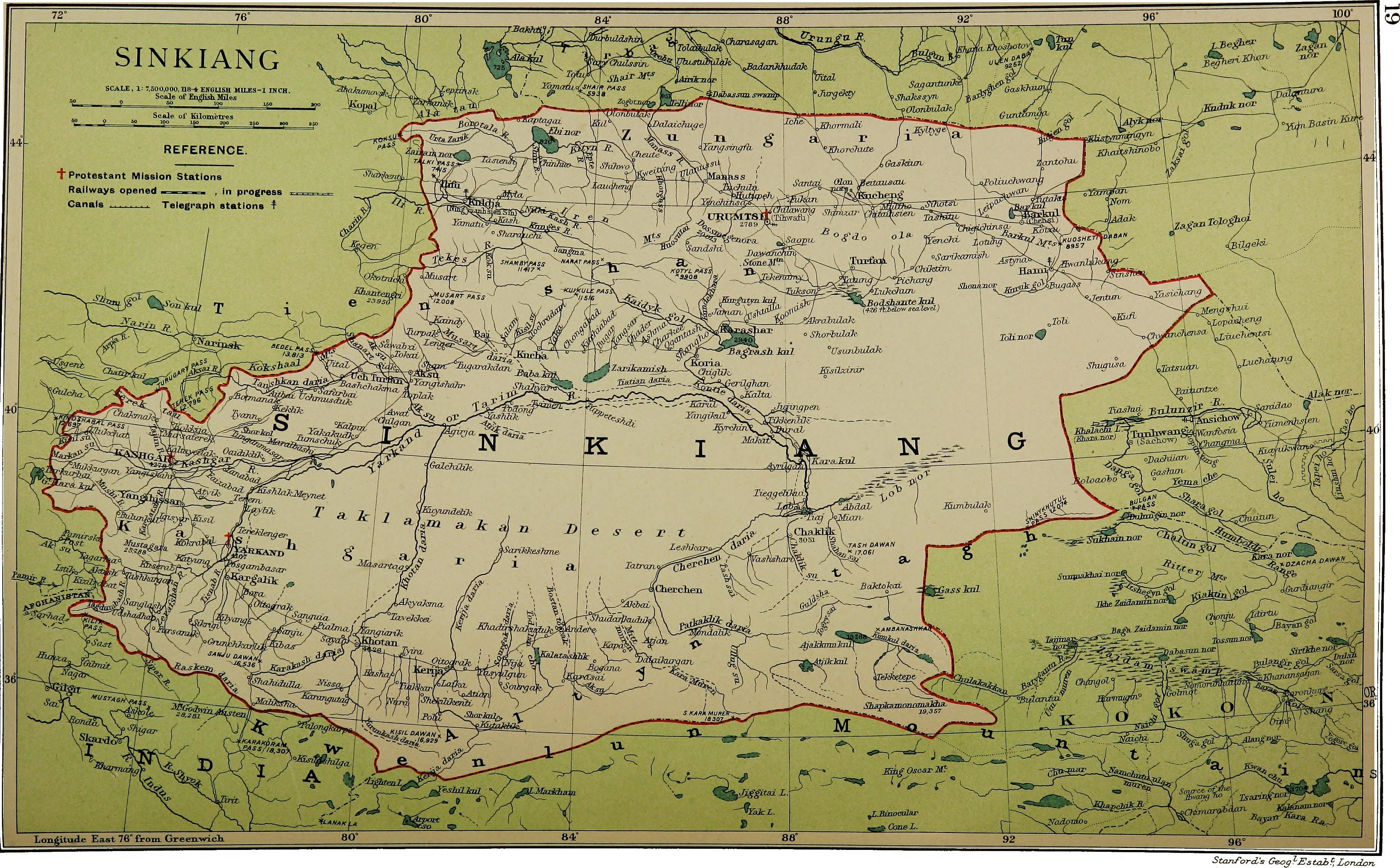
Map including Tashkurgan (labeled as Tashkargan) (1917)

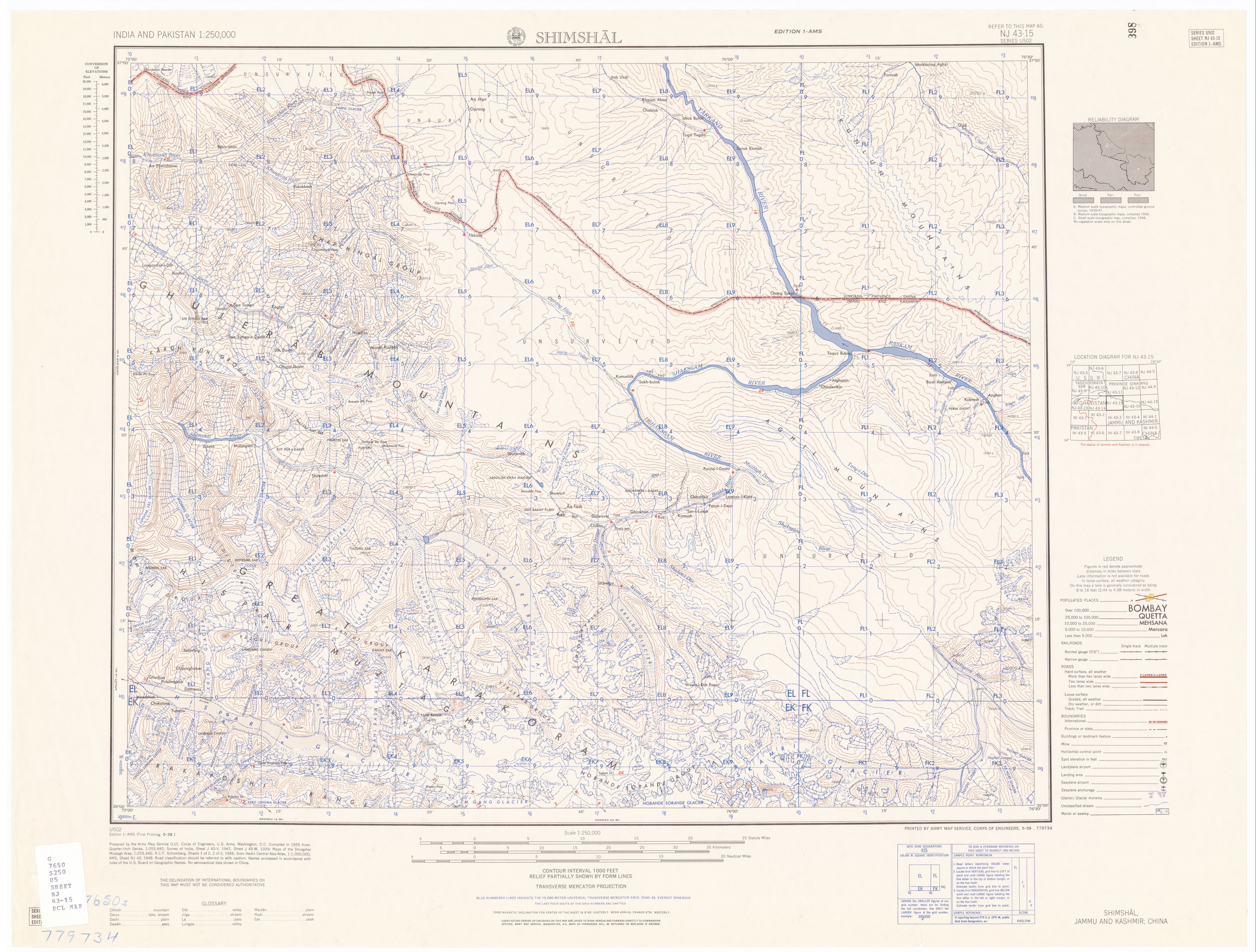
Map including areas in the southern part of today's Tashkurgan Tajik Autonomous County (AMS, 1955)

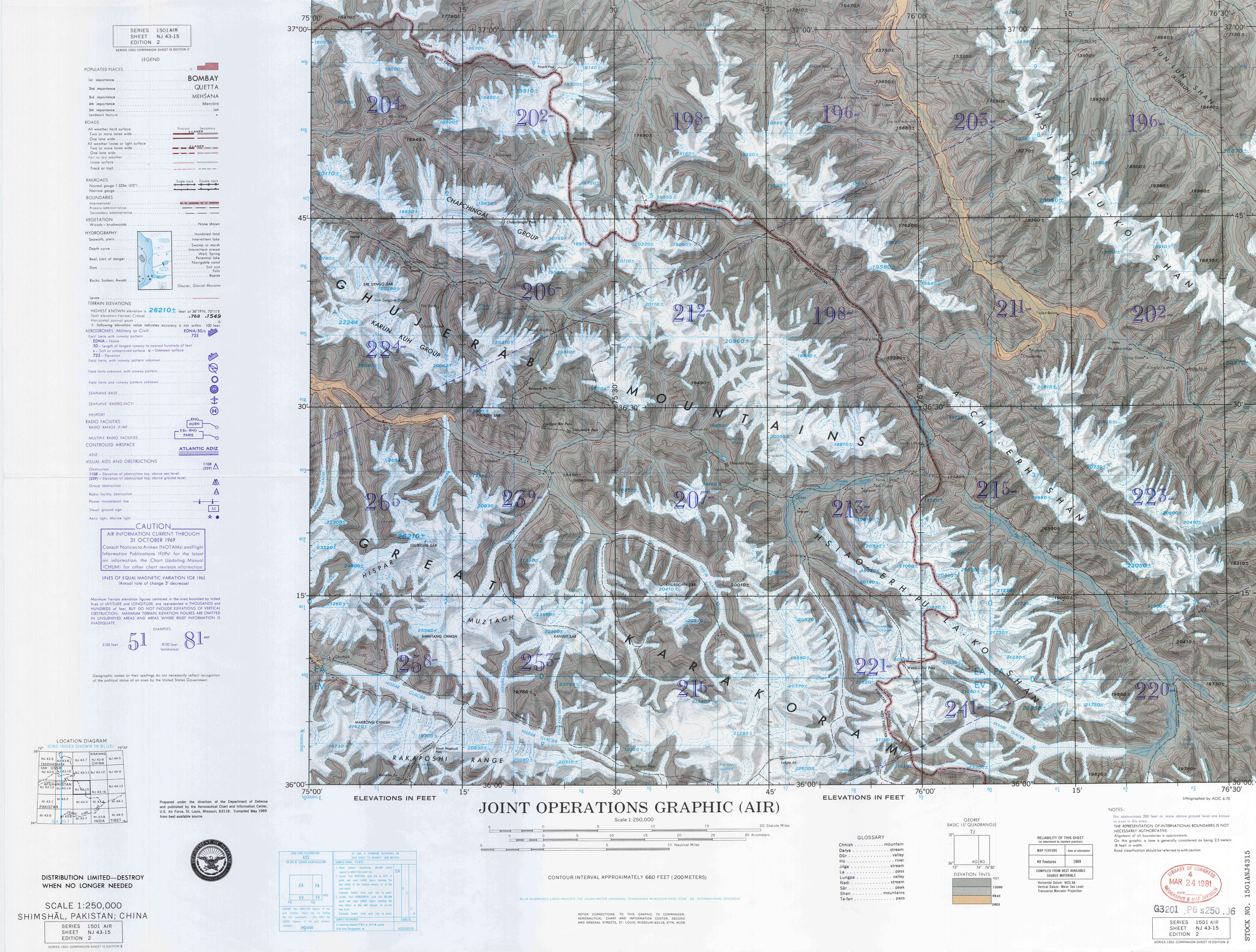
Map including areas in the southern part of today's Tashkurgan Tajik Autonomous County (ACIC, 1969)

As of 2018, Tashkurgan County had a population of 40,999, up slightly from the 40,381 reported in 2015, and the 37,843 counted in the 2010 Chinese census.

=== Ethnic composition ===
Tashkurgan Tajik(Pamiris) Autonomous County Ethnic Composition
Ethnic group	2015		2018	
Pamiris	32,867	81.39%	33,718	82.24%
Han Chinese	2,911	7.21%	2,690	6.56%
Kyrgyz	2,320	5.75%	2,369	5.78%
Uyghur	2,179	5.40%	2,131	5.20%
Hui	30	0.07%	29	0.07%
Kazakh	15	0.04%	15	0.04%
Manchu	9	0.02%	6	0.01%
Mongol	9	0.02%	6	0.01%
Sibe	7	0.02%	6	0.01%
Russian	1	< 0.01%	0	0.00%
Others	33	0.08%	29	0.07%
Total	40,381	100.00%	40,999	100.00%

Tajiks make up an overwhelming majority of the county's population, with recent figures indicating they make up somewhere from 80.9% of the population, to 82.24%. Other prominent ethnic groups include the Han Chinese, the Kyrgyz, and Uyghurs.

In 1999, 6.28% of the population of Tashkurgan County was Han Chinese and 5.08% of the population was Uyghur.

In 1995, the total population of Tashkurgan was 27,800, among them 84% Pamiris of Xinjiang, who speak the Sarikoli language, 4% Han and 12% other nationalities.

== Economy ==
Animal husbandry is the primary economic mode with agriculture. The well-known Dunbashi fat-tailed sheep (敦巴什大尾羊) are raised in the county as well as domestic yaks. Agricultural products include highland barley, wheat, and others. Mineral resources include iron, sulfur, asbestos, black jasper, and jade. In 2011, the county was considered relatively poor. 90% of the residents were engaged in animal husbandry.

The annual per capita disposable income in 2023 totaled ¥35,356 for the county's urban residents, and ¥11,998 for the county's rural residents. These figures increased 3.1% and 8.1%, respectively, from 2022. The unemployment rate in the county's urban area totaled less than 3%.

In 2019, the county government reported that the county has 17 impoverished villages, and 893 households with 3682 people in poverty.

The county has a sizable tourism industry, and received about 1.36 million tourists in 2023.

Tashkurgan County hosts two international land ports: the Khunjerab Land Port at Khunjerab Pass, and the Karasu Land Port at Kulma Pass.

== Transportation ==
The county is served by Karakoram Highway, which runs through Tashkurgan. As of September 2016, China has begun building an elevated road which is expected to be completed in a few years. Tashkurgan Khunjerab Airport, which was opened in December 2022, is located in the county.

== See also ==
- Afghanistan–China border
- Chalachigu Valley
- China–Tajikistan border
- Shaksgam River
- Taghdumbash Pamir
- Tashkurgan Nature Reserve
- Yarkand River
