= Tashkurgan Khunjerab Airport =

Airport in Xinjiang, China

Tashkurgan Khunjerab Airport 塔什库尔干红其拉甫机场
- IATA: HQL; ICAO: ZWTK

Summary
- Airport type: Public / military
- Serves: Tashkurgan
- Location: Tashkurgan Tajik Autonomous County, Kashgar Prefecture, Xinjiang, China
- Opened: 23 December 2022; 3 years ago
- Elevation AMSL: 3,200 m / 10,499 ft
- Coordinates: 37.66271°N 75.29227°E

Map
- Location of airport in Xinjiang

Runways
Direction	Length		Surface
Direction	m	ft	Surface
15/33	3,800	12,467

Tashkurgan Khunjerab Airport
- Simplified Chinese: 塔什库尔干红其拉甫机场
- Traditional Chinese: 塔什庫爾幹紅其拉甫機場
Transcriptions
Standard Mandarin
- Hanyu Pinyin: Tǎshíkù'ěrgàn Hóngqílāfǔ Jīchǎng

Tashkurgan Khunjerab Airport is an airport in Tashkurgan Tajik Autonomous County, Kashgar Prefecture, Xinjiang, China. It opened on 23 December 2022. At an elevation of 3,200 m, it is Xinjiang's first high plateau airport.

Construction started on 26 April 2020 with an expected investment of CN¥1.63 billion or US$251 million. The airport was designed to handle 400 tons and 160,000 passengers annually. Test flights were started at the airport in May 2022.

The airport is seen to be part of a larger effort to develop the region commercially and to support the land route, a part of the China–Pakistan Economic Corridor, and the larger Belt and Road Initiative. It is also seen as a larger part of China's border infrastructure improvement and its 14th Five Year Plan.

== Airlines and destinations ==
Airlines	Destinations
China Southern Airlines	Kashgar, Ürümqi
