= Tashkurgan River =

River in People's Republic of China

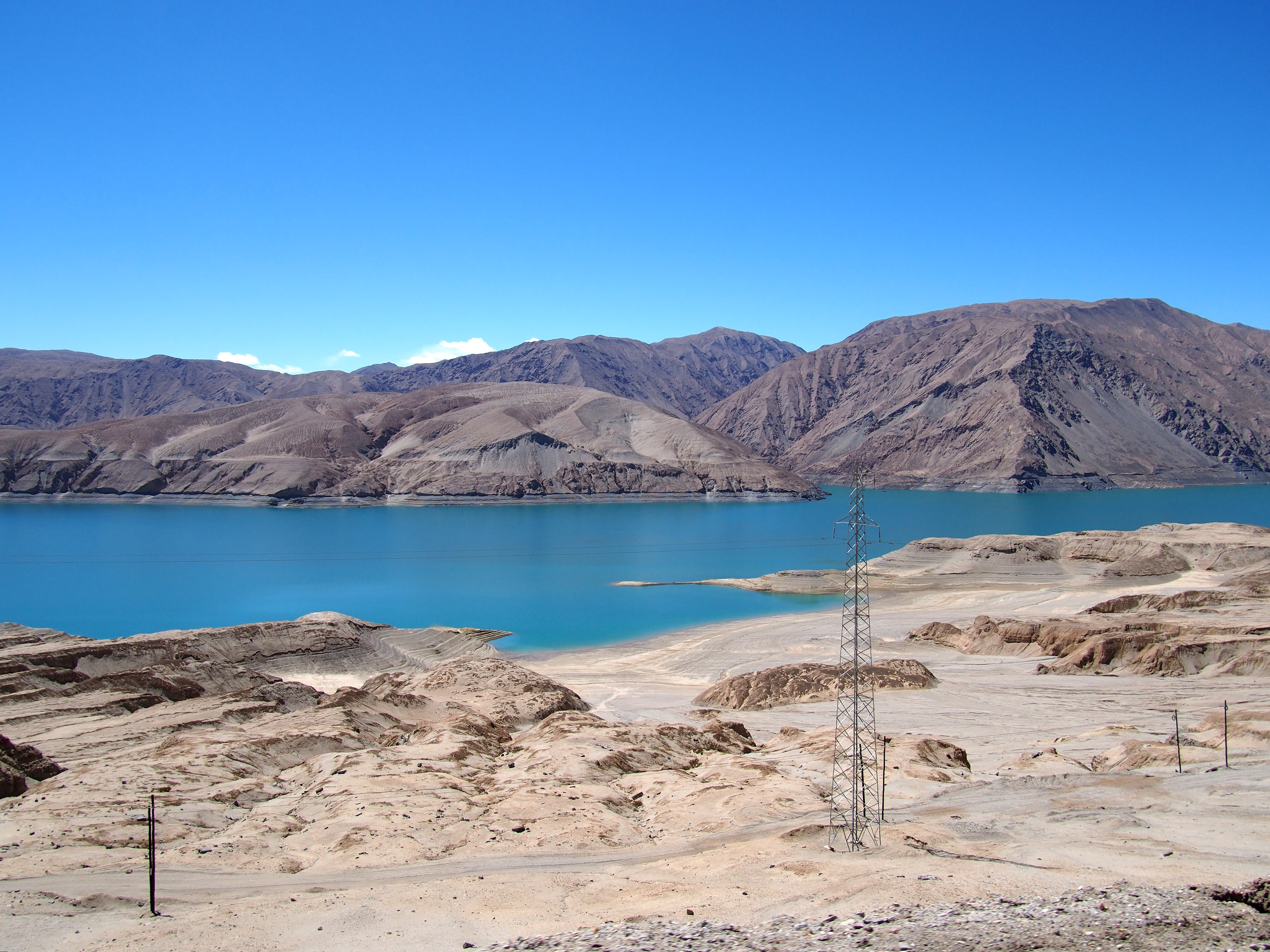

- The Mouth of Tashkurgan River

Location
- Country: China
- Province: Xinjiang

Physical characteristics
- Source: Karakoram
  - coordinates: 37.316613°N 75.412488°E
- Mouth: Yarkand River
  - coordinates: 37.8108°N 76.2009°E
- Length: 190 km (120 mi)

Basin features
- Progression: Yarkand→ Tarim→ Taitema Lake
- Landmarks: Tashkurgan Town
- Tributaries
  - left: Kalaqi Ku'er River

The Tashkurgan River (Chinese: 塔什库尔干河; pinyin Tǎshíkù'ěrgàn hé) is a river in the Xinjiang Uyghur Autonomous Region of western China. The Tashkurgan River runs through Tashkurgan Tajik Autonomous County and is one of the tributaries of the Yarkand River in the Tarim Basin.

The river is formed by the joining of several mountain streams originating in the Karakoram Range and northern Hindu Kush Mountains. It flows due north to Tashkurgan. Then, it turns right flowing through the mountains and joining the Yarkand River.
