= Tajiks in China =

Iranic ethnic group in Xinjiang, China

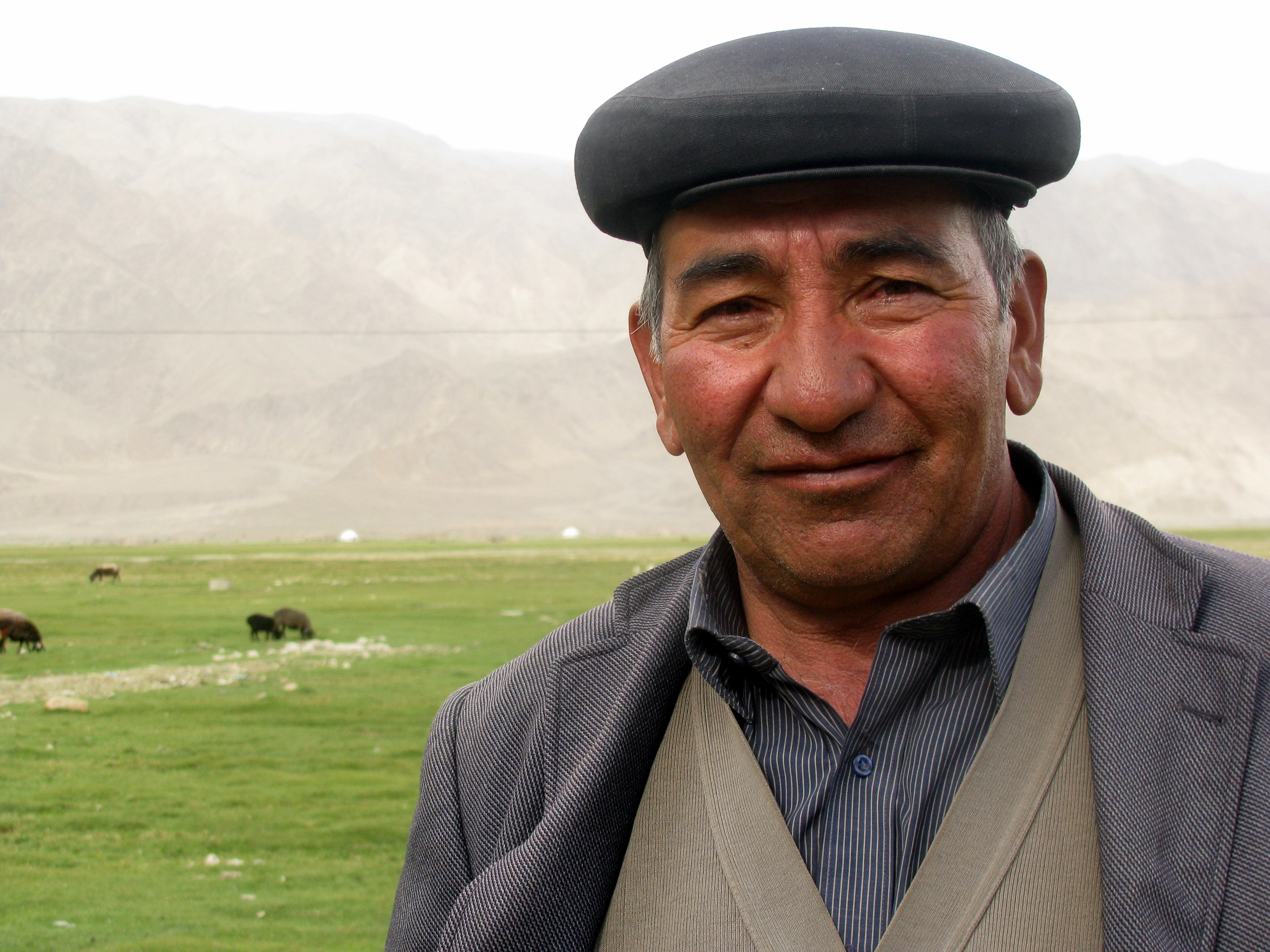
- A Tajik (Sarikoli) farmer in Tashkurgan

Regions with significant populations
- China (Xinjiang): 50,265
- Tajikistan (Gorno-Badakhshan): 1,000–2,000

Languages
- Sarikoli, Wakhi, Tor Tajik

Religion
- Shia Islam (Nizari Ismailism)

Related ethnic groups
- Other Iranian peoples

Tajiks

Chinese name
- Chinese: 塔吉克族
Transcriptions
Standard Mandarin
- Hanyu Pinyin: Tǎjíkèzú
- Wade–Giles: T'a^{3}-chi^{2}-k'ei^{4}-tsu^{2}

Sarikoli name
- Sarikoli: تۇجىك / Tujik

In China, the terms "Tajik" and "Tajik nationality" (Chinese: 塔吉克族; pinyin: Tǎjíkèzú) encompass three distinct ethnic subgroups: the Sarikolis, Wakhis, and Tor Tajiks. The Sarikolis and Wakhis are ethnic Pamiris who live in the Pamir Mountains of Tashkurgan Tajik Autonomous County, in Kashgar Prefecture, Xinjiang. The Tor Tajiks are ethnic Tajiks who reside in the village of Tor, also in Kashgar Prefecture. The Tajik nationality is one of 56 nationalities or ethnicities officially recognized by the Chinese government.

== Name ==
Their endonyms are tudʑik, sariquli, and sarikuj, with tudʑik being referred. Despite their preferred endonym, the majority of Tajiks in China are not the same ethnic group as Tajiks of Tajikistan, but ethnic Pamiris, a different Iranian ethnic group who speak the Eastern Iranian Pamiri languages.

Early 20th-century CE travelers to the region referred to the group as "Mountain Tajiks", or by the Turkic exonym "Ghalcha". Sarikoli- and Wakhi-speaking Tajiks were also referred to as "Sarikolis" and "Wakhis", respectively.

== History ==
=== Early history ===
The Pamiri peoples are believed to be the descendants of the Saka-Scythians who inhabited modern-day Xinjiang. The Pamiri languages are descended from various Scythian languages.

The town of Tashkurgan was the capital of the Sarikol Kingdom (色勒庫爾) in the Pamir Mountains.

Xinjiang and its eastern Iranian-speaking peoples underwent gradual Turkification following the region's conquests and settlements by Turkic peoples such as the Uyghurs and Qarakhanids. By the Mongol period, most of these eastern Iranian peoples had assimilated into the Turkic community. The Tajiks claim to be descended from the remaining eastern Iranians who still resided in the Pamir Mountains of Xinjiang. This claim is supported by medieval Chinese literature, documents and modern archaeological evidence.

=== Conversion to Nizari Ismailism ===
According to oral tradition, Nasir Khusraw led a mission to the region with four of his disciples: Sayyid Hassan Zarrabi, Sayyid Surab Wali, Sayyid Jalal Bukhari, and Jahan Malikshah. Khusraw purportedly told some of his disciples to settle down in the area to continue to aid and preach to the local converts about Ismailism. Many contemporary pirs (holy men) claim descent from these early disciples.

=== Qing dynasty ===
The Tajiks were administered by the Qing under a system of Begs (chiefs) like the rest of Xinjiang. The Qing claimed suzerainty over the Taghdumbash Pamir in the southwest of Xinjiang, but permitted the Mir of Hunza to administer the region in return for their tributes. The Hunzas were tributaries and allies to Qing China, acknowledging China as suzerain from 1761 onward.

The Tajiks practiced slavery, selling some of their own as a punishment. Submissive slaves were given wives and settled with the Tajiks. They were considered property and could be sold anytime. Their slaves came from numerous sources; for example, Sunni captives such as the Kyrgyz were enslaved in retaliation for Kyrgyz slave raids against the Tajiks. Sunni slaves were also brought from Hunza (also known as Khujund), Gilgit, and Chitral. Slaves from Chitral and Hunza passed through the Pamir Mountains on their way to Bukhara, present-day Uzbekistan. The Tajiks were labelled "Rafidites" by the Sunnis, who did not consider them Muslims as enslaving fellow Muslims is contrary to Sharia law.

There were hundreds of slaves sold by Tajiks. Most foreign slaves in Xinjiang were Tajiks; they were referred to by the Sunni Muslim Turkic Uyghurs as "Ghalcha". Tajiks made up the majority of slave trafficked and sold in Xinjiang to the Sunni Muslim Turkic inhabitants and they were seen as foreigners and strangers. Serfs were treated in a "wretched" manner.

Following Ya'qub Beg's conquest of Yettishar, in 1870 he ordered the en masse deportation of all Sarikolis to Kashgar. They remained there for 2 years before they were allowed to return to the Tashkurgan region.

An anti-Russian uproar broke out when Russian customs officials – three Cossacks and a Russian courier – invited local Uyghur prostitutes to a party in January 1902 in Kashgar. This caused a massive brawl between several Russians and local Uyghurs, the latter acting on the pretense of protecting Muslim women. Qing officials quickly dispersed the crowd and sought to end tensions immediately to prevent the Russians from building up a pretext to invade Xinjiang.

After the riot, the Russians sent troops to Tashkurghan and demanded that local postal services be placed under Russian supervision. The Russians attempted to negotiate with the Begs of Tashkurgan, but the Begs feared that the Russians would not stop at their demands of the postal services and would aim to seize the entire area from the Qing. Tashkurgan officials even went as far as to petition the Amban of Yarkand to evacuate the local population to Yarkand so they could avoid being harassed by the Russians.

=== Republic of China ===
In the mid-1940s around 9,000 Tajiks lived in Xinjiang, while others moved to other Central Asian countries and provinces of China. During the Ili Rebellion from 1944 to 1949, Uyghur forces butchered the livestock of the Tajiks as they advanced south. Uyghur rebels who were backed by the Soviets destroyed Tajik crops and acted violently against Tajiks and Kyrgyz.

== Distribution ==
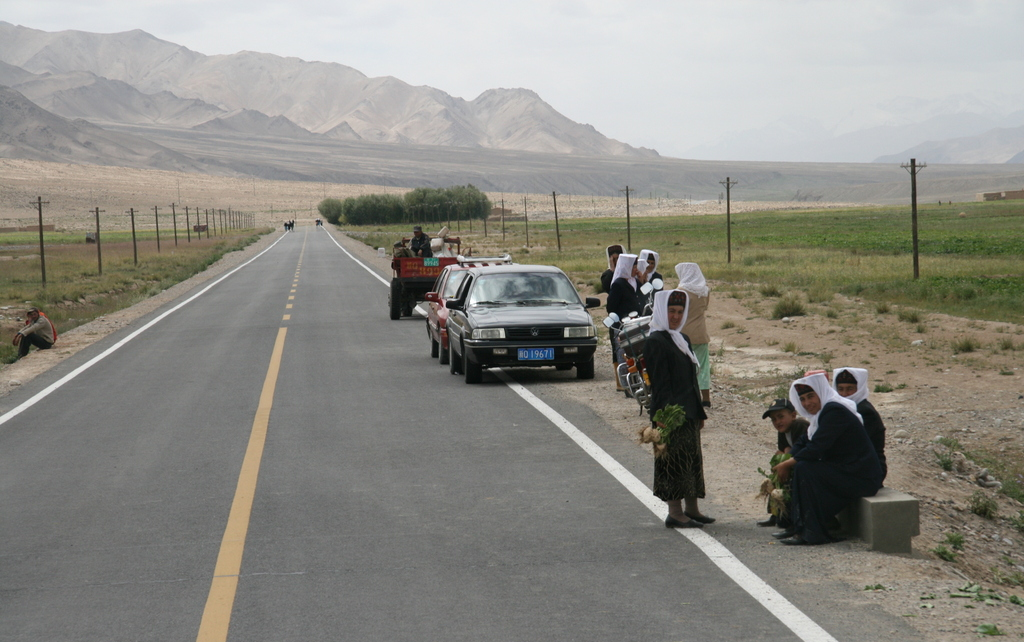
Tajik women on the Karakoram Highway from Tashkurgan to Khunjerab Pass

The population of Tajiks in Xinjiang numbered 41,028 in 2000 and 50,265 in 2015. Sixty percent of the Tajik population reside in Tashkurgan Tajik Autonomous County. As of 2016, more than 4,000 Tajiks lived in nearby Poskam County (Zepu). Some Tajiks live in Kokyar (Kekeya) and Kargilik County (Yecheng). Tar Township in Akto County, Kizilsu Kyrgyz Autonomous Prefecture, is a Tajik township.

== Language ==
The languages of the Tajiks have no official written form. The vast majority speak the Sarikoli language, which has been heavily influenced by Chinese, Uyghur, and Wakhi. A minority speak the Wakhi language. Sarikoli and Wakhi are Iranian languages, commonly classified in the Pamir or Eastern Iranian areal groups. The Tor Tajiks speak a Karluk language intermediate between Uyghur and Uzbek. While intermarriages are common between Sarikolis and Wakhis, Tor Tajiks generally do not intermarry with the other two subgroups of the Tajik nationality.

== Religion ==
The Tajiks are adherents of the Nizari Ismaili sect of Shia Islam and are still a little isolated from the rest of the worldwide Ismaili community, though their communication with other Pamiri (Ismaili) peoples has never stopped. The Chinese authorities allow a few Ismaili religious buildings to function in Tashkurgan, the clerics of whom are appointed by the secular Chinese authorities. Restrictions by the Chinese government bar foreign Ismaili preachers from openly working among the Tajiks. The religious leader of the Nizari Ismaili sect, the Aga Khan, was once barred from conducting business with Ismailis in China.

From 2 to 4 April 2012, Aga Khan IV paid an official visit to Ürümqi, the capital of Xinjiang, at the invitation of the then governor of Xinjiang, Nur Bekri. Delegations of the Aga Khan Development Network (AKDN) and the Xinjiang government met to discuss future cooperation. Bekri agreed to collaborate in several thematic areas of mutual interest, including poverty alleviation, education, investment in tourism, and financial services. The Aga Khan IV had last visited China in 1981.

Tajiks have been caught up in the China's crackdown on Muslims that has taken place since 2017, despite the fact that they have tended to be not politically active. Only a single mosque is allowed to operate in Tashkurgan Tajik Autonomous County, and children under 18 are not permitted to attend it.

== Culture ==
=== Family life ===
At least three generations of relatives live under the same household in a traditional Tajik family. Each family has a familial hierarchy determined by a family member's age and sex, with the senior male acting as the head of the family. The responsibilities of the men tend to be providing for the family and looking after the children and elderly. The women's responsibilities are to raise the children, attend to household duties, and care for the elderly. The senior male is in charge of managing the entire household and the family's wealth through consulting with the rest of the men in the house. The young men are discouraged from seeking an independent life outside the household unless they receive collective consent from the family. Failure to do so can forfeit them from inheritance.

=== Rites of passage and life cycles ===
Marriages are usually arranged by the parents of the prospective groom and bride from the asking of the daughter's hand up to the wedding. The families of the couple also decide on the dowry amount, plan the engagements and wedding dates, and choose who can attend. About three days before the wedding, the families come together and initiate a feast for the people in the area who have lost relatives in the last year or so. These people then approve of the celebration by tapping on a hand drum. Funerals are conducted by first doing the Islamic rites of cleansing the body and praying for the deceased. This is followed by the family who burn incense and close any room or ceiling windows as this is believed to purify the path for the deceased. Every family member is expected to attend the funeral or make up for it with a visit to the family. For forty days after the burial, the closest relatives of the deceased will begin to abstain from personal comforts like by keeping their hair unkempt or uncut. On the last day, friends and family come together to bathe and clean the mourners and to convince them to return to their daily lives.

=== Festivals and rituals ===
The two main celebrations of the Tajiks are Nowruz (the Persian New Year; ched chader in Sarikoli, meaning "cleaning the house") and the Pilik festival. Right before Nowruz begins, families rigorously clean their homes and sprinkle the inner walls with putuk (wheat flour) to wish for a successful year. Each household bakes a cake for the occasion to share with guests. The guests are welcomed on the doorstep by dusting some putuk on their right shoulder. Meanwhile, Pilik is dedicated to commemorating the dead. Families light candles and pray for the souls of the dead while circling the light and pulling the flame towards their face. This ritual lasts two days. On the first day, families light candles inside the house. On the second day, they visit the local cemetery and light a candle for each deceased relative and place it on their graves.

Seasonal rituals such as Zuwur zoht (irrigation) and Teghm zuwost (seed sowing) used to be commonplace but presently a pir (a local religious master) or khalifa (a religious functionary who is trained under a pir) blesses the agricultural implements in the fields by reciting verses from the Quran.

=== Livelihood ===
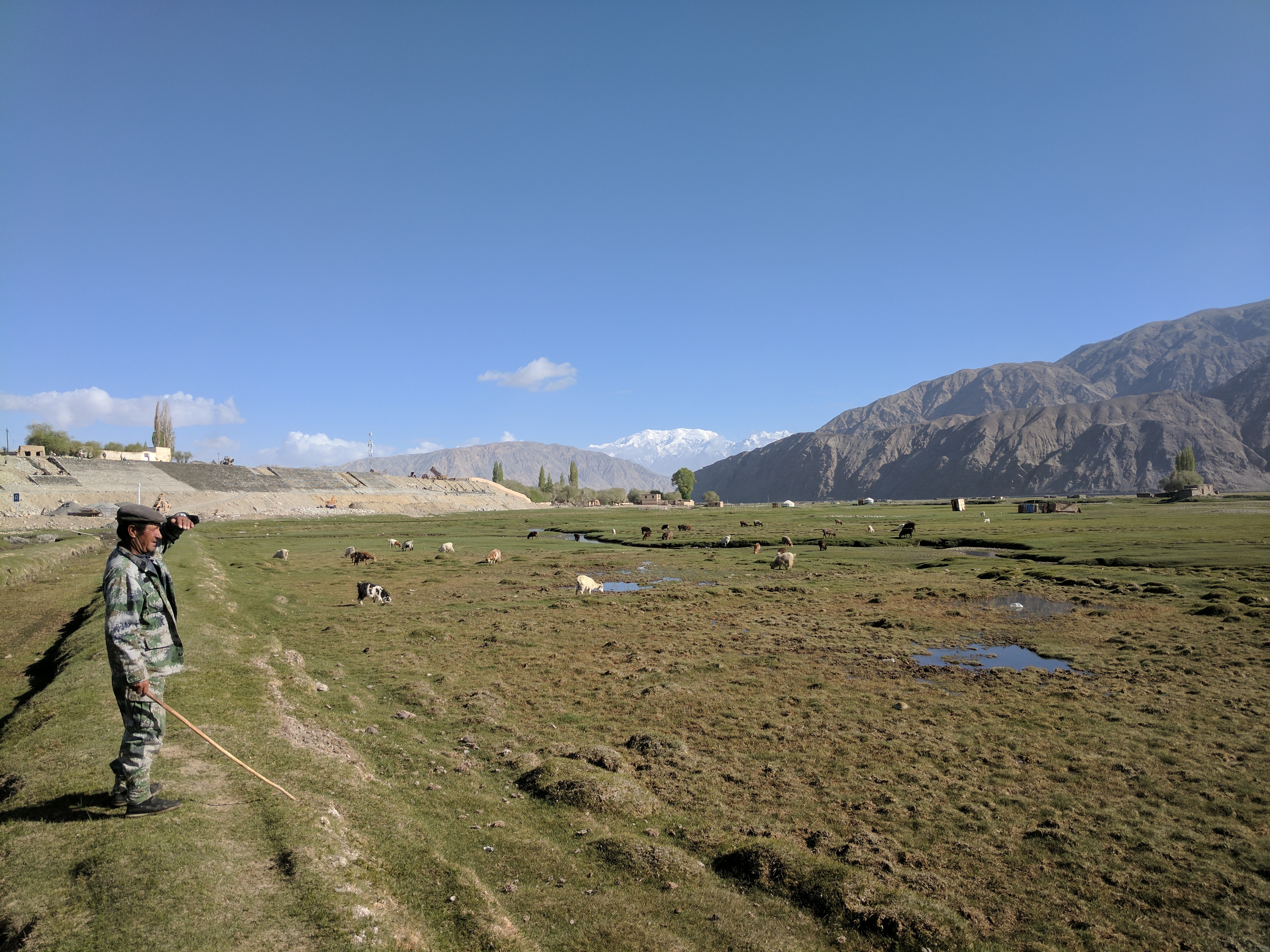
A Tajik herder in Tashkurgan

Because of the harsh and scarce environment in which the locals live in, Tajiks mostly rely on cultivating whatever arable land is available and engage in small-scale animal husbandry. Other types of subsistence also include selling traditional embroidery, clothes, hats, and other arts and crafts. However, this is only a seasonal operation. There are also a few governmental wages available but salaried jobs are few and the demand is very high.

== Tor Tajiks ==
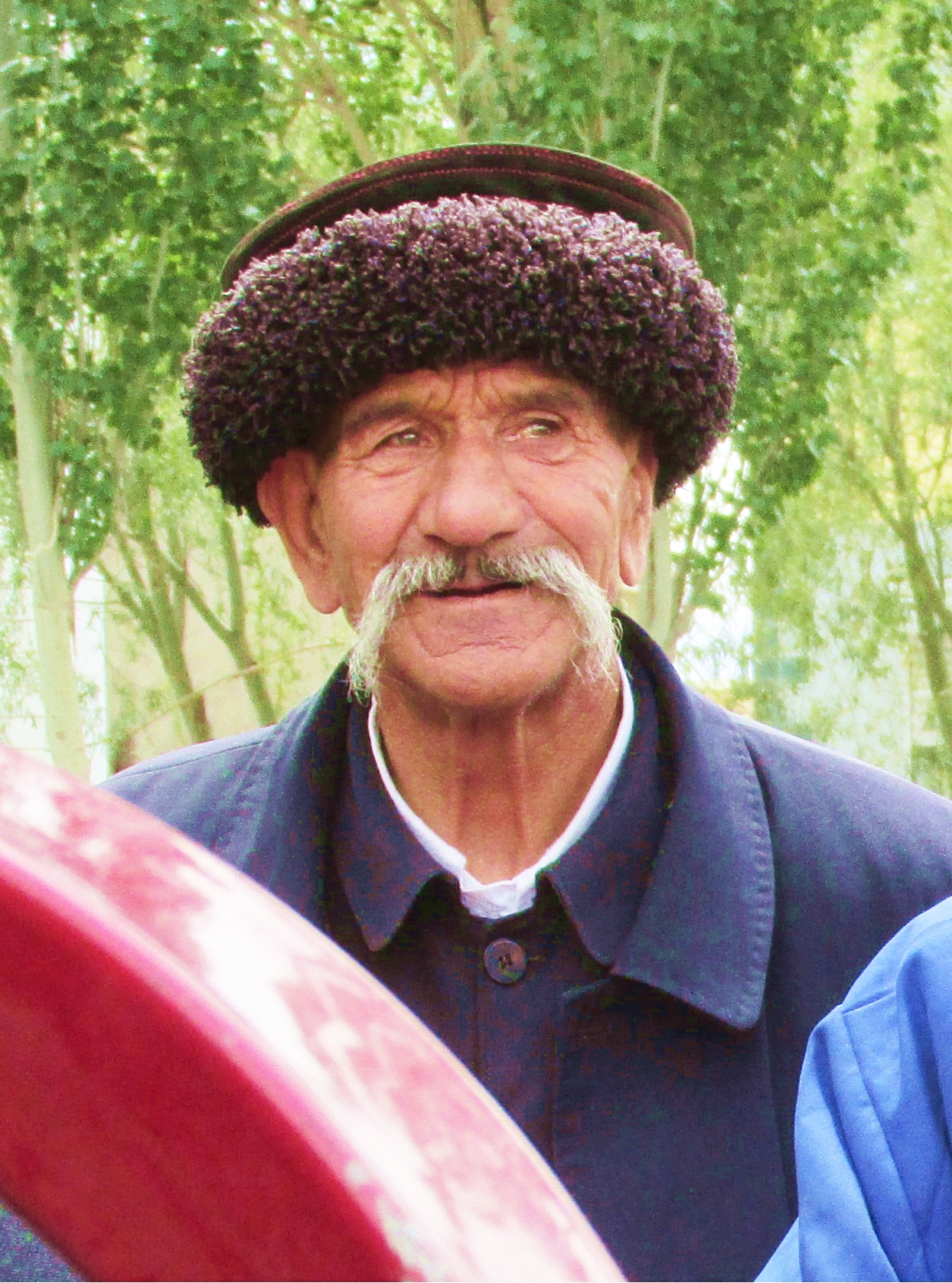
A Tor Tajik man in traditional attire

Tor Tajiks are ethnic Tajiks indigenous to the village of Tor in Xinjiang. The Chinese government officially regards them as members of the "Tajik nationality", along with the non-Tajik, Sarikoli- or Wakhi-speaking Pamiris of Tashkurgan County. Although they are Iranic Tajiks and follow Tajik customs, they speak a Turkic language intermediate between Uyghur and Uzbek. While intermarriages are common between Sarikolis and Wakhis, Tor Tajiks generally do not intermarry with the other two subgroups of the Tajik nationality.

== Notable people ==
- Maimati Rouzi (1935–1973), poet
- Wu Tianyi (born 1935), medical scientist, member of the Chinese Academy of Engineering
- Maidli Khan (born 1941), poet and writer
- Nabrasha Hugahon (born 1964), politician, member of the 12th National People's Congress
- Daimick Divana (born 1977), politician
- Razini Bayika (1979–2021), soldier and politician, member of the 13th National People's Congress
