= Sarikoli language =

Iranian language spoken in China and Pakistan

Sarikoli
- Tashkorghani
- تۇجىك زىڤ / سەرىقۇلى زىڤ; Tujik ziv / Sarikhuli ziv; Тоҷик зив / Сариқоли зив
- Native to: China, Pakistan
- Region: Pamir Mountains (Tashkurgan, China, and Chitral, Pakistan)
- Ethnicity: Sarikolis
- Native speakers: (16,000 cited 2000)
- Language family: Indo-European: Indo-Iranian; Iranian; Southeastern; Shughni-Yazghulami-Munji; Shughni-Yazghulami; Shughni-Sarikoli; Sarikoli
- Writing system: Uyghur alphabet (unofficial)

Language codes
- ISO 639-3: srh
- Glottolog: sari1246
- ELP: Sarikoli
- Linguasphere: 58-ABD-eb
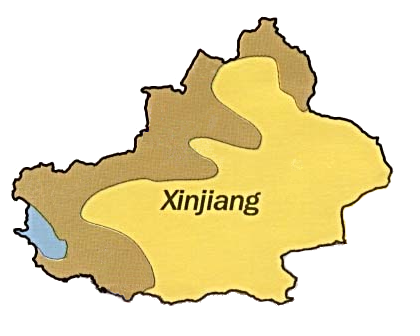
- Distribution of the Sarikoli language (blue) in Xinjiang

The Sarikoli language (also Sariqoli, Selekur, Sarikul, Sariqul, Sariköli) is a member of the Pamir subgroup of the Southeastern Iranian languages spoken by the Pamiris in Xinjiang, China and Chitral, Pakistan. It is officially referred to as "the Tajik language" in China, although it is an Eastern Iranian language and thus different from Tajik spoken in Tajikistan, which is a variety of Persian, a Western Iranian language. The language is linguistically closely related to Shughni and Yazghulami.

== Nomenclature ==
Sarikoli is officially referred to as Tajik (Chinese: 塔吉克语, Tǎjíkèyǔ) in China. Sarikoli is only distantly related to Tajik, a variety of Persian, as Sarikoli belongs to the Eastern Iranian branch and is more closely related to the other Pamir languages of Badakhshan, whereas Persian belongs to the Western Iranian branch, with the Tajik variety of Persian being spoken in Tajikistan and Uzbekistan. It is also referred to as Tashkorghani, after the ancient capital of the Sarikoli kingdom—now the Tashkurgan (or Taxkorgan) Tajik Autonomous County in Xinjiang, China. However, the usage of the term Tashkorghani is not widespread among scholars.

The earliest written accounts in English are from the 1870s which generally use the name Sarikoli to refer to the language, but some written accounts since that time may use a different pronunciation derived from transcribing Chinese phonetics of the term into English as "Selekur(i)". Modern Chinese researchers often mention Sarikoli and Tajik names in their papers.

== Distribution of speakers ==
The number of speakers is around 16,000 (as of 2000), most of whom reside in the Tashkurgan Tajik Autonomous County in Southern Xinjiang, China, and the Upper Chitral District of Pakistan, specifically the Broghil Valley. The Chinese name for the Sarikoli language, as well as the usage of Sarikol as a toponym, is Sàléikuòlèyǔ (萨雷阔勒语). Speakers in China typically use Chinese and Uyghur to communicate with people of other ethnic groups in the area.

== Writing system ==
The language has no official written form. Linguist Gao Erqiang, publishing in China, used IPA to transcribe the sounds of Sarikoli in his book and dictionary, while Tatiana N. Pakhalina, publishing in Russia, used an alphabet similar to that of the Wakhi language in hers. The majority of Sarikoli-speakers attend schools using Uyghur as the medium of instruction.

=== Uyghur alphabet ===
In recent years, Sarikoli speakers in China have used a modified version of the Uyghur alphabet (itself a modified version of the Persian alphabet) to spell out their language.

Sarikoli Alphabet
No.	Letter	IPA	Latin Eq.	No.	Letter	IPA	Latin Eq.
1	ئا	[ɔ]	O o	20	غ	[ʁ]	Gh gh
2	ئە	[ɑ]/[ɛ]	A a	21	ݝ	[ɣ]	Gc gc
3	ب	[b]	B b	22	ف	[f]	F f
4	پ	[p]	P p	23	ڤ	[v]	V v
5	ت	[t]	T t	24	ق	[q]	Kh kh
6	ث	[θ]	Ss ss	25	ك	[k]/[c]	K k
7	ج	[d͡ʑ]	J j	26	گ	[ɡ]/[ɟ]	G g
8	چ	[t͡ɕ]	Q q	27	ڭ	[ŋ]	Ng ng
9	خ	[χ]	H h	28	ل	[l]	L l
10	ݗ	[x]	C c	29	م	[m]	M m
11	څ	[t͡s]	Ts ts	30	ن	[n]	N n
12	ځ	[d͡z]	Dz dz	31	ھ	[h]	Hy hy
13	د	[d]	D d	32	ئۇ	[u]	U u
14	ذ	[ð]	Zz zz	33	ئۈ	[ɯ]	Ü ü
15	ر	[r]	R r	34	ۋ	[w]	W w
16	ز	[z]	Z z	35	ئې	[e]	E e
17	ژ	[ʑ]	Zy zy	36	ئى	[i]	I i
18	س	[s]	S s	37	ي	[j]	Y y
19	ش	[ɕ]	X x				

Letter	Latin Eq.
ئاي	Oi oi
ئاۋ	Ou ou
ئېي	Ei ei
ئېۋ	Eu eu
ئۇي	Ui ui
ئۈي	Üi üi
ئۈۋ	Üu üu
ئىۋ	Iu iu

=== Latin alphabet variants ===
==== Gao Erqiang Sarikoli Latin alphabet ====
In 1958, linguist Gao Erqiang studied Sarikoli in collaboration with Tajik linguists, using 37 symbols from the International Phonetic Alphabet for the transcription of the language. In the 1996 Sarikoli–Han dictionary, Gao uses an alphabet of 26 letters and 8 digraphs based on Pinyin.

Sarikoli alphabet (Gao 1996)
Uppercase	A	B	C	D	DZ	E	F	G	GC	GH	H	HY	I	J	K	KH	L	M
Lowercase	a	b	c	d	dz	e	f	g	gc	gh	h	hy	i	j	k	kh	l	m
Pronunciation	a	b	x	d	d͡z	e	f	ɡ	ɣ	ʁ	χ	h	i	d͡ʒ	k	q	l	m
Uppercase	N	O	P	Q	R	S	SS	T	TS	U	Ü	V	W	X	Y	Z	ZY	ZZ
Lowercase	n	o	p	q	r	s	ss	t	ts	u	ü	v	w	x	y	z	zy	zz
Pronunciation	n	o	p	t͡ʃ	r	s	θ	t	t͡s	u	ɯ	v	w	ʃ	j	z	ʒ	ð

==== Pakhalina Sarikoli Latin alphabet ====
In the Sarikoli Latin alphabet version by linguist Tatiana N. Pakhalina, the sounds are represented by these letters:

Letter	А а	B b	C c	Č č	D d	δ δ	E e	Ɛ ε	Ə ə	F f	G g	Ɣ ɣ	Ɣ̆ ɣ̆	I i	Ʒ ʒ	J̌ ǰ	K k	L l	М м
IPA	[a]	[b]	[t͡s]	[ʈ͡ʂ]	[d]	[ð]	[e]	[ɛ]	[ə]	[f]	[ɡ]	[ʁ]	[ɣ]	[i]	[d͡z]	[ɖ͡ʐ]	[k]	[l]	[m]
Letter	N n	O o	P p	Q q	R r	S s	Š š	T t	ϑ ϑ	U u	Ü ü	V v	W w	Х х	Х̌ х̌	У у	Z z	Ž ž	Ы ы
IPA	[n]	[o]	[p]	[q]	[r]	[s]	[ʂ]	[t]	[θ]	[u]	[uː]	[v]	[w]	[χ]	[x]	[j]	[z]	[ʐ]	[ɯ]

== Phonology ==
=== Vowels ===
	Front	Central	Back	
High	i ⟨i⟩		ɯ ⟨ы⟩	u ⟨u⟩
Near-high	i ⟨i⟩		ʊ ⟨ů⟩	
High-mid	e ⟨e⟩	ə ⟨ə⟩	o ⟨o⟩	
Low-mid	ɛ ⟨ɛ⟩	ə ⟨ə⟩	(ɔ) ⟨o⟩	
Low		a ⟨a⟩		

- /o/ may also be heard as [ɔ, ʌ].

Sarikoli vowel ɔ/o is an allophone with Uyghur vowel a. Sarikoli vowel a is an allophone with Uyghur vowel æ. Sarikoli vowels have undergone the same Eastern Iranian chain shift as Tajik Persian, Persian-influenced Uzbek, and other Eastern Iranian Pamir languages. The vowel chain shift looks like the following:

- [a] → [a]/[æ]
- [aː] → [ɔ]
- [o] → [u]
- [u] → [ɵ]/[y]

Sarikoli vowels as used in Russian works (IPA values in brackets):

a [a], e [e], ɛy [ɛi̯] (dialectal æy or ay [æi̯ / ai̯]), ɛw [ɛu̯] (dialectal æw or aw [æu̯ /au̯]), ə [ə], i [i], o [o / ɔ], u [u], ы [ɯ] (dialectal ů [ʊ]). In some dialects also long variants of those vowels can appear: ā, ē, ī, ō, ū, ы̄, ǝ̄. (citation?)

=== Consonants ===
Sarikoli has 30 consonants:

Sarikoli consonants according to Russian Iranologist transcription (IPA values in slashes): p /p/, b /b/, t /t/, d /d/, k /k ~ c/, g /ɡ ~ ɟ/, q /q/, c /ts/, ʒ /dz/, č /tɕ/, ǰ /dʑ/, s /s/, z /z/, x̌ /x/, γ̌ /ɣ/, f /f/, v /v/, θ /θ/, δ /ð/, x /χ/, γ /ʁ/, š /ɕ/, ž /ʑ/, h /h/, w /w/, y /j/, m /m/, n /n, ŋ/, l /l/, r /r/

		Labial	Dental	Alveolar	Palatal	Velar	Uvular	Glottal
Nasal		m ⟨m⟩		n ⟨n⟩		(ŋ) ⟨n⟩		
Plosive	voiceless	p ⟨p⟩		t ⟨t⟩	k ~ c ⟨k⟩		q ⟨q⟩	
Plosive	voiced	b ⟨b⟩		d ⟨d⟩	ɡ ~ ɟ ⟨g⟩			
Affricate	voiceless			ts ⟨c⟩	tɕ ⟨č⟩			
Affricate	voiced			dz ⟨ʒ⟩	dʑ ⟨ǰ⟩			
Fricative	voiceless	f ⟨f⟩	θ ⟨θ⟩	s ⟨s⟩	ɕ ⟨š⟩	x ⟨x̌⟩	χ ⟨x⟩	h ⟨h⟩
Fricative	voiced	v ⟨v⟩	ð ⟨δ⟩	z ⟨z⟩	ʑ ⟨ž⟩	ɣ ⟨γ̌⟩	ʁ ⟨γ⟩	
Approximant		w ⟨w⟩		l ⟨l⟩	j ⟨y⟩			
Rhotic				r ⟨r⟩				

=== Stress ===
Most words receive stress on the last syllable; however, a minority receive stress on their first syllable. Also, several noun declensions and verb inflections regularly place stress on their first syllable, including the imperative and interrogative.

== Vocabulary ==
Although to a large extent the Sarikoli lexicon is quite close to those of other Eastern Iranian languages, there are a large number of words unique to Sarikoli and the closely related Shughni that are not found in other Eastern Iranian languages such as Wakhi, Pashto or Avestan.

Lexical comparison of eight Iranian languages together with an English translation
English gloss	Persian (Iranian)	Persian (Tajik)	Wakhi	Pashto	Shughni	Sarikoli	Ossetic	Avestan
one	jæk (یک)	jak (‍як)	ji	jaw (يو)	jiw	iw	iw (иу)	aēuua-
meat	ɡuʃt (گوشت)	ɡuʃt (гушт)	ɡuʂt	ɣwaxa, ɣwaʂa (غوښه)	ɡuːxt	ɡɯxt	zizä (дзидза)	gao- (N. gāuš)
son	pesær (پسر)	pisar (писар)	putr	zoi (زوی)	puts	pɯts	fɪ̈rt (фырт)	puθra-
fire	ɒteʃ (آتش)	otaʃ (оташ)	rɯχniɡ	or (اور)	joːts	juts	ärt (арт)	ātar-
water	ɒb (اب)	ob (об)	jupk	obə (اوبه)	xats	xats	don (дон)	ap-
hand	dæst (دست)	dast (даѕт)	ðast	lɑs (لاس)	ðust	ðɯst	kʼuχ (къух)	zasta-
foot	pɒ (پا)	po (по)	pɯð	pxa, pʂa (پښه)	poːð	peð	fäd (фад)	paδa-, pāδa-
tooth	dændɒn (دندان)	dandon (дандон)	ðɯnðɯk	ɣɑx, ɣɑʂ (غاښ)	ðinðʉn	ðanðun	dəndäg (дӕндаг)	daṇtān-
eye	tʃæʃm (چشم)	tʃaʃm (чашм)	tʂəʐm	stərɡa (سترګه)	tsem	tsem	səʃt (цæст)	dōiθra-; caṣ̌man-
horse	æsb (اسب)	asp (асп)	jaʃ	ɑs (آس)	voːrdʒ	vurdʒ	bəχ (бӕх)	aspa-
cloud	æbr (ابر)	abr (абр)	mur	urjadz (اوريځ)	abri	varm	əvräʁ (æврагъ) / miʁ (мигъ)	abda-; aβra-, aβrā-; maēγa-
wheat	ɡændom (گندم)	ɡandum (гандум)	ɣɯdim	ɣanam (غنم)	ʒindam	ʒandam	mənəw (мæнæу)	gaṇtuma-
many	besjɒr (بسيار)	bisjor (бисёр)	təqi	ɖer, pura (ډېر، پوره)	bisjoːr	pɯr	fyr (фыр)	paoiri-
high	bolænd (بلند)	baland (баланд)	bɯland	lwaɻ (لوړ)	biland	bɯland	bərʒond (бӕрзoнд)	bərəzaṇt-
far	dur (دور)	dur (дур)	ðir	ləre (لرې)	ðar	ðar	därd (дард)	dūra-
good	χub (خوب)	χub (хуб)	baf	xə, ʂə (ښه)	χub	tʃardʒ	χorʒ (хорз)	vaŋha-
small	kutʃik (کوچک))	χurd (хурд)	dzəqlai	ləɡ, ləʐ (لږ)	dzul	dzɯl	gɪ̈ssɪ̈ɫ (гыццыл)	kasu-
to say	ɡoft (گفت)	ɡuft (гуфт)	xənak	wajəl (ويل)	lʉvd	levd	zurɪ̈n (дзурын)	vac-; aoj-; mrū-; saŋh-
to do	kærd (کرد)	kard (кард)	tsərak	kawəl (کول)	tʃiːd	tʃeiɡ	kənɪ̈n (кæнын)	kar-
to see	did (ديد)	did (дид)	wiŋɡ	winəm (وينم)	wiːnt	wand	wɪ̈nɪ̈n (уынын)	dī-, viŋ-

== Sample text ==
The following text is a paragraph from Gao Erqiang's "Tajik-Chinese Dictionary" (1996), talking about the significance of the development of a writing system for the language of Tajiks of Xinjiang, both in Chinese and Sarikoli. The Sarikoli text is written in the "Pinyin" developed by Gao Erqiang for use in the dictionary. Below, the text is also transcribed in an equivalent Persian alphabet.

Latin script	Awal birinqi masala qi ter gap kayan. Tujik milat hüyan ziv yost. Yad ziv optunum noya ar doira khulanmix soud. Janubi Xinjongan Yurkond, Puskom, KHarghalegh, Pixan khatorlekh juiefan wi Tujik heil uhxox na yozzin, Di juienj Tujik heil asos az jat hü ziv khulanmix kayin, Hü milatan wi ziv khulanmix qeig wa a wi tarakhi qeig Asosi KHonün zzujenj hyukhukh. Agar i milatan ghov ziv vid, kitubi ziv tsa na vid, di rang zivan wi rafond wa tarakhiyot qaklimari diqur hird. M dos qeig levd alo k yü milat Asosi KHonün zzujenj az hyukhukh tulukh bahyrimand na sezzjenj soud. Yizekh levjenj a ziv hotirlamix qeigiquz balgü, yani i mi khati münosibatlig vezzjenj pinyin sestimo qi qer wezzd khati hyusil sezzjenj, dian hyiq rang sir nist, Pinyin loyayan wi tüzülüx mofekh tsa soud, hyiq rang alukat mas peidu na soud. Vizekhan at ziv mazzon vezzjenj zidiyat mas ubiktip hyolda i taraf set khati ter sawiya khati birligir yozzd. Müstakhil tarakhi qogcjenj i zivan Kyamon wiri mos yetiquz i yizekh vid karak. Ilim wa rafond az nuhto zoct alo yad douliri uighun qer.
Persian alphabet	ئەۋەل بىرىنچى مەسەلە چى تېر گەپ كەيەن. تۇجىك مىلەت خۈيەن زىڤ ياست. يەد زىڤ ئاپتۇنۇم نايە ئەر دايرە قۇلانمىش ساۋد. جەنۇبى شىنجاڭەن يۇركاند، پۇسكام، قەرغەلېغ، پىشان قەتارلېق جۇيېفەن ۋى تۇجىك خېيل ئۇخشاش نە ياذىن، دى جۇيېنج تۇجىك خېيل ئەساس ئەز جەت خۈ زىڤ قۇلەنمىش كەيىن، خۈ مىلەتەن ۋى زىڤ قۇلەنمىش چېيگ ۋە ئە ۋى تەرەقى چېيگ ئەساسى قانۈن ذۇجېنج ھۇقۇق. ئەگەر ئى مىلەتەن غاڤ زىڤ ڤىد، كىتۇبى زىڤ څە نە ڤىد، دى رەڭ زىڤەن ۋى رەفاند ۋە تەرەقىيات چەكلىمەرى دىچۇر خىرد. مداس چېيگ لېڤد ئەلا كيۈ مىلەت ئەساسى قانۈن ذۇجېنج ئەز ھۇقۇق تۇلۇق بەھرىمەند نە سېذجېنج ساۋد. يىزېق لېڤجېنج ئە زىڤ خاتىرلەمىش چېيگىچۇز بەلگۈ، يەنى ئى مى قەتى مۈناسىبەتلىگ ڤەذجېنج «پىن‌يىن» سېستىما چى چېر ۋەذد قەتى ھۇسىل سېذجېنج، دىەن ھىچ رەڭ سىر نىست، «پىن‌يىن» لايەيەن ۋى تۈزۈلۈش مافېق څە ساۋد، ھىچ رەڭ ئەلۇكەت مەس پېيدۇ نە ساۋد. ڤىزېقەن ئەت زىڤ مەذان ڤەذجېنج زىدىيەت مەس ئۇبىكتىپ ھالدە ئى تەرەف سېت قەتى تېر سەۋىيە قەتى بىرلىگىر یاذد. مۈستەقىل تەرەقى چاݝجېنج ئى زىڤەن كيەمان ۋىرى ماس يېتىچۇز ڤىد كەرەك. ئىلىم ۋە رەفاند ئەز نۇختا زاݗت ئەلا يەد داۋلىرى ئۇيغۇن چېر.
Chinese	先说第一个问题。塔吉克族有自己的语言。这种语言在自 治县通用,是无法用其他语言代替的。和南疆莎车、泽普、叶 城等地的塔吉克人不同,这里很多塔吉克人只使用或基本上 使用自己语言。使用和发展本民族语言是宪法赋予的权利。如果一个民族只有口头语而没有书面语,这个语言的使用和 发展实际上就受到限制,也就不能合理享受宪法给予的权 利。文字就是记录语言的符号,用的是相关的一套拼音系 统,其中没有什么神秘,拼音方案设计周到也不会产生繁 难。文和语之问可能具有的矛盾将会通过客观而明智的处理 达到很大程度上的一致。一个独立发展的语言总要有和他相适应的文字。这从学术上或实用上说是理所当然的。
English	Let's talk about the first question first. The Tajiks have their own language. This language is commonly used in the autonomous county and cannot be replaced by other languages. Unlike the Tajiks in Yarkant, Poskam, Kargilik and other places in southern Xinjiang, many Tajiks here exclusively or largely exclusively use their own language. The use and development of the ethnic language is a right conferred by the constitution. If an ethnicity only has a spoken language but no written language, the use and development of this language will actually be restricted, and it will not be able to reasonably enjoy the rights granted by the constitution. Writing is a set of symbols that record language, and a related pinyin system is used. There is nothing mysterious about it, and a well-designed pinyin scheme will not cause any complications. Possible contradictions between text and language will be treated objectively and wisely to achieve a large degree of consistency. A language that develops independently must have a set of characters that are suitable for it. This is a matter of course from an academic or practical point of view.
