= Tashkurgan =

Town in Xinjiang, China

Tashkurgan: 塔什库尔干镇 (Chinese); تاشقورغان بازىرى (Uyghur); تاشقۈرغان بۇزۇر (Sarikoli); Taxkorgan, Sarikol, Shitoucheng
- Town
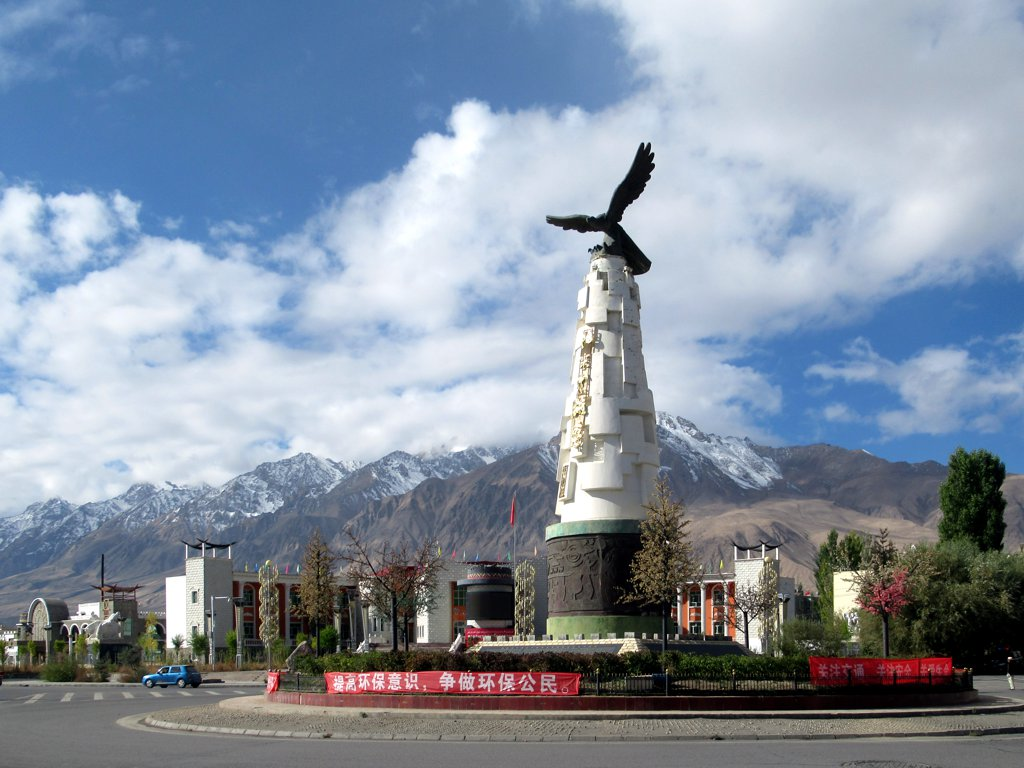
- The Flying Eagle monument in front of Tashkurgan's National Culture and Art Centre
- Etymology: "Stone fortress" in the Turkic languages
- Nickname: Roof of Xinjiang
- Location of Tashkurgan in Xinjiang
- Coordinates: 37°46′22″N 75°13′28″E
- Country: China
- Region: Xinjiang
- Prefecture: Kashgar
- County: Tashkurgan
- Residential communities: 6

Area
  - Total: 4 km^{2} (1.5 sq mi)
- Elevation: 3,094 m (10,151 ft)

Population (2010)
  - Total: 8,919
  - Density: 2,200/km^{2} (5,800/sq mi)

Ethnic groups
  - Major ethnic groups: Tajiks (Pamiris)
- Time zone: UTC+8 (China Standard)

Tashkurgan, (Note: Official English spelling: Taxkorgan; Alternate English spelling: Tashkorgan; Chinese: 塔什库尔干镇; pinyin: Tǎshíkù'ěrgān Zhèn; Uyghur: تاشقورغان بازىرى, romanized: Tashqorghan Baziri; Sarikoli: تاشقۈرغان بۇزۇر, romanized: Toxkhürghon Buzur) historically known as Sarikol and Shitoucheng, is a town in the far west of China, close to the country's border with Tajikistan. It is seat of Tashkurgan Tajik Autonomous County, in the autonomous region of Xinjiang. Tajiks – ethnic Pamiris who live in the Pamir Mountains of Xinjiang – make up a little over half of Tashkurgan's population.

Tashkurgan was a significant stop on the Silk Road, with roads leading to major centers of trade such as Kashgar. It also served as the capital of a number of ancient and pre-modern kingdoms.

== Etymology ==
Tashkurgan

Chinese name
- Simplified Chinese: 塔什库尔干镇
- Traditional Chinese: 塔什庫爾干鎮
Transcriptions
Standard Mandarin
- Hanyu Pinyin: Tǎshíkù'ěrgān Zhèn

Former Chinese name
- Simplified Chinese: 石头城
- Traditional Chinese: 石頭城
- Literal meaning: stone city
Transcriptions
Standard Mandarin
- Hanyu Pinyin: Shítouchéng
- Wade–Giles: Shih^{2}-t'ou-ch'eng^{2}

Uyghur name
- Uyghur: تاشقورغان بازىرى
Transcriptions
- Latin Yëziqi: Tashqorghan Baziri
- Yengi Yeziⱪ: Taxⱪorƣan Baziri
- SASM/GNC: Taxk̂orĝan Baziri

Sarikoli name
- Sarikoli: توشقۈرغون بۇزۇر; Toxkhürghon Buzur (Note: There is no official orthography for Sarikoli in China. This is the spelling used in the Sarikoli-Chinese dictionary written by linguist Gao Erqiang.) [tɔʃqyrʁɔn buzur]

The town is named after a stone fortress to its north; Tashkurgan accordingly means "stone fortress" in the Turkic languages. The official English spelling (per the Chinese government) of the name is Taxkorgan, while Tashkorgan appears occasionally in literature. The historical Chinese name for the town was Shitoucheng (石頭城), which literally means "stone city" in the context of a fortified city. The town was also historically known as Sarikol (Chagatay: ساریق قول, romanized: sarïq-qol, or ساریقول, sarïqol), after the Sarikol Range. The modern Uyghur name of the town is Tashqorghan (تاشقورغان).

== History ==
=== Ancient and pre-modern history ===
Tashkurgan has a long history as a stop on the Silk Road. Major caravan routes converged here leading to Kashgar in the north, Kargilik to the east, Badakhshan and Wakhan to the west, and Chitral and Hunza to the southwest (present-day Khyber Pakhtunkhwa and Gilgit-Baltistan, Pakistan).

About 2,000 years ago, during the Han dynasty, Tashkurgan was the main centre of the Kingdom of Puli (蒲犁) mentioned in the Book of Han and the Book of the Later Han. Later it became known as Varshadeh. Mentions in the Weilüe of the Kingdom of Manli (滿犁) probably also refer to Tashkurgan.

Some scholars believe that Tashkurgan is the "Stone Tower" mentioned by Ptolemy in his famous treatise Geography, which is said to have marked the midway point between Europe and China on the old Silk Road. Other scholars, however, disagree with this identification, though it remains one of the four most probable sites for the Stone Tower.

Centuries later Tashkurgan became the capital of the Sarikol Kingdom located in the Pamir Mountains, and later of Qiepantuo (謁盤陀) under the Persian Empire. At the northeast corner of the town is a huge fortress known as the Tashkurgan Fort dating from the Yuan dynasty (1279–1368 CE) and the subject of many colourful local legends. A ruined fire temple is near the fortress.

The Buddhist monk Xuanzang passed through Tashkurgan around 649 CE, on his way to Khotan from Badakhshan, as did Song Yun around 500 CE. When British archaeologist Aurel Stein passed through the town in the early twentieth century he was pleased to find that Tashkurgan matched the descriptions left by those travellers: discussing Qiepantuo, Xuanzang recorded (in Samuel Beal's translation): "This country is about 200 li in circuit; the capital rests on a great rocky crag of the mountain, and is backed by the river Śitâ. It is about 20 li in circuit." Xuanzang's discussion of Qiepantuo in book twelve of Great Tang Records on the Western Regions recounts a tale which might explain the name of Princess Castle, a tourist attraction near Tashkurgan: A Han Chinese princess on her way to marry a Persian king is placed on a high rock for safety during local unrest. She becomes pregnant from a mysterious stranger, ultimately giving birth to a powerful king and founding the royal line ruling at the time of Xuanzang's visit. Stein records a version of this, current at the time of his visit, in which the princess is the daughter of the Persian king Naushīrvān. The Princess Castle is believed to be located 70 kilometres (43 mi) south of the town near Chalachigu Valley.

Stein argued that, judging from the topography and remains found around Tashkurgan, the fort and associated settlements had clearly been central to the broader Sarikol area, controlling routes from the Oxus to the oases of southern Turkestan.

Xuanzang describes a substantial Buddhist site with tall towers, leading Stein to speculate as to whether the pilgrimage site dedicated to Shāh Auliya, several hundred yards to the northeast of the town site, and in use at the time of his visit, might have seen continuous but changing local use as a holy site down the centuries.

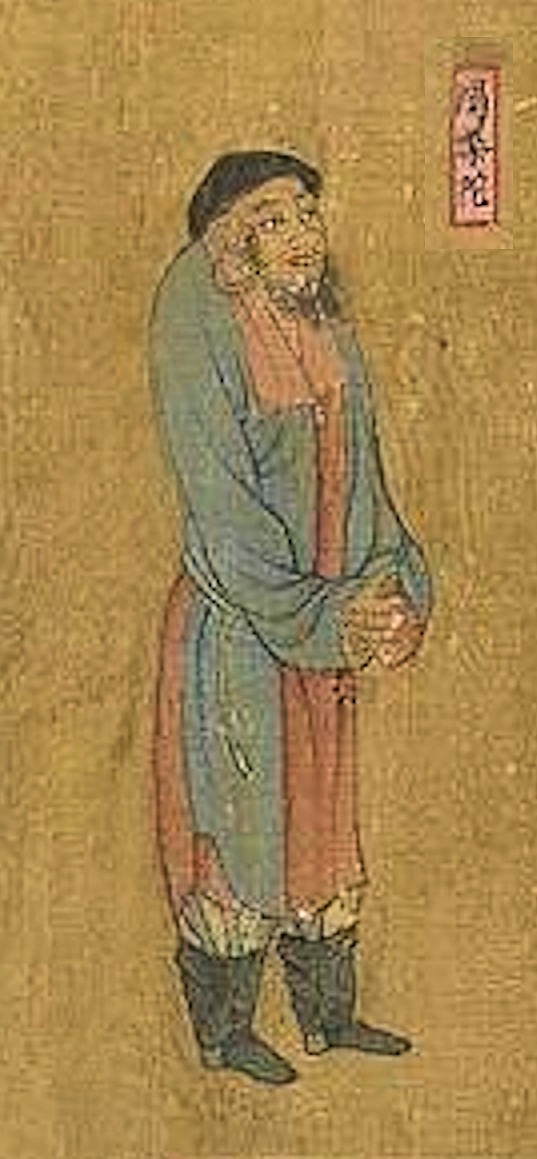
An ambassador from Qiepantuo to the Tang dynasty, in The Gathering of Kings, c. 650 CE

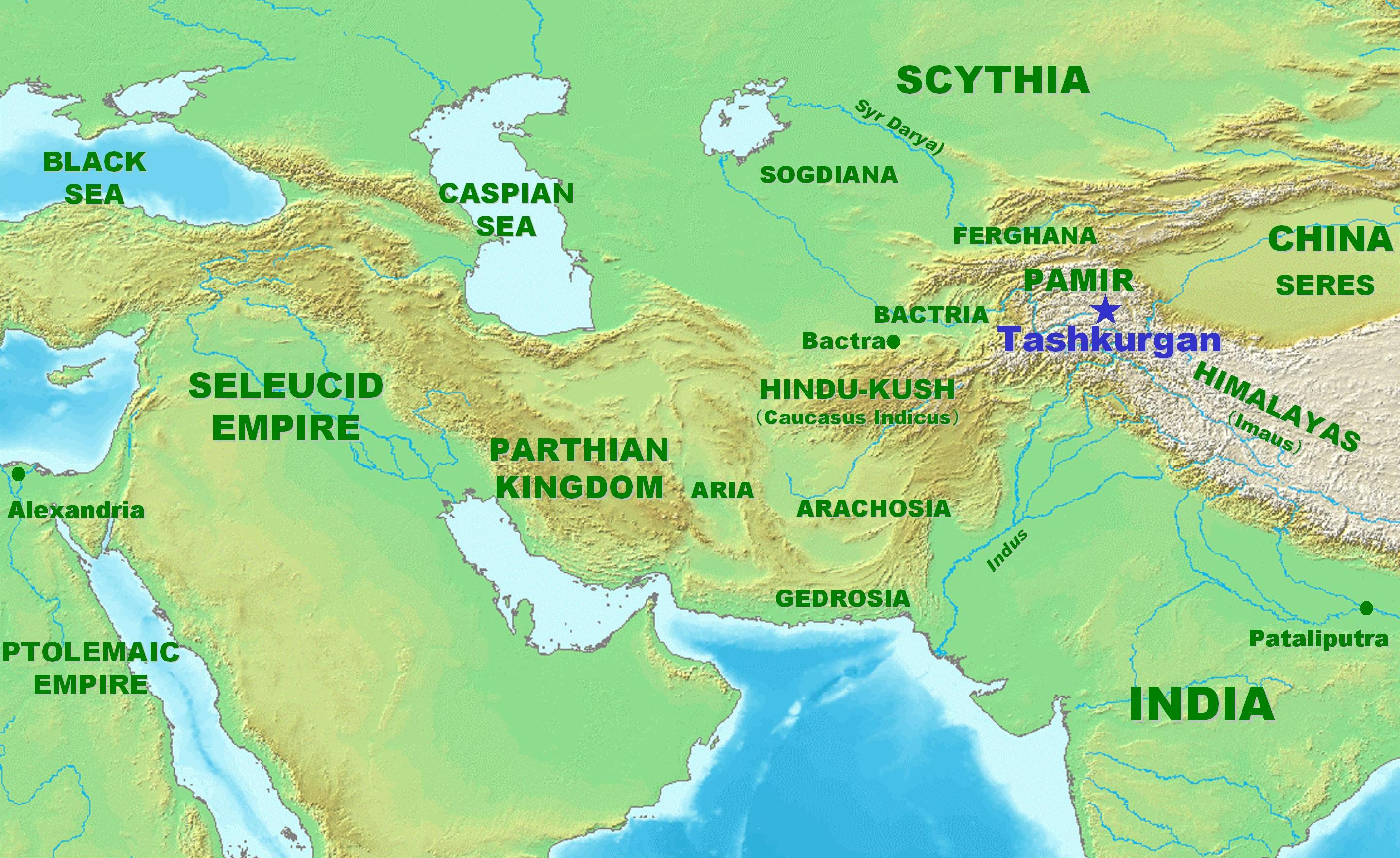
Tashkurgan is thought by some scholars to be the "Stone Tower" of Ptolemy, where caravans from the West met to trade with those from China.

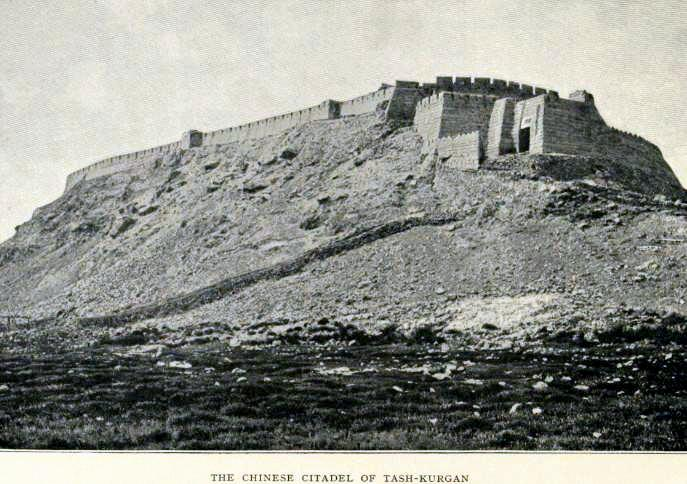
Tashkurgan Fort in 1909

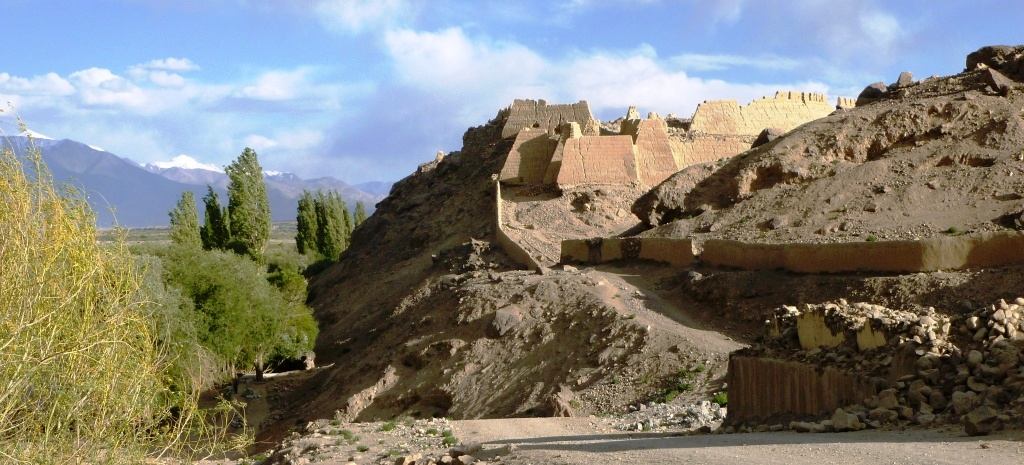
Ruins of Tashkurgan Fort in 2011

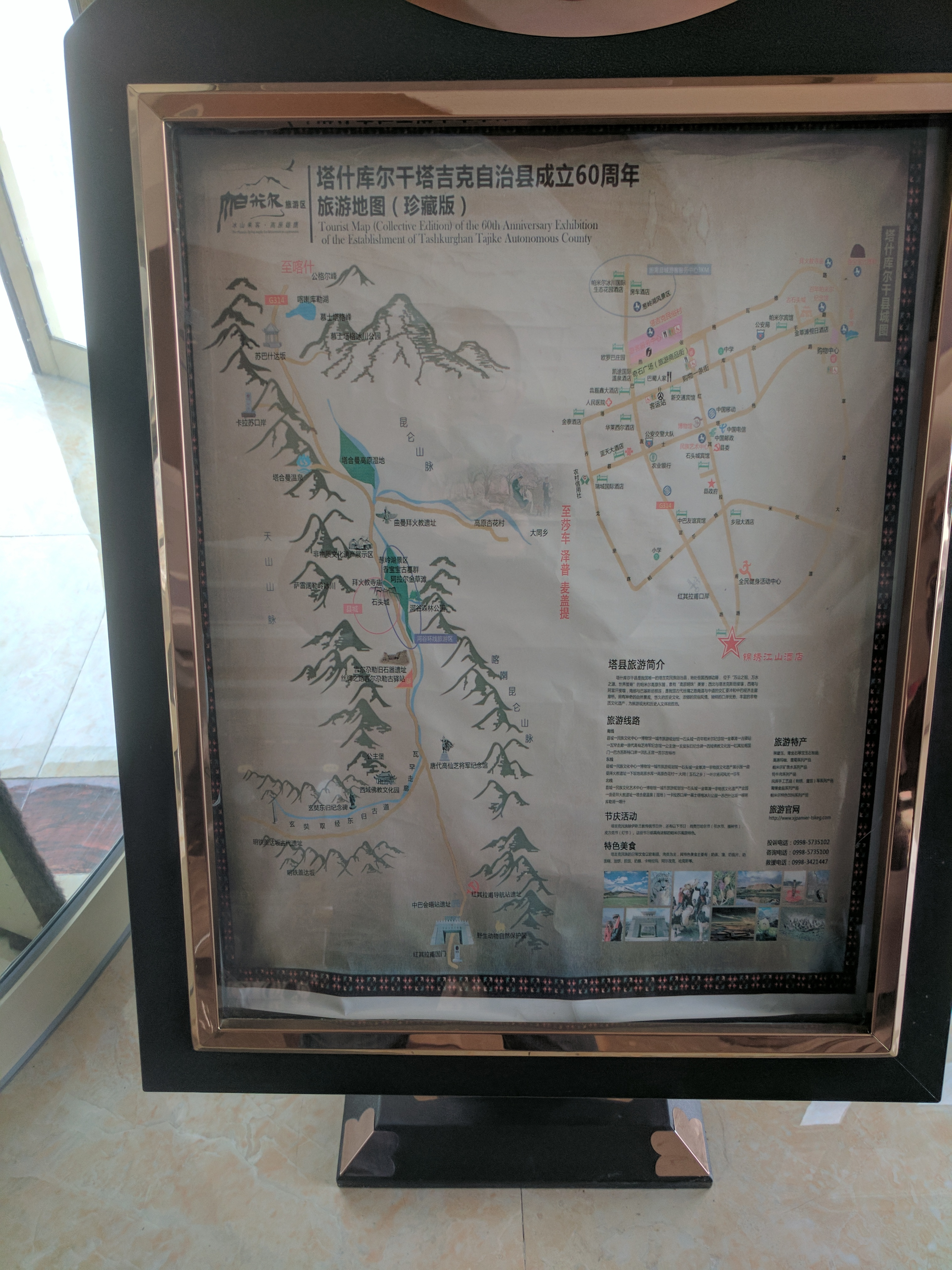
A map for tourists showing Tashkurgan Fort and Princess Castle at different locations

=== Modern history ===
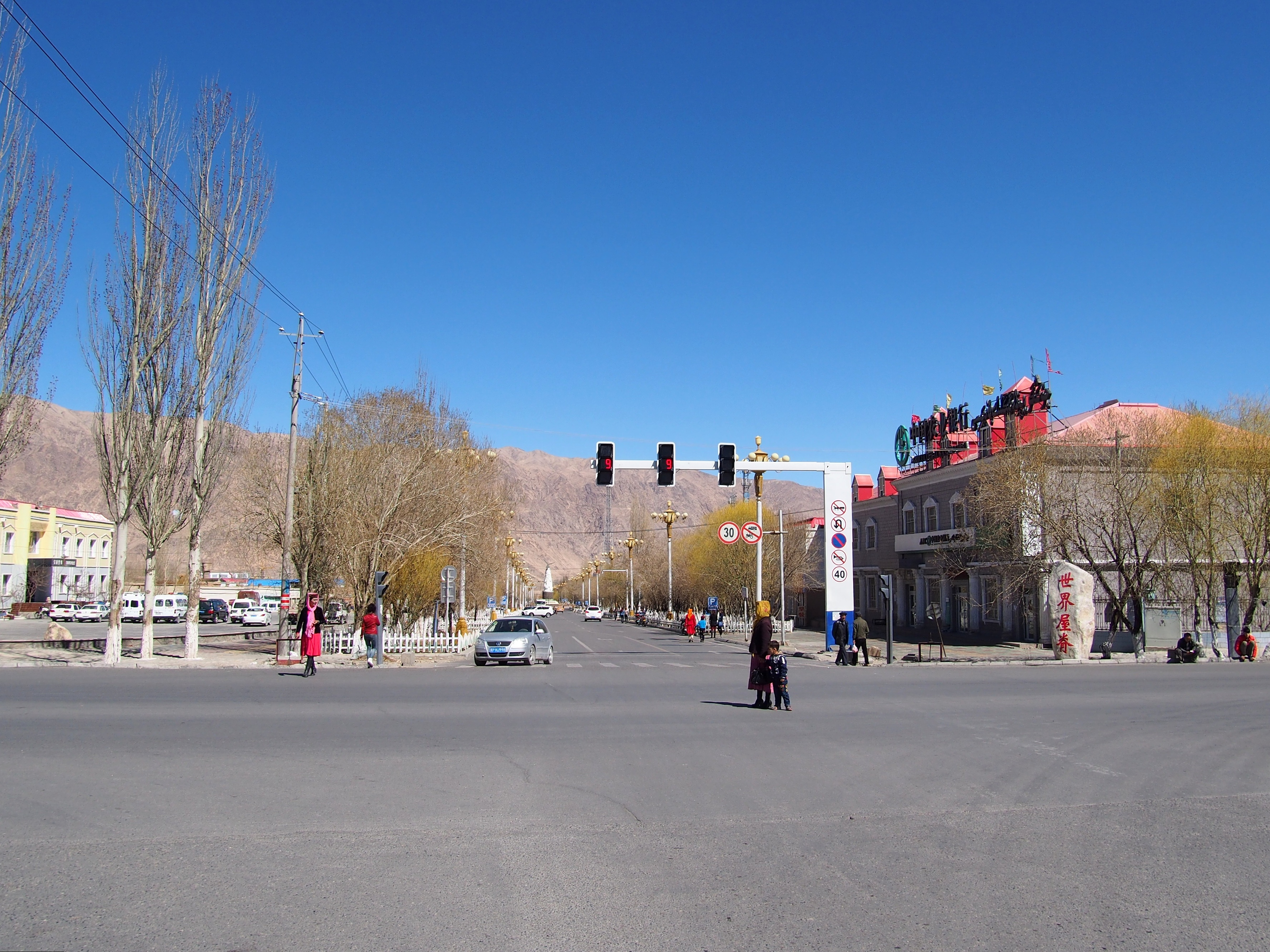
An intersection in Tashkurgan, 2015

During the Ili Rebellion from 1944 to 1949, Uyghur forces slaughtered the livestock of Tajiks as they advanced south.

In 1959, Tashkurgan Commune (塔什库尔干公社) was established.

In 1984, Tashkurgan Commune became Tashkurgan Town.

A number of residential communities have been added to and removed from Tashkurgan for census purposes. In 2010–2011, the residential communities of Bulakegale (布拉克尕勒社区) and Xudong (旭东社区) were added to the town and Kuonabazha (阔纳巴扎社区) and Yingshahai'er (英沙海尔社区) were removed. In 2016–2017, the residential community Xingfu (幸福社区) was added to the town. In 2017–2018, the residential community Hongqi (红旗社区) was added to the town. In 2018–2019, the residential community Shajilin (沙棘林社区) was added to the town.

== Museum ==
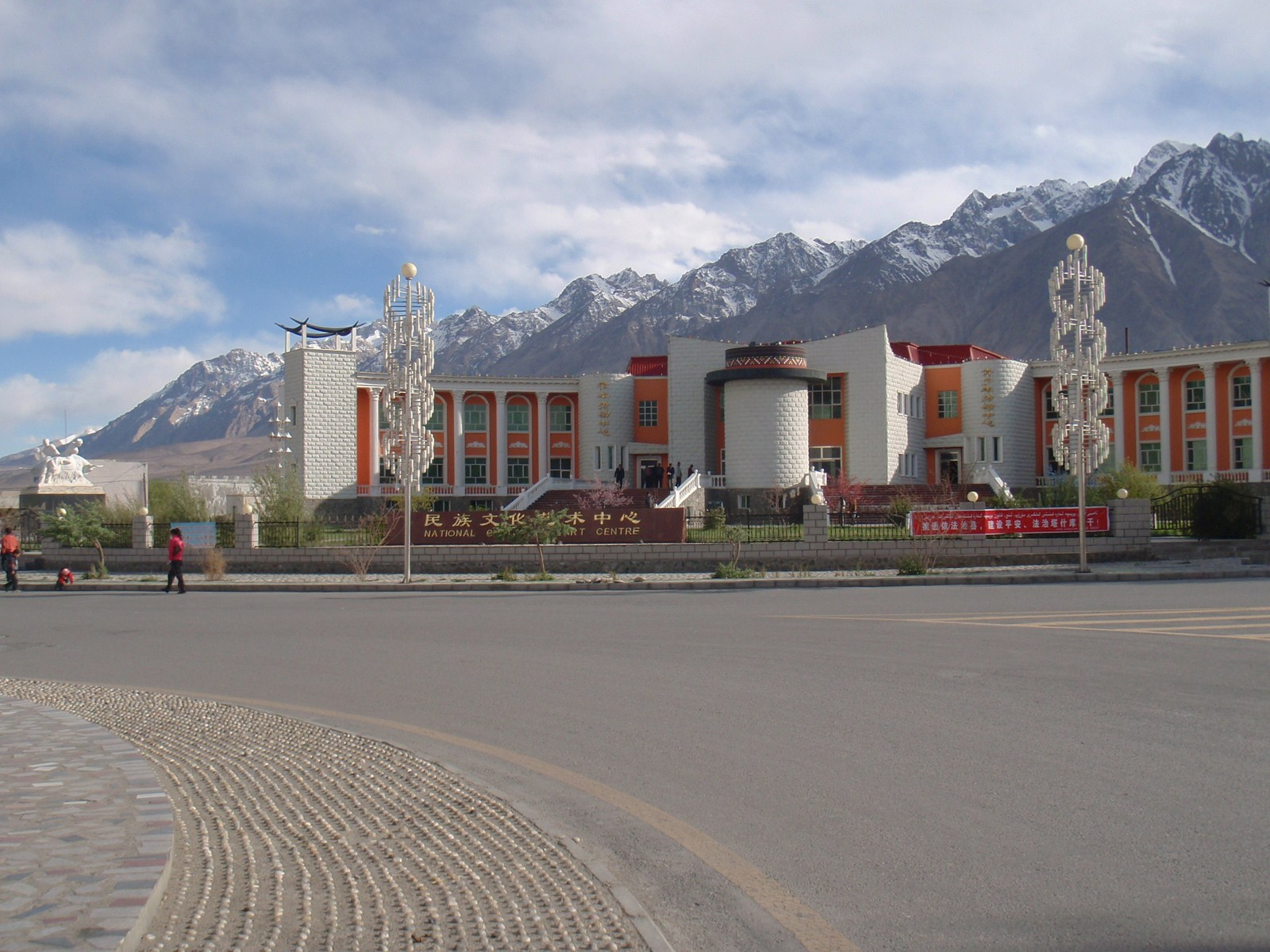
Tashkurgan National Culture and Art Centre

In Tashkurgan there is a museum named the National Culture and Art Centre that houses a few local artifacts, a photographic display and, in the basement, two mummies – one of a young woman about 18 and another of a baby about three months old who was not hers. They are labelled as dating from the Bronze Age to the Warring States period (475–221 BCE). The mummies were discovered in the nearby Xiabandi Valley on the old caravan route to Yarkand. The valley has now been flooded for a hydro-electric project.

== Geography ==
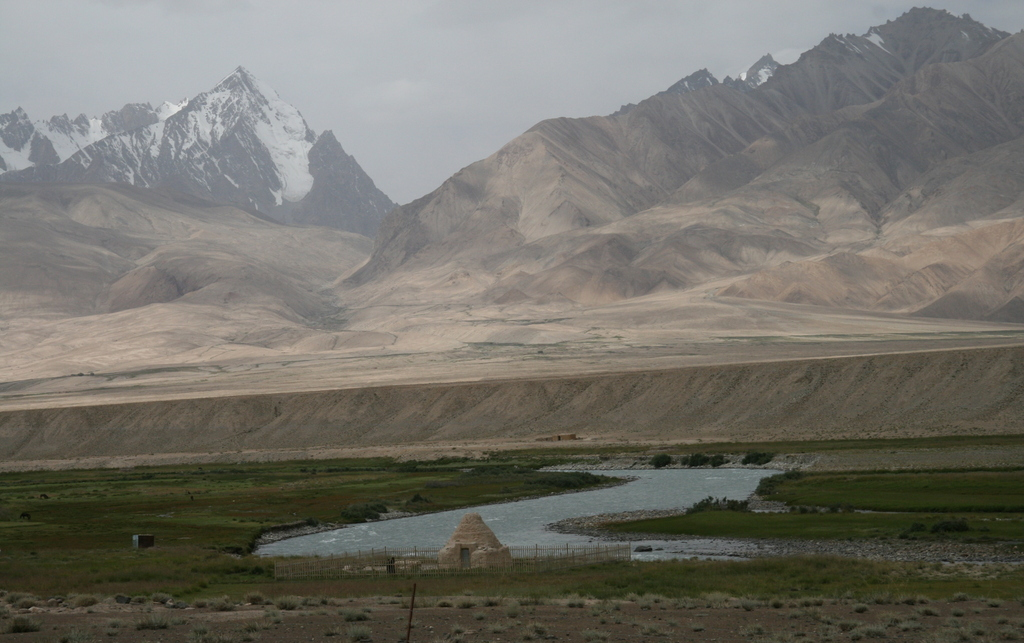
Caravanserai between Dafdar and Tashkurgan

Tashkurgan is the seat of Tashkurgan Tajik Autonomous County. It is situated at an altitude of 3,090 metres (10,140 ft) on the borders of both Afghanistan and Tajikistan, and close to the borders of Kyrgyzstan and Pakistan. Tashkurgan is a market town for sheep, wool and woollen goods, particularly carpets, and is surrounded by orchards. The majority population in the town are Tajiks (Pamiris). The majority of people in the region speak Sarikoli. There is also a village of Wakhi speakers. Mandarin and Uyghur are also spoken.

The Tashkurgan River begins just north of the Khunjerab Pass and flows north along the Karakoram Highway to Tashkurgan. Just north of Tashkurgan it turns east and flows through a gorge to the Tarim Basin where it joins the Yarkand River.

=== Climate ===
Tashkurgan has a cold desert climate (Köppen BWk), influenced by the high elevation, with long, very cold winters, and warm summers. Monthly daily average temperatures range from −11.9 °C (10.6 °F) in January to 16.4 °C (61.5 °F) in July, while the annual mean is 3.58 °C (38.4 °F). An average of only 68 millimetres (2.68 in) of precipitation falls per year.

Climate data for Tashkurgan, elevation 3,090 m (10,140 ft), (1991–2020 normals, extremes 1971–2010)
Month	Jan	Feb	Mar	Apr	May	Jun	Jul	Aug	Sep	Oct	Nov	Dec	Year
Record high °C (°F)	6.5 (43.7)	12.2 (54.0)	18.9 (66.0)	22.0 (71.6)	25.1 (77.2)	31.0 (87.8)	32.5 (90.5)	31.4 (88.5)	27.8 (82.0)	22.7 (72.9)	14.3 (57.7)	10.5 (50.9)	32.5 (90.5)
Mean daily maximum °C (°F)	−4.1 (24.6)	0.3 (32.5)	7.4 (45.3)	13.3 (55.9)	17.4 (63.3)	20.9 (69.6)	24.1 (75.4)	23.3 (73.9)	19.2 (66.6)	12.2 (54.0)	5.7 (42.3)	−1.3 (29.7)	11.5 (52.8)
Daily mean °C (°F)	−11.8 (10.8)	−6.8 (19.8)	0.7 (33.3)	6.6 (43.9)	10.4 (50.7)	13.8 (56.8)	16.8 (62.2)	16.1 (61.0)	11.9 (53.4)	4.7 (40.5)	−2.3 (27.9)	−9.2 (15.4)	4.2 (39.6)
Mean daily minimum °C (°F)	−18.6 (−1.5)	−13.9 (7.0)	−6.3 (20.7)	−0.2 (31.6)	3.7 (38.7)	7.1 (44.8)	9.9 (49.8)	9.4 (48.9)	4.1 (39.4)	−3.1 (26.4)	−9.6 (14.7)	−15.9 (3.4)	−2.8 (27.0)
Record low °C (°F)	−40.1 (−40.2)	−36.0 (−32.8)	−25.7 (−14.3)	−11.5 (11.3)	−5.6 (21.9)	−1.0 (30.2)	2.2 (36.0)	−0.2 (31.6)	−5.0 (23.0)	−12.2 (10.0)	−23.3 (−9.9)	−31.5 (−24.7)	−40.1 (−40.2)
Average precipitation mm (inches)	2.7 (0.11)	3.5 (0.14)	3.2 (0.13)	5.3 (0.21)	11.7 (0.46)	19.7 (0.78)	13.6 (0.54)	12.7 (0.50)	7.8 (0.31)	2.1 (0.08)	0.8 (0.03)	2.3 (0.09)	85.4 (3.38)
Average precipitation days (≥ 0.1 mm)	2.4	2.5	2.3	2.8	5.9	7.6	6.8	6.3	2.9	1.9	0.4	1.4	43.2
Average snowy days	3.6	3.7	4.7	4.8	3.1	0.5	0	0	0.4	2.8	1.3	2.0	26.9
Average relative humidity (%)	52	46	36	33	37	41	40	42	41	38	40	47	41
Mean monthly sunshine hours	174.9	171.1	229.6	258.9	282.3	296.3	314.2	285.2	269.8	254.6	212.3	181.1	2,930.3
Percentage possible sunshine	57	55	61	65	64	67	71	69	74	75	71	61	66
Source 1: China Meteorological Administration
Source 2: Weather China

== Administrative divisions ==
As of 2019, the town included six residential communities (Mandarin Chinese pinyin-derived names):

- Kashigale (喀什尕勒社区), Bulakegale (布拉克尕勒社区), Xudong (旭东社区), Xingfu (幸福社区), Hongqi (红旗社区), Shajilin (沙棘林社区)

As of 2009, there were three residential communities:

- Kashigale (喀什尕勒社区), Kuonabazha (阔纳巴扎社区), Yingshahai'er (英沙海尔社区)

== Transportation ==
As the area is remote from populated regions, it is served by Tashiku'ergan Hongqilafu Airport, which opened on 23 December 2022, with 3800 meter runway. It is China's closest airport to Pakistan, Tajikistan, and Afghanistan. The airport offers one flight to Kashgar every day.

=== Karakoram Highway ===
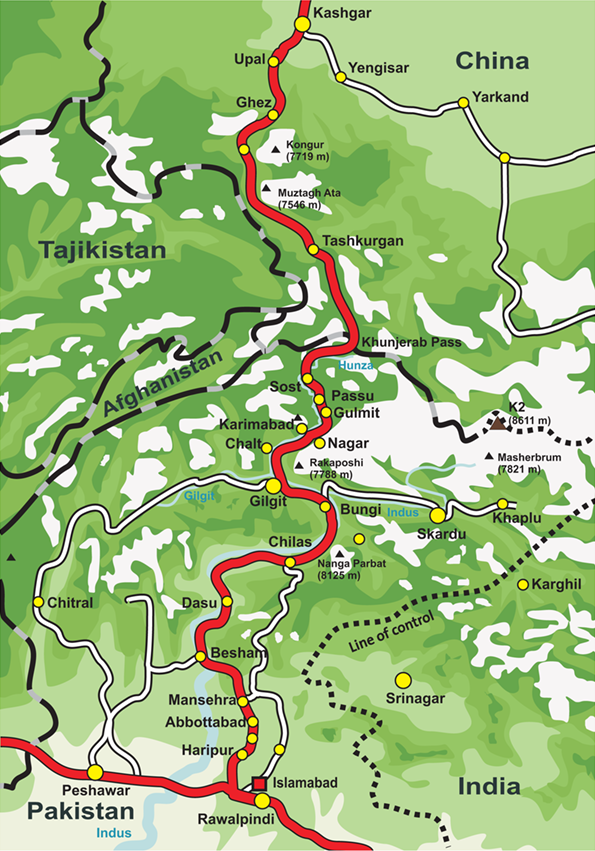
Overview of the Karakoram Highway

Today Tashkurgan is on the Karakoram Highway which follows the old Silk Road route from China to Pakistan. Accommodation is available and it is a recommended overnight stop for road travellers from China to Pakistan, in order to have the best chance of crossing the snow-prone Khunjerab Pass in daylight. Special registration with the police must be made before entering Tashkurgan, and Chinese citizens must receive written permission from their local police department before entering the region.

Travelling from Xinjiang, it is about 230 kilometres (140 mi) south of Kashgar and is the last town before the border with Pakistan. It is 120 kilometres (75 mi) over the Khunjerab Pass from Sust, which is the Pakistani border town. Passenger road service between Tashkurgan and the Pakistani towns of Sust and Gilgit has existed for many years, and road service between Kashgar and Gilgit (via Tashkurgan and Sust) started in summer 2006. However, the border crossing between China and Pakistan at Khunjerab Pass (the highest border of the world) is open only between 1 May and 15 October. During winter, the roads are blocked by snow.

== See also ==
- Belt and Road Initiative
- Silk Road transmission of Buddhism
- Taghdumbash Pamir
- Taxkorgan Nature Reserve
- List of township-level divisions of Xinjiang
