= The Red Book of the Peoples of the Russian Empire =

1991 book

- Author: Margus Kolga, Igor Tõnurist, Lembit Vaba, and Jüri Viikberg
- Language: Estonian
- Published: Väljaandja AS Nyman & Nyman LNT (1991); NGO Red Book (2001)
- Publication date: 1991
- Publication place: Estonia
- English publication date: 2001
- ISBN: 9985-9369-2-2

The Red Book of the Peoples of the Russian Empire (Estonian: Vene impeeriumi rahvaste punane raamat) is a book about the small nations of the Russian Empire, the Soviet Union, and Russia and some other post-Soviet states of today. It was written by Margus Kolga, Igor Tõnurist, Lembit Vaba, and Jüri Viikberg. It was published in Estonian in 1991 and in English in 2001.

The foreword of the book explains the book's approach by saying, "the authors of the present book, who come from a country (Estonia) which has shared the fate of nations in the Russian and Soviet empires, endeavour to publicize the plight of the small nations whose very existence is threatened as a result of recent history."

== Described peoples ==
The authors' intention for the book was to include the peoples according to the following criteria:

- are not yet extinct,
- whose main area of settlement is on ex-Soviet territory,
- whose numbers are below 30,000,
- of whom less than 70% speak their native language,
- who form a minority on their ancient territory,
- whose settlement is scattered rather than compact,
- who have no vernacular school, literature or media.

(The names are given in the spelling of the original translation of the book.)

- Abazians (Abaza) – Abkhaz – Aguls – Akhvakhs – Aleuts – Altaics – Aliutors – Andis – Archis – Asiatic Eskimos
- Bagulals – Baraba Tatars – Bartangs – Bats – Bezhtas – Botlikhs – Budukhs
- Central Asian Jews – Chamalals – Chukchis – Chulym Tatars – Crimean Jews – Crimean Tatars
- Didos (Tsez) – Dolgans
- Enets – Evens – Evenks
- Georgian Jews – Godoberis
- Hinukhs – Hunzibs
- Ingrians – Ishkashmis – Itelmens – Izhorians
- Kamas – Karaims – Karatas – Karelians – Kereks – Kets – Khakass – Khants – Khinalugs – Khufis – Khwarshis – Kola Lapps – Koryaks – Kryts – Kurds
- Lithuanian Tatars – Livonians
- Mansis – Mountain Jews
- Nanais – Negidals – Nenets – Nganasans – Nivkhs – Nogays
- Orochis – Oroks – Oroshoris
- Peoples of the Pamirs
- Roshanis – Rutuls
- Selkups – Shors – Shughnis
- Tabasarans – Talysh – Tats (Tatians) – Tindis – Tofalars – Trukhmens (Turkhmens) – Tsakhurs
- Udeghes – Udis – Ulchis
- Veps – Votes
- Wakhs
- Yaghnabis – Yazgulamis – Yukaghirs

== Publications and reception ==
It was published in Estonian in 1991 and in English in 2001. Its publication was followed in 1993 by another book, Cultural Survival.

The Estonian newspaper Postimees, reviewing the English version, said the book did not "offer any tangible solutions for the peoples who are suffering". The reviewer criticized the book for being published in haste, noting typographic mistakes and strange footnotes, though said the book was published with good intentions. Akadeemia said that though the book contained great work, the title of the Estonian work may be insulting to the peoples discussed in the volume, and carried a propagandist quality.

Writing in Library+Information Update, Peter Hoare called it a "fascinating book, with much well-documented information about languages, ethnic origins, current cultural and political situations etc, presented in a standard and comprehensible format complete with maps."
