= Shughni people =

Iranian-Pamiri ethnic group

Shughni Shughnan
xuǧnůni, хуг̌ну̊нӣ, خُږنۈنے

Regions with significant populations
- Tajikistan (Shughnon District): 50,000 (1990)
- Afghanistan (Shighnan District): 40,000 (2009)
- Pakistan (Chitral District): 855
- China (Taxkorgan Tajik Autonomous County): 171

Languages
- Shughni, Tajik, Dari, Khowar

Religion
- Nizari Isma'ili Shia Islam

Related ethnic groups
- Other Pamiris, especially Wakhis, Oroshoris, Bartangis, Khufis, Rushanis, Sarikolis, and Vanjis

The Shughni (also known as the Shughnan) (Shughni: xuǧnůni, хуг̌ну̊нӣ, خُږنۈنے) are an Iranian sub-ethnic group of Pamiris, who reside in the Pamir Mountains of the Badakhshan region of Central Asia. They mostly live in the country of Tajikistan, while a minority lives in Afghanistan, Pakistan, and China. They speak the Shughni language, an Eastern Iranian language of the Pamiri subgroup.

== History ==
The region of Shughnan was mentioned in Chinese books during the 6th and 7th centuries.

The ancient Shughnis kept the Shughnan region under their control. Proof had been found about the Shughni people's oral traditions in Ghoron. The Shughni tribes had also collaborated with the Mongols during the conquest of Afghanistan.

The Kingdom of Shighnan with its capital at a site named in Chinese sources as Kunun was ruled by its own amir through the Middle Ages. The territory of the kingdom was roughly coequivalent with the current Shughnan district of Badakhshan province.

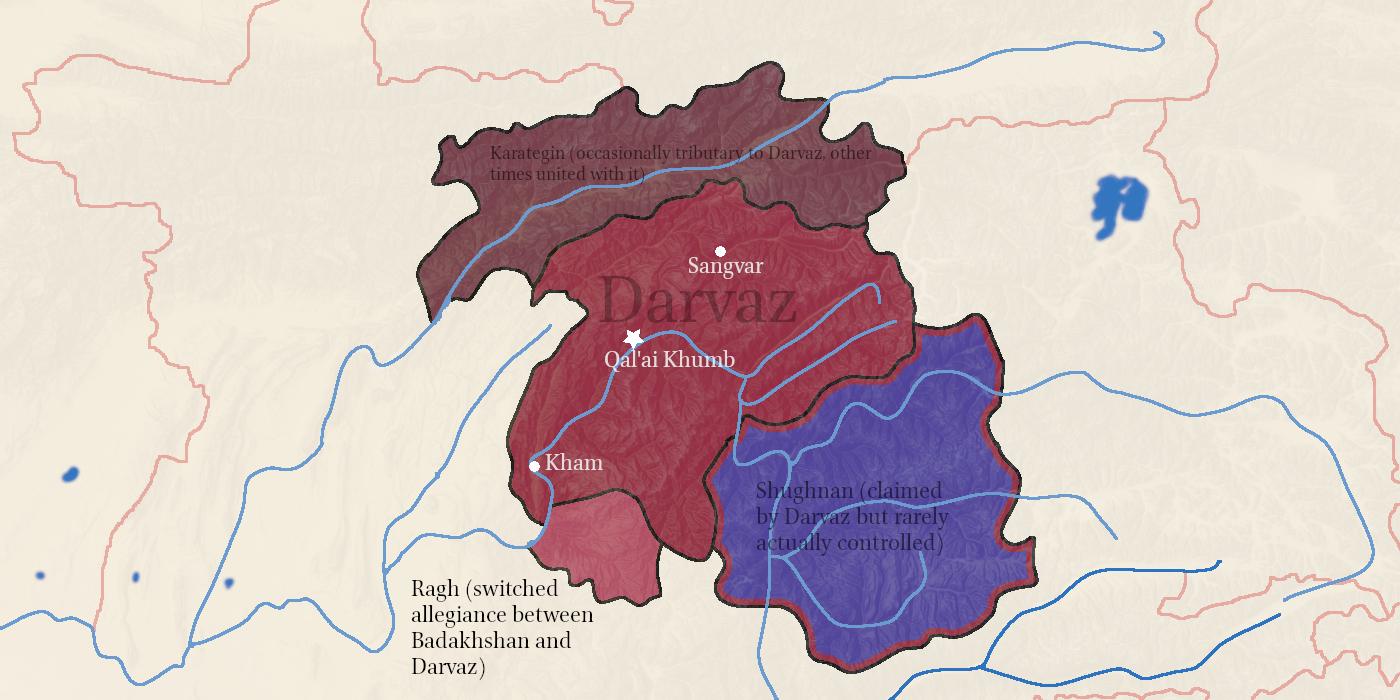
Map of the Kingdom of Shighnan.

During the early modern era this kingdom was involved in constant territorial disputes with the micro - kingdom of Darvoz to their north and to the south with the Wakhan kingdom and the neighboring people of the trading centre of Ishkoshim, Tajikistan. The city of Rushan to the east was steadily under their rule such that the language of that city is today a dialect of the Shughnani language.

From 1638 to 1668 the Shughni were subjected by the shah of Darvoz.

The Shughnani kingdom fell to the forces of Abdur Rahman Khan, shah of Afghanistan, in 1888 as part of his conflict with the Emir of Bukhara.

During Soviet times, especially during the Stalin era, Soviet and Tajik authorities tried their best to assimilate the Shughni with the Tajik population. Even after Soviet times, the Shughni, Ishkashim, Rushani, and Wakhi tribes still fought over territory near the borders of Afghanistan and Tajikistan.

== Lifestyle ==
Due to political reasons the Shughni and Rushani go by the name "Tajik" unlike other Pamiri groups. The Shughani are engaged in mountain agriculture and have succeeded in a greater agriculture basis from the Rabbani government. The Shughni were formerly raiders, but are now seen as servants and pedlars in big cities in Central Asia such as Kabul and Farghana. They have also supplemented to 'scanty' resources in Shughnan. The Shughani have also gone to Chitral in Pakistan to find jobs recently.

== Language ==
The Shughni language is an Eastern Iranian language of the Pamiri subgroup spoken in Tajikistan and Afghanistan, primarily in Gorno-Badakhshan and Sheghnan. Shughani is the largest of the Pamiri languages and contains many dialects including Rushani, Bartangri, and Oroshori.
