= Languages of Tajikistan =

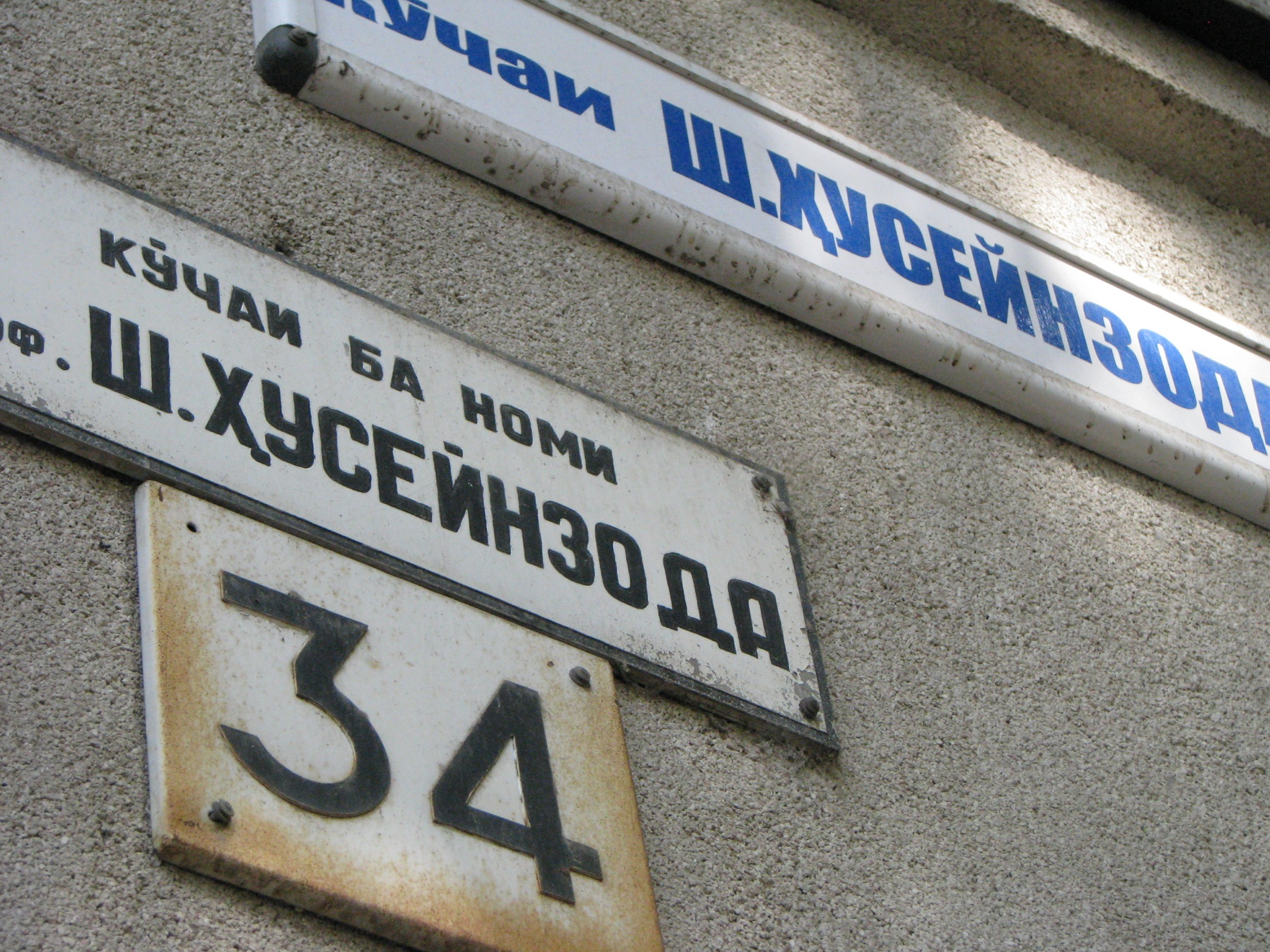
- Tajik-language street signs in Dushanbe
- Official: Persian Tajik (state); Russian (interethnic)
- Recognised: Uzbek
- Indigenous: Aimaqi; Bartangi; Bukhori; Ishkashimi; Khowar; Khufi; Oroshani; Pamir Kyrgyz; Parya; Rushani; Sanglechi; Shughni; Uzbek; Wakhi; Yaghnobi; Yazgulyam
- Minority: Armenian; Azerbaijani; Belarusian; Central Asian Arabic; Crimean Tatar; Dungan; Georgian; Hazaragi; Kazakh; Kyrgyz; Kurdish; Koryo-mar; Ossetian; Persian; Tatar; Turkmen; Ukrainian; Uyghur
- Immigrant: Chinese; Dari; Hindi; Kashmiri; Pashto; Punjabi; Urdu
- Foreign: Arabic; English; French; German; Italian; Mandarin Chinese; Persian; Spanish; Turkish
- Signed: Russian-Tajik Sign Language
- Keyboard layout: ЙЦУКЕН (Russian); ЙҚУКЕН (Tajik)
- Alphabet: Tajik; Tajik Braille

There are several languages of Tajikistan, most of which belong in the Indo-Iranian branch of Indo-European languages. Tajikistan officially recognizes the Tajik language – an eastern variety of Persian – as the state language, and Russian as the interethnic language. Uzbek – a Turkic language – is the third-most spoken language in the country, spoken by about 11% of the total population.

Indigenous languages native to the area include Wakhi, Yaghnobi, Parya, and the various Pamir languages. Minority languages include Armenian, Kurdish, Kyrgyz, Korean, Uzbek, Uyghur, and Turkmen. Immigrant languages include Chinese, Dari, Hindi, Pashto, Punjabi, and Urdu. Foreign languages in Tajikistan include Arabic, English, French, German, Mandarin Chinese, Persian, and Turkish.

== Main languages ==
The two official languages of Tajikistan are Tajik as the state language and Russian as the interethnic language, as understood in Article 2 of the Constitution: "The state language of Tajikistan shall be Tajik. Russian shall be the language of international communication." Tajikistan is one of three former Soviet republics in Central Asia to have Russian as a de jure official language, along with Kazakhstan and Kyrgyzstan.

The highly educated part of the population of Tajikistan, as well as the intelligentsia, prefer to speak Persian — the pronunciation of which in Tajikistan is called the "Iranian style" — and Russian.

=== Official languages ===
==== Tajik ====
The state language (Note: Russian: государственный язык, romanized: gosudarstvennyj jazyk; Tajik: забони давлатӣ, romanized: zaboni davlatiy) of the Republic of Tajikistan is Tajik, which is written in the Cyrillic script. Tajik is mutually intelligible with Dari in Afghanistan and Farsi in Iran, as Tajik is a variety of the Persian language. Tajik is also recognised as a minority language in Uzbekistan and in Russia.

==== Russian ====
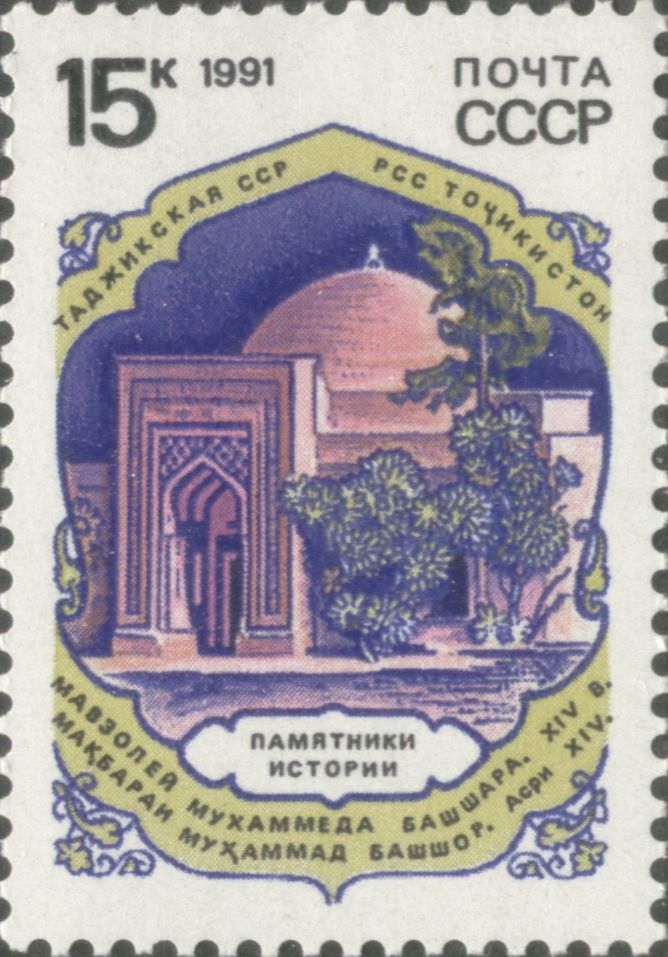
Soviet stamp of 1991 depicting the Mohammed Bashar Mausoleum, with text in Tajik and Russian

According to article 2 of the Constitution of the Republic of Tajikistan, Russian is recognized as the second official language of Tajikistan, i.e., the official language of inter-ethnic communication. (Note: Russian: язык межнационального общения, romanized: jazyk mežnacionaljnogo obšenija; Tajik: забони муоширати байни миллатҳо, romanized: zaboni muoshirati bayni millatho) Russian had previously lost its official status after Tajikistan's independence in late 1991, which was then restored with the Constitution.

Approximately 90% of the population of Tajikistan speaks Russian at various levels. The varieties of Russian spoken in Tajikistan are referred to by scholars as Tajik(istani) Russian and it shares some similarities with Uzbek(istani) Russian — and Central Asian varieties of the Russian language in general — such as morphological differences and the lexical differences like the use of words урюк for a wild apricot or kislushka (кислушка) for 'rhubarb'. Previously, from the creation of the Tajikistan SSR until Tajik becoming the official language on 22 July 1989, the only official language of the republic was Russian, as Tajik had only the status of the "national language".

Colloquial speech has retained almost all Russian borrowed elements (with the exception of words of purely Soviet semantics). Most borrowings, especially colloquial ones, change their phonetics and acquire a sound that is more suitable for the Tajik ear. In most cases, this means, firstly, the shift of stress onto the final syllable (e.g., карто́шка > картошка́, ма́йка > майка́); the loss of a soft sign in Russian borrowings that is absent in Tajik (e.g., апрель > апрел, контроль > контрол); the deaffrication of /ts/ to /s/ (e.g., цирк > сирк, концерт > консерт); the frequent replacement of /a/ with /ɔ/ (e.g., машина > мошин; c.f. Iranian Persian ماشین [mɒːˈʃiːn]); and, also commonly found in other languages of the former Soviet Union, the elision of final unstressed ⟨а⟩ in Russian borrowings (e.g., конфета > конфет; c.f. Azerbaijani konfet, Tatar känfit). However, a number of words remain unchanged: март, газета.

=== Significant minority languages ===
==== Uzbek ====
Apart from Russian, Uzbek is the second most widely spoken language in Tajikistan after Tajik. Native Uzbek speakers live in the north and west of Tajikistan, near the border with Uzbekistan.

== Language composition ==
Tajikistan Native Language Composition
| language | percent |
| Tajiki Persian | 84.4% |
| Uzbek | 11.9% |
| Kyrgyz | 0.8% |
| Russian | 0.5% |
| Other | 2.4% |

== Other minority languages ==
After Tajik, Russian, and Uzbek, in terms of number of native speakers are the various Pamir languages, whose native speakers live in Gorno-Badakhshan Autonomous Region. The majority of Zoroastrians in Tajikistan speak one of the Pamir languages. Pamiris often view the exclusion of their languages from educational and official spheres in favour of Tajik as threatening intentional and gradual assimilation. The only support for their languages is from the private Aga Khan foundation. Moreover, Pamiris rarely occupy higher positions of power than first deputy and are not present in law enforcement and security owing to suspicions of anti-government sympathies — such as during the Tajikistani Civil War — and more favourable views towards Russia and Russians contextualised in the annexation of Crimea by the Russian Federation.

Native speakers of Kyrgyz live in the north of Gorno-Badakhshan, Lakhsh District, Kanibadam near the border with Kyrgyzstan.

Yagnobi speakers live in the west of the country. The Parya language of local Romani people (Central Asian Romani) is also widely spoken in Tajikistan. Tajikistan also has small communities of native speakers of Persian, Arabic, Pashto, Georgian, Armenian, Azerbaijani, Tatar, Turkmen, Kazakh, Chinese, Ukrainian.

== Foreign languages ==
Among foreign languages, the most popular European language is English, which is taught in schools in Tajikistan. English is more popular among young people, as well as those working in the tourism sector of Tajikistan. French and German are also taught in schools as foreign languages.

Turkish and Arabic are also common foreign languages of study in Tajikistan – the former being more popular among the Uzbek minority.

Additionally, Mandarin Chinese has become a popular language of study, in part due to Tajikistan's geographical proximity with China, and the two countries' bilateral relations.

== See also ==
- Demographics of Tajikistan
