= Pajwar =

- Location in Afghanistan
- Coordinates: 37°54′N 71°27′E
- Country: Afghanistan
- Province: Badakhshan Province
- Time zone: + 4.30

Pajwar is a village in Rushan, Shughnan district, Badakhshan Province, north-eastern Afghanistan.

The people of this village speak the Roshani language (sometimes considered a dialect of Shighnan) and also Persian.

== See also ==
- Shughnan
- Badakhshan Province
