= Assamese grammar =

Grammar of the Assamese language

Assamese grammar (Assamese: অসমীয়া ব্যাকৰণ Oxömia byakoron) is the study of the morphology and syntax of Assamese, an Indo-European language spoken in Northeast India, primarily in the state of Assam. It has long served as a lingua franca in parts of Northeast India. Although Assamese is typically written in the Assamese script, a romanization is also used here to suggest the pronunciation. Since there are many varieties of Assamese, the standard variety is used here.

== Overview ==
The Assamese language has the following characteristic morphological features:

- Gender and number are not grammatically marked.
- There is a lexical distinction of gender in the third person pronoun.
- Transitive verbs are distinguished from intransitive.
- The agentive case is overtly marked as distinct from the accusative.
- Kinship nouns are inflected for personal pronominal possession.
- Adverbs can be derived from the verb roots.
- A passive construction may be employed idiomatically.

== Pronouns ==
=== Personal pronouns ===
Assamese personal pronouns are somewhat similar to English pronouns, having different words for first, second, and third person, and also for singular and plural (unlike for verbs, below). However, Assamese has two different third-person pronouns for proximity. The first, called proximal, are used for someone who is present in the discussion, and the second, called distal, are for those who are nearby or at a distance but not present in the discussion. Gendered pronouns are present only in third person non-honorific. Additionally, each of the second- and third-person pronouns have different forms for the familiar and polite forms; the second person also has a "very familiar" form (sometimes called "despective"). It may be noted that the "very familiar" form is used when addressing particularly close friends or family as well as for addressing subordinates, or in abusive language.

In the following tables, the abbreviations used are as follows:

m. = masculine,

f. = feminine,

ng. = no specific gender,

— = same as the absolutive forms

The absolutive and ergative/nominative cases are used for pronouns that are the subject of the sentence, such as "I already did that" or "Will you go there?". The ergative/nominative case is used when the verb in a sentence is transitive. If intransitive then the absolutive forms are used. The oblique forms are used when other case suffixes are added, similar to English hi- in hi-, hi-s. See Nouns for details on cases.

Personal pronouns
					absolutive	ergative (Note: Only the pronouns having plural suffixes get the ergative case marking -e due to historical reasons. The singular pronoun এখেত (ekhet)/তেখেত (tekhet) also gets the ergative marking because the -খেত (-khet) was originally a suffix.)	oblique	objective	genitive "of"	instrumental "by"	dative "for"	locative "in"
1st person	singular				মই (moi, I)	—	মো- (mü-)	মোক (mük)	মোৰ (mür) (Note: my, mine)	মোৰে (müre)	মোলৈ (müloi) (Note: to/for me)	মোত (müt)
1st person	plural				আমি (ami, we)	—	আমা- (ama-)	আমাক (amak)	আমাৰ (amar)	আমাৰে (amare)	আমালৈ (amaloi)	আমাত (amat)
2nd person	sg.	inferior			তই (toi, you)	—	তো- (tü-)	তোক (tük)	তোৰ (tür)	তোৰে (türe)	তোলৈ (tüloi)	তোত (tüt)
2nd person	sg.	very familiar			তই (toi, you)	—	তো- (tü-)	তোক (tük)	তোৰ (tür)	তোৰে (türe)	তোলৈ (tüloi)	তোত (tüt)
2nd person	sg.	familiar			তুমি (tumi, you)	—	তোমা- (tüma-)	তোমাক- (tümak)	তোমাৰ (tümar)	তোমাৰে (tümare)	তোমালৈ (tümaloi)	তোমাত (tümat)
2nd person	sg.	honorific			আপুনি (apuni, you)	—	আপোনা- (apüna-)	আপোনাক (apünak)	আপোনাৰ (apünar)	আপোনাৰে (apünare)	আপোনালৈ (apünaloi)	আপোনাত (apünat)
2nd person	pl. (Note: All the plural pronouns except আমি (ami, we) are formed by adding plural suffixes. The suffixes are -হঁত (-hõt) for very familiar and familiar, and -লোক (-lük), -সকল (-xokol) for familiar or honorific.: -হঁত (-hõt): তই (toi) (Note: you (very familiar, singular)) > তহঁত (tohõt) (Note: you (very familiar, plural)) (not *তোহঁত *tühõt) সি (xi) > সিহঁত (xihõt), তাহঁত (tahõt): -লোক (-lük) is added to the oblique forms: তুমি (tumi) (Note: you (familiar, singular)) > তোমালোক (tümalük) (Note: you (familiar, plural)) আপুনি (apuni) (Note: you (honorific, singular)) > আপোনালোক (apünalük) (Note: you (honorific, plural)): -সকল (-xokol) is added with one pronoun only. It can be replaced by -লোক (-lük).; তেখেত (tekhet) (Note: he/she (honorific, singular)) > তেখেতসকল (tekhetxokol) (Note: he/she (honorific, plural)))	inferior			তহঁত (tohõt, you)	তহঁতে (tohõte)	—	তহঁতক (tohõtok)	তহঁতৰ (tohõtor)	তহঁতৰে (tohõtore)	তহঁতলৈ (tohõtoloi)	তহঁতত (tohõtot)
2nd person	pl.	very familiar			তহঁত (tohõt, you)	তহঁতে (tohõte)	—	তহঁতক (tohõtok)	তহঁতৰ (tohõtor)	তহঁতৰে (tohõtore)	তহঁতলৈ (tohõtoloi)	তহঁতত (tohõtot)
2nd person	pl.	familiar			তোমালোক (tümalük, you)	তোমালোকে (tümalüke)	—	তোমালোকক (tümalükok)	তোমালোকৰ (tümalükor)	তোমালোকৰে (tümalükore)	তোমালোকলৈ (tümalükoloi)	তোমালোকত (tümalükot)
2nd person	pl.	honorific			আপোনালোক (apünalük, you)	আপোনালোকে (apünalüke)	—	আপোনালোকক (apünalükok)	আপোনালোকৰ (apünalükor)	আপোনালোকৰে (apünalükore)	আপোনালোকলৈ (apünalükoloi)	আপোনালোকত (apünalükot)
3rd person	sg.	non hon.	prox.	m.	ই (i, he)	—	ইয়া- (ia-)	ইয়াক (iak)	ইয়াৰ (iar)	ইয়াৰে (iare)	ইয়ালৈ (ialoi)	ইয়াত (iat)
3rd person	sg.	non hon.	prox.	f.	এই (ëi, she)	—	—	এইক (ëik)	এইৰ (ëir)	এইৰে (ëire)	এইলৈ (ëiloei)	এইত (ëit)
3rd person	sg.	non hon.	dist.	m.	সি (xi, he)	—	তা- (ta-)	তাক (tak)	তাৰ (tar)	তাৰে (tare)	তালৈ (taloi)	তাত (tat)
3rd person	sg.	non hon.	dist.	f.	তাই (tai, she)	—	—	তাইক (taik)	তাইৰ (tair)	তাইৰে (taire)	তাইলৈ (tailotai)	তাইত (tait)
3rd person	sg.	honr.	proximal		এওঁ (eü̃) /এখেত (ekhet) (he/she)	— /এখেতে (ekhete)	—	এওঁক (eü̃k) /এখেতক (ekhetok)	এওঁৰ (eü̃r) /এখেতৰ (ekhetor)	এওঁৰে (eü̃re) /এখেতেৰে (ekhetere)	এওঁলৈ (eü̃loi) /এখেতলৈ (ekhetoloi)	এওঁত (eü̃t) /এখেতত (ekhetot)
3rd person	sg.	honr.	distal		তেওঁ (teü̃) /তেখেত (tekhet) (he/she)	— /তেখেতে (tekhete)	—	তেওঁক (teü̃k) /তেখেতক (tekhetok)	তেওঁৰ (teü̃r) /তেখেতৰ (tekhetor)	তেওঁৰে (teü̃re) /তেখেতেৰে (tekhetere)	তেওঁলৈ (teü̃loi) /তেখেতলৈ (tekhetoloi)	তেওঁত (teü̃t) /তেখেতত (tekhetot)
3rd person	pl.	non hon.	proximal	ng.	ইহঁত (ihõt, they)	ইহঁতে (ihõte)	—	ইহঁতক (ihõtok)	ইহঁতৰ (ihõtor)	ইহঁতেৰে (ihõtere)	ইহঁতলৈ (ihõtoloi)	ইহঁতত (ihõtot)
3rd person	pl.	non hon.	proximal	f.	এইহঁত (ëihõt, they)	এইহঁতে (ëihõte)	—	এইহঁতক (ëihõtok)	এইহঁতৰ (ëihõtor)	এইহঁতৰে (ëihõtore)	এইহঁতলৈ (ëihõtoloi)	এইহঁতত (ëihõtot)
3rd person	pl.	non hon.	distal	ng.	সিহঁত (xihõt) /তাহঁত (tahõt) (they)	সিহঁতে (xihõte) /তাহঁত (tahõte)	—	সিহঁতক (xihõtok) /তাহঁত (tahõtok)	সিহঁতৰ (xihõtor) /তাহঁত (tahõtor)	সিহঁতেৰে (xihõtere) /তাহঁতেৰে (tahõtere)	সিহঁতলৈ (xihõtoloi) /তাহঁতলৈ (tahõtoloi)	সিহঁতত (xihõtot) /তাহঁতত (tahõtot)
3rd person	pl.	non hon.	distal	f.	তাইহঁত (taihõt, they)	তাইহঁতে (taihõte)	—	তাইহঁতক (taihõtok)	তাইহঁতৰ (taihõtor)	তাইহঁতৰে (taihõtore)	তাইহঁতলৈ (taihõtoloi)	তাইহঁতত (taihõtot)
3rd person	pl.	honr.	proximal		এওঁলোক (eü̃lük) /এখেতসকল (ekhetxokol) (they)	এওঁলোকে (eü̃lüke) /এখেতসকলে (ekhetxokole)	—	এওঁলোকক (eü̃lükok) /এখেতসকলক (ekhetxokolok)	এওঁলোকৰ (eü̃lükor) /এখেতসকলৰ (ekhetxokolor)	এওঁলোকৰে (eü̃lükore) /এখেতসকলেৰে (ekhetxokolere)	এওঁলোকলৈ (eü̃lükoloi) /এখেতসকললৈ (ekhetxokololoi)	এওঁলোকত (eü̃lükot) /এখেতসকলত (ekhetxokolot)
3rd person	pl.	honr.	distal		তেওঁলোক (teü̃lük) /তেখেতসকল (tekhetxokol) (they)	তেওঁলোকে (teü̃lüke) /তেখেতসকলে (tekhetxokole)	—	তেওঁলোকক (teü̃lükok) /তেখেতসকলক (tekhetxokolok)	তেওঁলোকৰ (teü̃lükor) /তেখেতসকলৰ (tekhetxokolor)	তেওঁলোকৰে (teü̃lükore) /তেখেতসকলেৰে (tekhetxokolere)	তেওঁলোকলৈ (teü̃lükoloi) /তেখেতসকললৈ (tekhetxokololoi)	তেওঁলোকত (teü̃lükot) /তেখেতসকলত (tekhetxokolot)

=== Demonstratives ===
The demonstrative pronouns share most of the characteristics with personal pronouns. They are different from the personal sub-class with regard to the feature of demonstration. The personal demonstratives are already given in the previous table (see 3rd person). Therefore only the common demonstratives are given here. Apart from the 2 types of pronounce for proximity found in 3rd person pronouns, the common demonstrative pronouns have a 3rd one, far distal.

× = no forms

— = same as absolutive

Common demonstrative pronouns
relative distance from the speaker →
proximal	distal	far distal
ëia (this/these)	xëia (that/those)	xöua (that/those)
ëi- (this/these)	xëi- (that/those)	xöu- (that/those)
i (this/these)	xi (that/those)	xöu (that/those)

The common demonstratives ëia, xëia and xöua are absolute words. They are invariable and bear no formal distinction of number, gender and status. Their use is restricted to the subject and complement functions only. The rest of the common demonstratives are found forms. They can be used only after they are inflected for the determinative affixes (or words) that function as their classifier.

== Nouns ==
=== Classifiers ===
Assamese has a large collection of classifiers, which are used extensively for different kinds of objects, acquired from the Sino-Tibetan languages. A few examples of the most extensive and elaborate use of classifiers are given below:

- "zɔn" is used to signify a person, male with some amount of respect
  - E.g., manuh-zɔn – "the man"
- "zɔni" (female) is used after a noun or pronoun to indicate human beings
  - E.g., manuh-zɔni – "the woman"
- "zɔni" is also used to express the non-human feminine
  - E.g., sɔɹai zɔni – "the bird", pɔɹuwa-zɔni – "the ant"
- "zɔna" and "gɔɹaki" are used to express high respect for both man and woman
  - E.g., kɔbi-zɔna – "the poet", gʊxaɪ-zɔna – "the goddess", rastrapati-gɔɹaki – "the president", tiɹʊta-gɔɹaki – "the woman"
- "tʊ" has three forms: tʊ, ta, ti
  - (a) tʊ: is used to specify something, although the case of someone, e.g., loɹa-tʊ – "the particular boy", is impolite
  - (b) ta: is used only after numerals, e.g., ɛta, duta, tinita – "one, two, three"
  - (c) ti: is the diminutive form, e.g., kesua-ti – "the infant, besides expressing more affection or attachment to
- "kɔsa", "mɔtʰa" and "taɹ" are used for things in bunches
  - E.g., sabi-kɔsa – "the bunch of key", saul-mɔtʰa – "a handful of rice", suli-taɹi or suli kɔsa – "the bunch of hair"
- dal, dali, are used after nouns to indicate something long but round and solid
  - E.g., bãʱ-dal – "the bamboo", katʰ-dal – "the piece of wood", bãʱ-dali – "the piece of bamboo"

Assamese Classifiers
Classifier	Referent	Examples
/zɔn/	males (adult)	manuh-zɔn (the man – honorific)
/zɔni/	females (women as well as animals)	manuh-zɔni (the woman), sɔrai-zɔni (the bird)
/zɔna/	honorific	kobi-zɔna (the poet), gʊxai-zɔna (the god/goddess)
/ɡɔɹaki/	males and females (honorific)	manuh-ɡɔɹaki (the woman), rastrɔpɔti-gɔɹaki (the president)
/tʊ/	inanimate objects or males of animals and men (impolite)	manuh-tʊ (the man – diminutive), gɔɹu-tʊ (the cow)
/ti/	inanimate objects or infants	kesua-ti (the baby)
/ta/	for counting numerals	e-ta (count one), du-ta (count two)
/kʰɔn/	flat square or rectangular objects, big or small, long or short	
/kʰɔni/	terrain like rivers and mountains	
/tʰupi/	small objects	
/zak/	group of people, cattle; also for rain; cyclone	
/sati/	breeze	
/pat/	objects that are thin, flat, wide or narrow.	
/paɦi/	flowers	
/sɔta/	objects that are solid	
/kɔsa/	mass nouns	
/mɔtʰa/	bundles of objects	
/mutʰi/	smaller bundles of objects	
/taɹ/	broomlike objects	
/ɡɔs/	wick-like objects	
/ɡɔsi/	with earthen lamp or old style kerosene lamp used in Assam	
/zʊpa/	objects like trees and shrubs	
/kʰila/	paper and leaf-like objects	
/kʰini/	uncountable mass nouns and pronouns	
/dal/	inanimate flexible/stiff or oblong objects; humans (pejorative)	

In Assamese, classifiers are generally used in the numeral + classifier + noun (e.g. /ezɔn manuh/ ejon manuh 'one man') or the noun + numeral + classifier (e.g. /manuh ezɔn/ manuh ejon 'one man') forms.

=== Nominalization ===
Most verbs can be converted into nouns by the addition of the suffix /ɔn/. For example, /kʰa/ ('to eat') can be converted to /kʰaɔn/ khaon ('good eating').

=== Grammatical cases ===
Assamese has 8 grammatical cases:

Cases	Suffix	Example
Absolutive	none	বাৰীত গৰু সোমাল। barit góru- xwmal. garden-LOC cattle-ABS entered Cattles entered into the garden.
Ergative	-এ, -ই -e, -i	গৰুৱে ঘাঁহ খায়। góru-e ghãh kha-e. cattle-ERG grass-ACC eat-3.HAB.PRES; Cattles eat grass. Note: The personal pronouns without a plural or other suffix are not marked.
Accusative	-(অ)ক, − -(o)k, −	শিয়ালটোৱে শহাটোক খেদি আছে। xial-tw-e xoha-tw-k khedi ase. jackal-the-ERG hare-the-ACC chasing exist-3.PRES.CONT; The jackal is chasing the hare. তেওঁলোকে চোৰটো পুলিচক গতালে। tewlwk-e sür-tw- pulis-ok gotale. they thief-the-ACC police-ACC handover-REC-3; They handed over the thief to the police.
Genitive	-(অ)ৰ -(o)r	তাইৰ ঘৰ tai-r ghor she-GEN house Her house
Dative	-(অ)লৈ [dialectal: -(অ)লে]; -(অ)ক -(o)lói [dialectal: -(o)le]; -(o)k	সি পঢ়াশালিলৈ গৈ আছে। xi porhaxali-lói gói ase. he school-DAT going exist-3.PRES.CONT; He is going to (the) school. বাক চাবিটো দিয়া। ba-k sabi-tw- dia. {elder sister}-DAT key-the-ACC give-FAM.IMP; Give elder sister the key.
Terminative	-(অ)লৈকে [dialectal: -(অ)লেকে] -(o)lóike [dialectal: -(o)leke]	মই নহালৈকে কʼতো নেযাবা। moi n-oha-lóike kót-w ne-ja-b-a. I not-coming-TERM where-even not-go-future-3 Don't go anywhere until I don't come. ১ৰ পৰা ৭লৈকে 1-or pora 7-olóike one-GEN from seven-TERM; From 1 up to 7
Instrumental	-(এ)ৰে [dialectal: -(এ)দি] -(e)re [dialectical: -(e)di]	কলমেৰে লিখিছিলা। kolom-ere likhisila. pen-INS write-2.DP; You wrote with (a) pen.
Locative	-(অ)ত [sometimes: -এ] -(o)t [sometimes: -e]	সি বহীখনত লিখিছে। xi bóhi-khon-ot likhise. he notebook-the-LOC write-PRES.PERF.3; He has written on the notebook. আইতা মঙলবাৰে আহিছিল। aita moŋolbar-e ahisil. grandmother Tuesday-LOC come-DP-3; Grandmother came on Tuesday.

== Verbs ==
=== Negation process ===
Verbs in Assamese are negated by adding /n/ before the verb, with /n/ picking up the initial vowel of the verb. For example:

- /na laɡɛ/ 'do(es) not want' (1st, 2nd and 3rd persons)
- /ni likʰʊ̃/ 'will not write' (1st person)
- /nukutʊ̃/ 'will not nibble' (1st person)
- /nɛlɛkʰɛ/ 'does not count' (3rd person)
- /nɔkɔɹɔ/ 'do not do' (2nd person)

=== Tense ===
With consonant ending verb likh (write) and vowel ending verb kha (eat, drink, consume).

Stem	Likh (write)	Kha (eat, drink, consume)
Gerund	Likha	khüa
Causative	Likha	khüa
Conjugative	Likhi	Khai & Kha
Infinitive	Likhibo	Khabo
Goal	Likhibólói	Khabólói
Terminative	Likhibólóike	Khabólóike
Agentive	Likhü̃ta ^{np}/Likhwra ^{mi}/Likhwri ^{fi}	Khawta ^{np}/Khawra ^{mi}/Khawri ^{fi}
Converb	Likhü̃te	Khaü̃te
Progressive	Likhü̃te likhü̃te	Khaü̃te khaü̃te
Reason	Likhat	Khüat
	Likhilot	Khalot
Conditional	Likhile	Khale
Perfective	Likhi	Khai
Habitual	Likhi likhi	Khai khai

For different types of verbs.

Tense	Person	tho "put"		kha "consume"		pi "drink"		de "give"		dhu "wash"		kor "do"		randh "cook"		ah "come"	
Tense	Person	+	-	+	-	+	-	+	-	+	-	+	-	+	-	+	-
Simple Present	1st per.	thoü	nothoü	khaü	nakhaü ~ nekhaü	piü	nipiü	diü	nidiü	dhüü	nüdhüü	korü	nokorü	randhü	narandhü ~ nerandhü	ahü	nahü
Simple Present	2nd per. inf.	thoo	nothoo	khao	nakhao ~ nekhao	pio	nipio	dio	nidio	dhüo	nüdhüo	koro	nokoro	randho	narandho ~ nerandho	aho	naho
Simple Present	2nd per. pol.	thüa	nüthüa	khüa	nükhüa	pia	nipia	dia	nidia	dhüa	nüdhüa	kora	nokora	randha	narandha ~ nerandha	aha	naha
Simple Present	2nd per. hon. & 3rd per.	thoe	nothoe	khae	nakhae ~ nekhae	pie	nipie	die	nidie	dhüe	nüdhüe	kore	nokore	randhe	narandhe ~ nerandhe	ahe	nahe
Present continuous	1st per.	thói asü	thoi thoka nai	khai asü	khai thoka nai	pi asu	pi thoka nai	di asü	di thoka nai	dhui asü	dhui thoka nai	kori asü	kóri thoka nai	randhi asü	randhi thoka nai	ahi asü	ahi thoka nai
Present continuous	2nd per. inf.	thoi aso	thoi thoka nai	khai aso	khai thoka nai	pi aso	pi thoka nai	di aso	di thoka nai	dhui aso	dhui thoka nai	kori aso	kóri thoka nai	randhi aso	randhi thoka nai	ahi aso	ahi thoka nai
Present continuous	2nd per. pol.	thoi asa	thoi thoka nai	khai asa	khai thoka nai	pi asa	pi thoka nai	di asa	di thoka nai	dhui asa	dhui thoka nai	kori asa	kóri thoka nai	randhi asa	randhi thoka nai	ahi asa	ahi thoka nai
Present continuous	2nd per. hon. & 3rd per.	thoi ase	thoi thoka nai	khai ase	khai thoka nai	pi ase	pi thoka nai	di ase	di thoka nai	dhui ase	dhui thoka nai	kori ase	kóri thoka nai	randhi ase	randhi thoka nai	ahi ase	ahi thoka nai
Present Perfect	1st per.	thoisü	thüa nai	khaisü	khwa nai	pisü	pia nai	disü	dia nai	dhui asü	dhwa nai	korisü	kora nai	randhisü	rondha nai	ahi asü	oha nai
Present Perfect	2nd per. inf.	thóisó	thüa nai	khaisó	khwa nai	pisó	pia nai	disó	dia nai	dhuisó	dhwa nai	kórisó	kora nai	randhisó	rondha nai	ahisó	oha nai
Present Perfect	2nd per. pol.	thoisa	thüa nai	khaisa	khwa nai	pisa	pia nai	disa	dia nai	dhuisa	dhwa nai	korisa	kora nai	randhisa	rondha nai	ahisa	oha nai
Present Perfect	2nd per. hon. & 3rd per.	thoise	thüa nai	khaise	khwa nai	pise	pia nai	dise	dia nai	dhuise	dhwa nai	korise	kora nai	randhise	rondha nai	ahise	oha nai
Recent Past	1st per.	thólü	nothólü	khalü	nakhalü ~ nekhalü	pilü	nipilü	dilü	nidilü	dhulü	nudhulü	korilü	nokórilü	randhilü	narandhilü ~ nerandhilü	ahilü	nahilü
Recent Past	2nd per. inf.	thóli	nothóli	khali	nakhali ~ nekhali	pili	nipili	dili	nidili	dhuli	nudhuli	kórili	nókórili	randhili	narandhili ~ nerandhili	ahilü	nahilü
Recent Past	2nd per. pol.	thóla	nothóla	khala	nakhala ~ nekhala	pila	nipila	dila	nidila	dhula	nudhula	kórila	nókórila	randhila	narandhila ~ nerandhila	ahila	nahila
Recent Past	2nd per. hon. & 3rd per.	thóle	nothóle	khale	nakhale ~ nekhale	pile	nipile	dile	nidile	dhule	nudhule	kórile	nókórile	randhile	narandhile ~ nerandhile	ahile / ahil^{tr}	nahile / nahil^{tr}
Distant Past	1st per.	thoisilü	nothoisilü ~ thüa nasilü	khaisilü	nakhaisilü ~ nekhaisilü ~ khwa nasilü	pisilü	nipisilü ~ pia nasilü	disilü	nidisilü ~ dia nasilü	dhuisilü	nudhuisilü ~ dhüa nasilü	kórisilü	nókórisilü ~ kora nasilü	randhisilü	narandhisilü ~ nerandhisilü ~ rondha nasilü	ahisilü	nahisilü ~ oha nasilü
Distant Past	2nd per. inf.	thoisili	nothóisili ~ thüa nasili	khaisili	nakhaisili ~ nekhaisili ~ khwa nasili	pisili	nipisili ~ pia nasili	disili	nidisili ~ dia nasili	dhuisili	nudhuisili ~ dhwa nasili	korisili	nokorisili ~ kora nasili	randhisili	narandhisili ~ nerandhisili ~ rondha nasili	ahisili	nahisili ~ oha nasili
Distant Past	2nd per. pol.	thoisila	nothóisila ~ thüa nasila	khaisila	nakhaisila ~ nekhaisila ~ khüa nasila	pisila	nipisila ~ pia nasila	disila	nidisila ~ dia nasila	dhuisila	nudhuisila ~ dhwa nasila	korisila	nokorisila ~ kora nasila	randhisila	narandhisila ~ nerandhisila ~ rondha nasila	ahisila	nahisila ~ oha nasila
Distant Past	2nd per. hon. & 3rd per.	thoisile	nothoisile ~ thüa nasile	khaisile	nakhaisile ~ nekhaisile ~ khwa nasile	pisile	nipisile ~ pia nasile	disile	nidisile ~ dia nasile	dhuisile	nudhuisile ~ dhüa nasile	korisile	nokorisile ~ kora nasile	randhisile	narandhisile ~ nerandhisile ~ rondha nasile	ahisile	nahisile ~ oha nasile
Past continuous	1st per.	thoi asilü	thoi thoka nasilü	khai asilü	khai thoka nasilü	pi asilü	pi thoka nasilü	di asilü	di thoka nasilü	dhui asils	dhui thoka nasils	kori asils	kori thoka nasils	randhi asils	randhi thoka nasils	ahi asils	ahi thoka nasils
Past continuous	2nd per. inf.	thoi asili	thoi thoka nasili	khai asili	khai thoka nasili	pi asili	pi thoka nasili	di asili	di thoka nasili	dhui asili	dhui thoka nasili	kori asili	kori thoka nasili	randhi asili	randhi thoka nasili	ahi asili	ahi thoka nasili
Past continuous	2nd per. pol.	thoi asila	thoi thoka nasila	khai asila	khai thoka nasila	pi asila	pi thoka nasila	di asila	di thoka nasila	dhui asila	dhui thoka nasila	kori asila	kori thoka nasila	randhi asila	randhi thoka nasila	ahi asila	ahi thoka nasila
Past continuous	2nd per. hon. & 3rd per.	thoi asil(e)	thoi thoka nasil(e)	khai asil(e)	khai thoka nasil(e)	pi asil(e)	pi thoka nasil(e)	di asil(e)	di thoka nasil(e)	dhui asil(e)	dhui thoka nasil(e)	kori asil(e)	kori thoka nasil(e)	randhi asil(e)	randhi thoka nasil(e)	ahi asil{e)	ahi thoka nasil(e)
Simple Future	1st per.	thóm	nothóm	kham	nakham ~ nekham	pim	nipim	dim	nidim	dhum	nudhum	korim	nokorim	randhim	narandhim ~ nerandhim	ahim	nahim
Simple Future	2nd per. inf.	thóbi	nothóbi	khabi	nakhabi ~ nekhabi	pibi	nipibi	dibi	nidibi	dhubi	nudhubi	koribi	nokoribi	randhibi	narandhibi ~ nerandhibi	ahibi	nahibi
Simple Future	2nd per. pol.	thóba	nothóba	khaba	nakhaba ~ nekhaba	piba	nipiba	diba	nidiba	dhuba	nudhuba	koriba	nókóriba	randhiba	narandhiba ~ nerandhiba	ahiba	nahiba
Simple Future	2nd per. hon. & 3rd per.	thóbo	nothóbo	khabo	nakhabo ~ nekhabo	pibo	nipibo	dibo	nidibo	dhubo	nudhubo	koribo	nokoribo	randhibo	narandhibo ~ nerandhibo	ahibo	nahibo
Future continuous	1st per.	thoi thakim	thoi nathakim/nethakim	khai thakim	khai nathakim/nethakim	pi thakim	pi nathakim/nethakim	di thakim	di nathakim/nethakim	dhui thakim	dhui nathakim/nethakim	kori thakim	kori nathakim/nethakim	randhi thakim	randhi nathakim/nethakim	ahi thakim	ahi nathakim/nethakim
Future continuous	2nd per. inf.	thoi thakibi	thoi nathakibi/nethakibi	khai thakibi	khai nathakibi/nethakibi	pi thakibi	pi nathakibi/nethakibi	di thakibi	di nathakibi/nethakibi	dhui thakibi	dhui nathakibi/nethakibi	kori thakibi	kori nathakibi/nethakibi	randhi thakibi	randhi nathakibi/nethakibi	ahi thakibi	ahi nathakibi/nethakibi
Future continuous	2nd per. pol.	thoi thakiba	thoi nathakiba/nethakiba	khai thakiba	khai nathakiba/nethakiba	pi thakiba	pi nathakiba/nethakiba	di thakiba	di nathakiba/nethakiba	dhui thakiba	dhui nathakiba/nethakiba	kori thakiba	kori nathakiba/nethakiba	randhi thakiba	randhi nathakiba/nethakiba	ahi thakiba	ahi nathakiba/nethakiba
Future continuous	2nd per. hon. & 3rd per.	thoi thakibo	thoi nathakibo/nethakibo	khai thakibo	khai nathakibo/nethakibo	pi thakibo	pi nathakibo/nethakibo	di thakibo	di nathakibo/nethakibo	dhui thakibo	dhui nathakibo/nethakibo	kori thakibo	kori nathakibo/nethakibo	randhi thakibo	randhi nathakibo/nethakibo	ahi thakibo	ahi nathakibo/nethakibo

The negative forms are n + 1st vowel of the verb + the verb. Example: Moi porhw, Moi noporhw (I read, I do not read); Tumi khelila, Tumi nekhelila (You played, You didn't play). For verbs that start with a vowel, just the n- is added, without vowel lengthening. In some dialects if the 1st vowel is a in a verb that starts with consonant, ne is used, like, Moi nakhaw (I don't eat) is Moi nekhaü. In past continuous the negative form is -i thoka nasil-. In future continuous it's -i na(/e)thaki-. In present continuous and present perfect, just -i thoka nai and -a nai' respectively are used for all personal pronouns. Sometimes for plural pronouns, the -hok suffix is used, like korwhok (we do), ahilahok (you guys came).

== See also ==
- Meitei grammar

== Sources ==
- Bhattacharjya, Manmee (2014). Case in Assamese (PhD). The English and foreign languages university. hdl:10603/210828.
- Goswami, G. C.; Tamuli, Jyotiprakash (2003). "Asamiya". In Cardona, George; Jain, Dhanesh (eds.). The Indo-Aryan languages. Routledge. pp. 391–443. ISBN 978-0-7007-1130-7.
- Kalita, Jagat Chandra (2003). Nouns and nominalisations in Assamese (PhD). Abhayapuri college. hdl:10603/66641.
- Kommaluri, Vijayanand; Subramanian, R.; Sagar K, Anand (2005). "Issues in Morphological Analysis of North-East Indian Languages". Language in India. 5.
- Moral, Dipankar (1997). "North-East India as a Linguistic Area" (PDF). Mon-Khmer Studies. 27: 43–53.
