= Chasnud-e Payan =

- Location in Afghanistan
- Coordinates: 37°55′19″N 71°17′22″E
- Country: Afghanistan
- Province: Badakhshan Province
- District: Shighnan
- Time zone: + 4.30

Chasnud-e Payan is a village in Badakhshan Province in north-eastern Afghanistan, located at the confluence of the Chashnud Dara and the Panj River.
