= Oroshoris =

Iranian people of Pamiri ethnic group

Total population
- 2,000 (est.)

Regions with significant populations
- Gorno-Badakhshan (Tajikistan)

Languages
- Oroshori, Russian, Tajik

Related ethnic groups
- other Iranian peoples

Oroshori, or Roshorvi are Iranian peoples of the Pamir group who are native to the Gorno-Badakhshan Autonomous Region of eastern Tajikistan. A 1972 estimate put the population of the Oroshoris at around 2,000.

== Language ==
The Oroshori language is a dialect of Shughni. Linguistically, Oroshori has close affinities towards the Bartangi and Sarikoli language although it's more closely related to the former. Due to the Oroshoris' proximity to Kirghiz groups, there is evidence of mutual linguistic influence.
