= Shighnan =

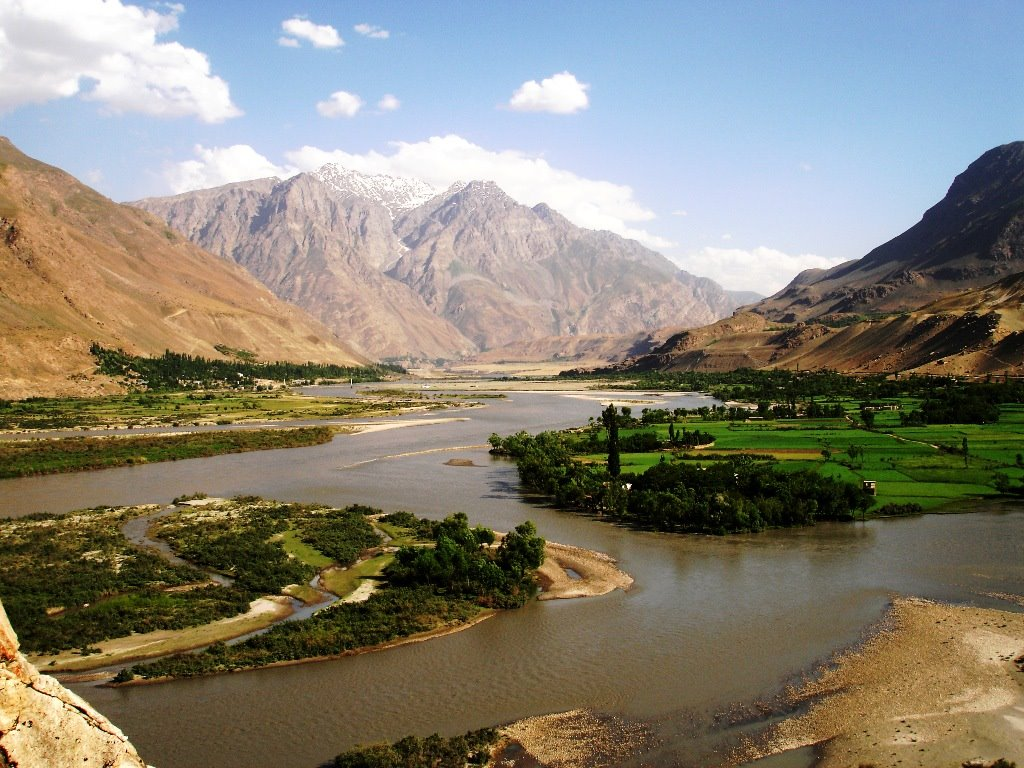
- The Panj river at the border

- Location in Afghanistan Location near Tajikistan
- Coordinates: 37°37′0″N 71°27′0″E
- Country: Afghanistan
- Province: Badakhshan
- Districts: Shighnan
- Elevation: 7,503 ft (2,287 m)

Population
  - Total: 24,000
- Time zone: UTC+4:30

Shighnan, also Shignan, Shugnan, Shughnan, and Khughnan (Tajik: Шуғнон, Dari: شغنان, Shughni: خُږنۈن, Хуг̌ну̊н, Xuɣ̌nůn), is an historic region whose name today may also refer to a town and a district in Badakhshan Province in the mountainous northeast of Afghanistan and also a district in Gorno-Badakhshan Autonomous Province in Tajikistan. The administrative center of the Shighnan District of Afghanistan is called Qaleh Barpanjeh (قلعه برپنجه). The administrative center of the Shughnon District of Tajikistan is called Khorogh.

The Afghan Rushan (Rushan is also a separate district in Tajikistan) falls under the administrative rule of Shughnan district, and is referred to as Rushan sub-district (i.e. Rushan Alaqadari). There are about ten sizable and many more smaller villages in the Shughnan district of Afghanistan. These villages include, south to north, Darmarakht, Wiyod, Wiroodhj, Bashor, Vuzh-Pidrudh, Dhishahr, Shidwood, and Tsaghnod. Note; the village names are given as they appear in the local language. Population of the Afghan district totals approximately 24,000 residents. Some of the bigger villages in the Tajik side of Shughnan include, south to north, Darmarakht, Porshnev, Buni, Sokhcharv, and Rosht Qala.

== History ==
In ancient times the area was known for its ruby mines, which are mentioned in the writings of Marco Polo:

It is in this province that those fine and valuable gems the Balas Rubies are found. They are got in certain rocks among the mountains, and in the search for them the people dig great caves underground, just as is done by miners for silver. There is but one special mountain that produces them, and it is called Syghinan.

In modern times Shughnan and its vassal Roshan were states whose rulers, the mirs of Shighnan, claimed descent from Alexander the Great. The archaeologist Marc Aurel Stein wrote: "North of Shughnan lies Roshan, ruled usually by relatives of the old chiefs of Shughnan... there is no proof, however, to their genealogical claims." In 1829 the Mirs of Shughnan were forced to pay tribute to Murad Beg of Kunduz. In 1874 Shughnan was subjugated into Afghanistan, but the mirs still continues to rule the area until September 1883, when Shughnan was annexed by Abdur Rahman Khan. The area was assigned to Russia by the Durand agreement of 1893. In an 1895 agreement between the British and Russia, Moscow agreed to hand over all districts previously occupied by her on the left bank of the Panj, or upper Oxus, to Afghanistan in exchange for lands on the right hand bank in Darvaz. The Russian-controlled half of Shughnan was incorporated into the Gorno-Badakhshan oblast in 1925, which was merged into the newly formed Tajikistan in 1929.

The people residing in the Shughnan district, both the Tajik side and Afghan side of the border, speak their own language called Shughni (Khughnani).

== Climate ==
Shighnan has a humid continental climate (Köppen climate classification Dsb) with dry, mild summers and cold, snowy winters. In winter there is more rainfall than in summer. The average annual temperature in Shighnan is 3.6 °C (38.5 °F). About 782 mm (30.79 in) of precipitation falls annually.

Climate data for Shighnan
Month	Jan	Feb	Mar	Apr	May	Jun	Jul	Aug	Sep	Oct	Nov	Dec	Year
Daily mean °C (°F)	−10.1 (13.8)	−8.4 (16.9)	−2.6 (27.3)	3.8 (38.8)	7.8 (46.0)	12.4 (54.3)	15.9 (60.6)	15.9 (60.6)	11.7 (53.1)	5.5 (41.9)	−1.3 (29.7)	−6.9 (19.6)	3.6 (38.6)
Average precipitation mm (inches)	80.2 (3.16)	112.7 (4.44)	120.6 (4.75)	105.2 (4.14)	97.1 (3.82)	61.2 (2.41)	14.3 (0.56)	5.6 (0.22)	8.6 (0.34)	43.4 (1.71)	72.2 (2.84)	61.8 (2.43)	782.9 (30.82)
Average relative humidity (%)	73	77	79	75	62	52	41	37	35	45	64	70	59
Source 1: ClimateCharts
Source 2: World Weather Online (precipitation & humidity)

== Demography ==
Pamiris such as the Shughnis are the main ethnic group of the region. Pamiri languages primarily Shughni are mainly spoken there.

== See also ==
- Badakhshan Province
