= Transitive alignment =

In linguistic typology, transitive alignment is a type of morphosyntactic alignment used in a small number of languages in which a single grammatical case is used to mark both arguments of a transitive verb, but not with the single argument of an intransitive verb. Such a situation, which is quite rare among the world's languages, has also been called a double-oblique clause structure.

Rushani, an Iranian dialect, has this alignment in the past tense. That is, in the past tense (or perhaps perfective aspect), the agent and object of a transitive verb are marked with the same case ending, while the subject of an intransitive verb is not marked. In the present tense, the object of the transitive verb is marked, the other two roles are not – that is, a typical nominative–accusative alignment.

az-um pa Xaraɣ sut
I(ABS)-1SG to Xorog went
'I went to Xorog'

mu tā wunt
me(OBL) you(OBL) saw
'I saw you' (double oblique: literally 'me saw thee')

az tā wun-um
I(ABS) you(OBL) see-1SG
'I see you' (nominative–accusative)

According to Payne, it's clear what happened here: Rushani once had a split-ergative alignment, as is common in the area, where the object was marked (oblique) in the present tense, but the agent was marked in the past. The case forms of the object were then leveled, and with the marking applied to the past tense as well. However, this resulted in a complication, the typologically unusual situation where the agent and object are treated the same, and different from the intransitive subject. Given its rarity, one might expect such a system to be unstable, and indeed it appears to be changing. Payne reports that younger speakers change the past-tense construction to one of the following, either using the absolutive (= nominative) inflection for the agent:

az-um tā wunt
I(ABS)-1SG you(OBL) saw
'I saw you' (nominative–accusative)

or secondarily marking the object as an object, using the preposition az (literally 'from'):

mu az taw wunt
I(OBL) ACC you(OBL) saw
'I saw you' (effectively, accusative and double-accusative)

== See also ==
- Nominative–accusative alignment
- Ergative–absolutive alignment
- Active–stative alignment
- Direct–inverse alignment
