= Shighnan District =

Shighnan District شغنان
- District
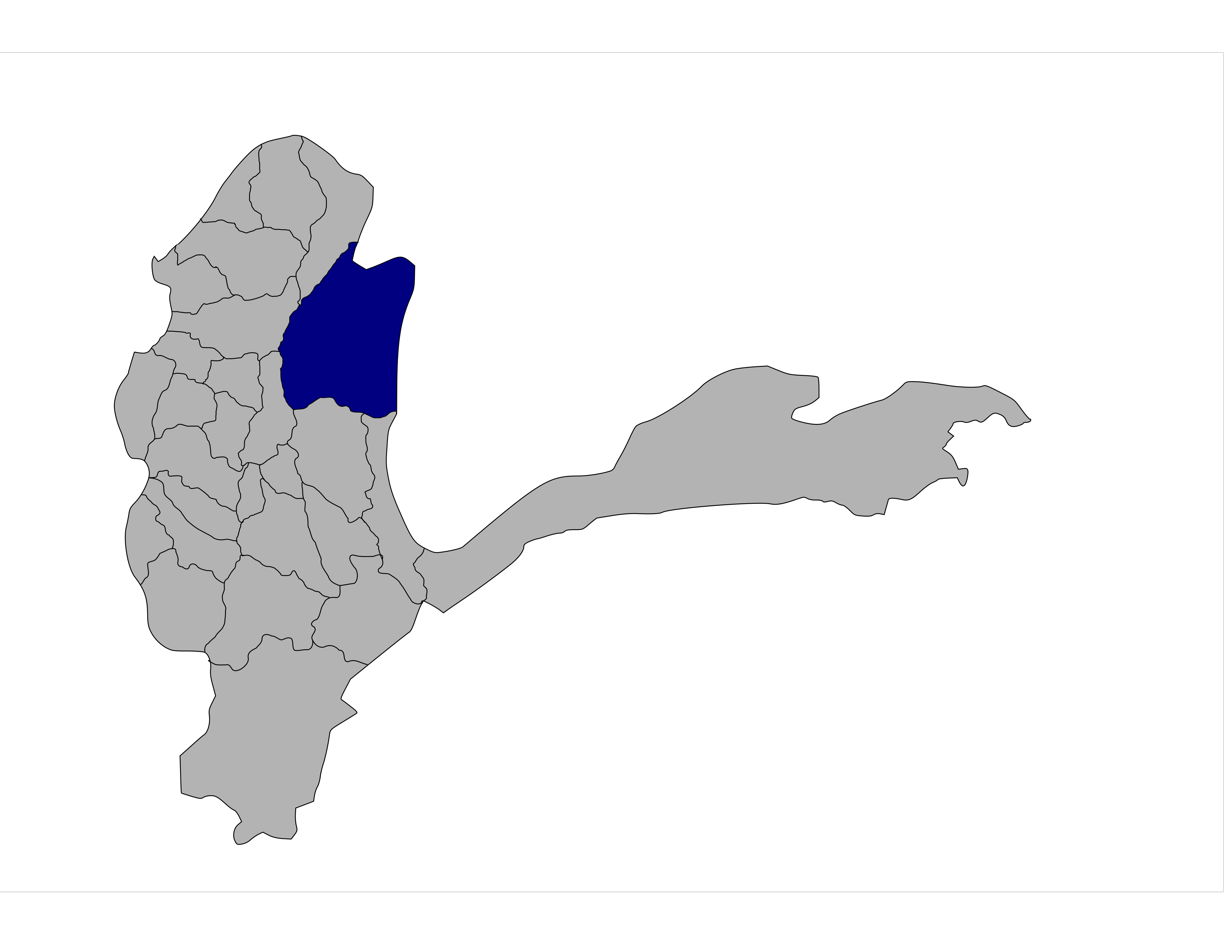

- Location within Afghanistan
- Coordinates: 37°37′0″N 71°27′0″E
- Country: Afghanistan
- Province: Badakhshan
- Capital: Shighnan

Area
  - Land: 1,362 sq mi (3,528 km^{2})

Population
  - Total: 27,750
- Time zone: UTC+4:30

Shighnan District (Dari: ولسوالی شغنان) is one of the 28 districts of the Badakhshan Province in eastern Afghanistan. It is part of the history region of Shighnan that is today divided between Afghanistan and Tajikistan.The district borders the Panj River and Tajikistan in the northeast, the Maimay district to the west, the Raghistan district in the southwest, the Kohistan, Arghanj Khwa, and Shuhada districts in the south, and the Ishkashim district in the southeast.

Lake Shewa is located in Shighnan Valley.

== Demography ==
The Khowar, Tajiks, Khoshey, and Pamiris are the major ethnic groups. Only the Farsi and Shughnani language are spoken.

This District has a population of 27,750

== Villages and places ==
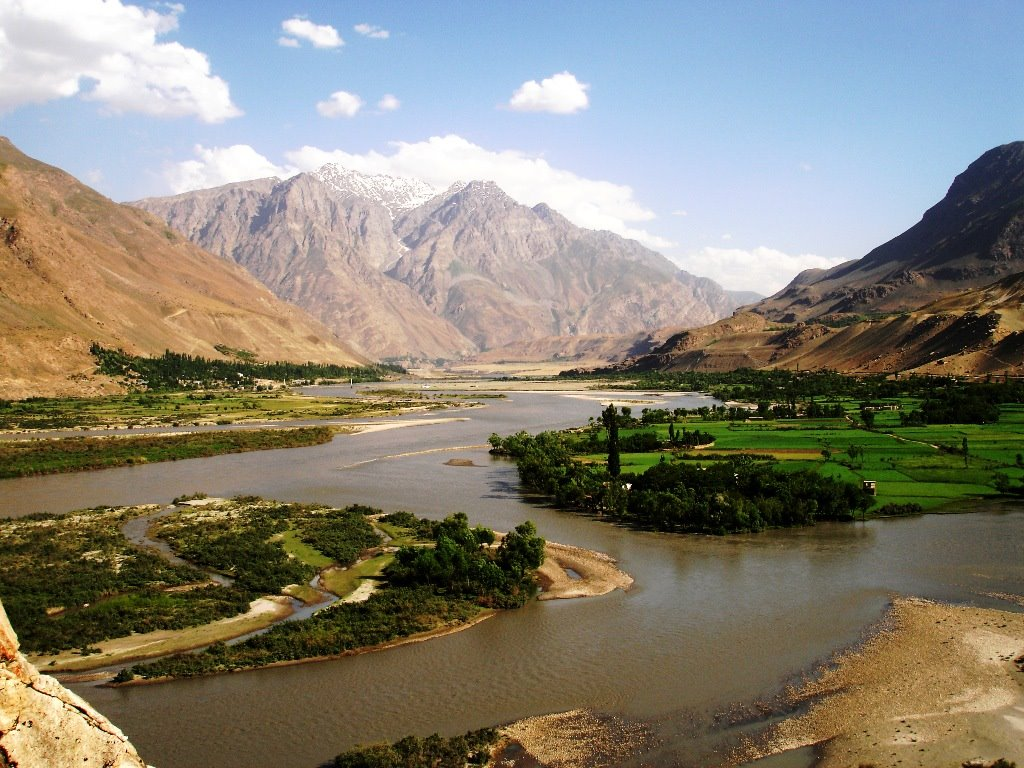
The Panj River, the border between Tajikistan and Afghanistan in the region of Shighnan.

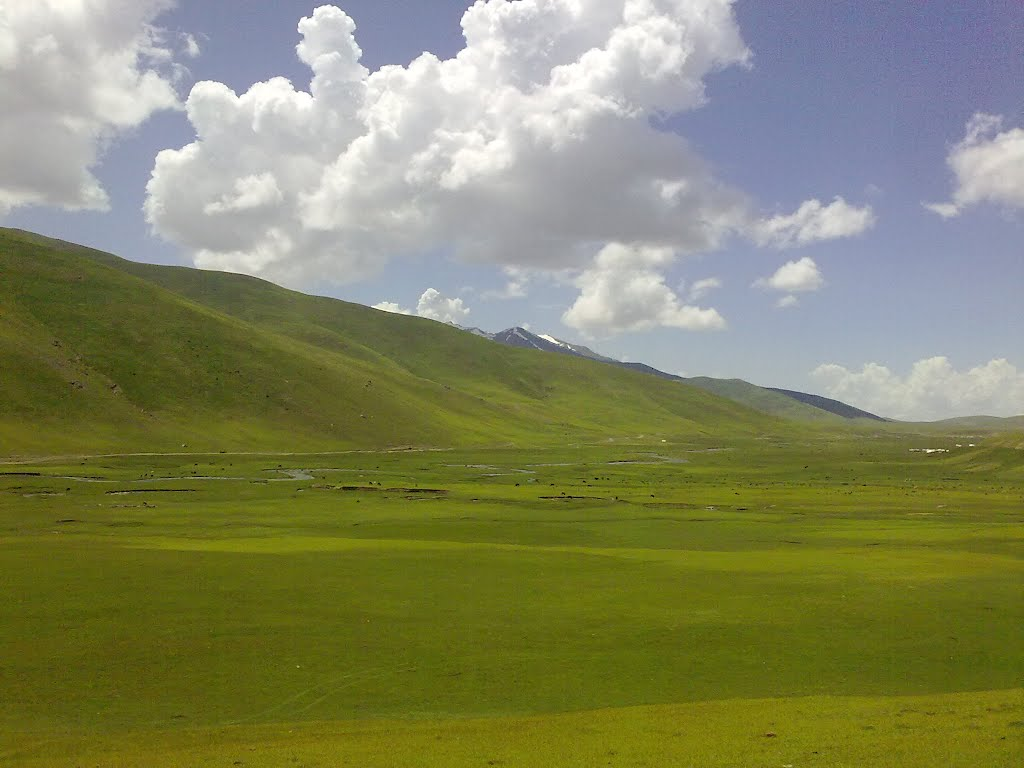
The Shiwa Plain

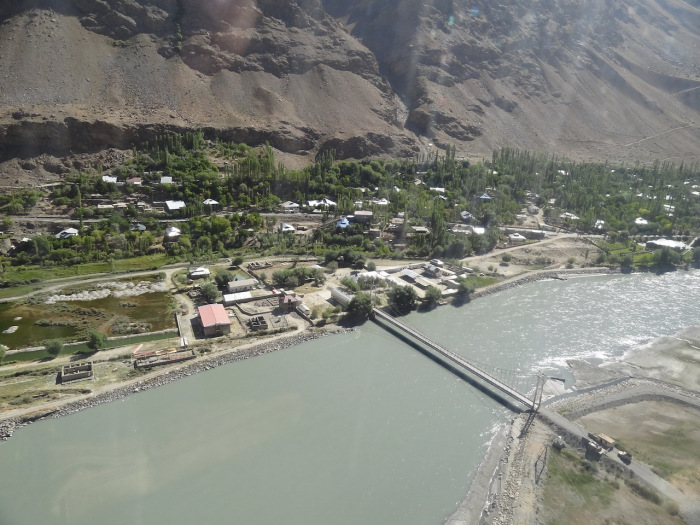
The Friendship Bridge across the Panj
