= Khufi language =

Pamir language of Tajikistan

Khufi
- Xuf ziv
- Native to: Tajikistan
- Native speakers: (800 cited 1990)
- Language family: Indo-European: Indo-Iranian; Iranian; Southeastern Iranian; Shughni-Yazghulami-Munji; Shughni-Yazghulami; Shughni-Sarikoli; Shughni; Rushani-Khufi; Khufi

Official status
- Recognised minority language in: Tajikistan (in Gorno-Badakhshan)

Language codes
- ISO 639-3: –
- Glottolog: khuf1238
- ELP: Khufi

Khufi is a Pamir language spoken in Tajikistan's Gorno-Badakhshan Autonomous Region. It is closely related to Shughni, and is traditionally considered a dialect of it, but it is quite distinct. It is spoken in the villages of Khuf and Pastkhuf in the Khufdara River gorge, a right-hand tributary of Panj that descends from the Rushan Range south of the Bartang River and the town of Rushon.

== See also ==
- Памирские языки in Russian Wikipedia.
