= Bartangi language =

Pamir language of Afghanistan and Tajikistan

Bartangi
- Bartangi ziv
- Native to: Gorno-Badakhshan Autonomous Region
- Ethnicity: Bartangi people
- Native speakers: 3,000 (1990)
- Language family: Indo-European: Indo-Iranian; Iranian; Southeastern Iranian; Shughni-Yazghulami-Munji; Shughni-Yazghulami; Shughni-Sarikoli; Shughni; Bartangi-Oroshori; Bartangi
- Writing system: None

Language codes
- ISO 639-3: (included in Shughni [sgh])
- Glottolog: bart1238
- ELP: Bartangi

The Bartangi language is a Pamir language spoken along the Bartang River from Yemtz to Nikbist, in the Gorno-Badakhshan Autonomous Region of Tajikistan. It is typically classified as a dialect of Rushani, but is quite distinct. Within Bartangi, there are two (sub)dialects, Basid and Sipandzh, which are named after the villages in which they are spoken. It is an unwritten language.

As of 1990, there are between 2,500 and 3,000 speakers of Bartangi. While the population continues to grow, civil war and Soviet efforts to assimilate the Bartangi or move them to cities have caused the language to dwindle. In addition, the popularity of Tajik and Russian as the languages of education and modernization have contributed to the decline of Bartangi.

Bartangi is most similar to Rushani and Oroshori, two neighboring Shughni dialects. Features that distinguish them include the form of the second person, a tu tense in Bartangi, and the Bartangi plural suffix -en.

Ethnologue classifies Bartangi as a dialect of Shughni but adds that it may be a separate language.

== Discovery and decline ==
The language was unknown to Europe until the early twentieth century, when French linguist Robert Gauthiot published his findings on the area in his 1916 essay Notes sur le yazgoulami, dialecte iranien des confins du Pamir. After the discovery of the Bartangi people, there was an increase in interest in the Shughni provinces, but due to the difficult landscape, very few explorers visited the area, and publications on the language dropped off, though in 1924 a Bartangi lullaby was printed.

The next major European involvement in the area was by the Russians, who over the course of the nineteenth century had conquered parts of Tajikistan until its formal declaration as the Tajik Soviet Socialist Republic in 1929. Despite Tajikistan declaring independence in 1991, permanent Russian and Soviet influence in language, culture, and politics as well as the widespread and growing use of the most dominant Iranian language, Tajik, have led to the loss of several Pamir languages. Russian, an Indo-European language and Tajik serve as common languages throughout all Tajik provinces. In addition, with a 96% literacy rate throughout the province, even the isolated region of Bartang is well-versed in the national languages of Russian and Tajik, as well as Uzbek. Russian is currently the language of education and the intelligentsia in Tajikistan, and the influence of these larger languages is required for communication between speakers of the various Pamir languages.

War has also contributed to the substantial decline of the Shughni languages, and Bartangi is no exception. World War II, conflicts between Shughni villages, and the civil war which ravished the province from 1992 to 1997, all contributed to the diminishing status of the language. In addition to wiping out portions of the population, the war forced many of the Pamir inhabitants out of their native lands and into cities, where their languages are of little use. The 1950s also saw massive resettlement of Bartang people, though the population has been increasing since 1959.
