= Shughni language =

Pamir language of Tajikistan, Afghanistan, Pakistan and China

Shughni
- خُږنۈنے زِڤ хуг̌ну̊ни зив xuɣ̌nůni ziv, xuɣ̌ni ziv
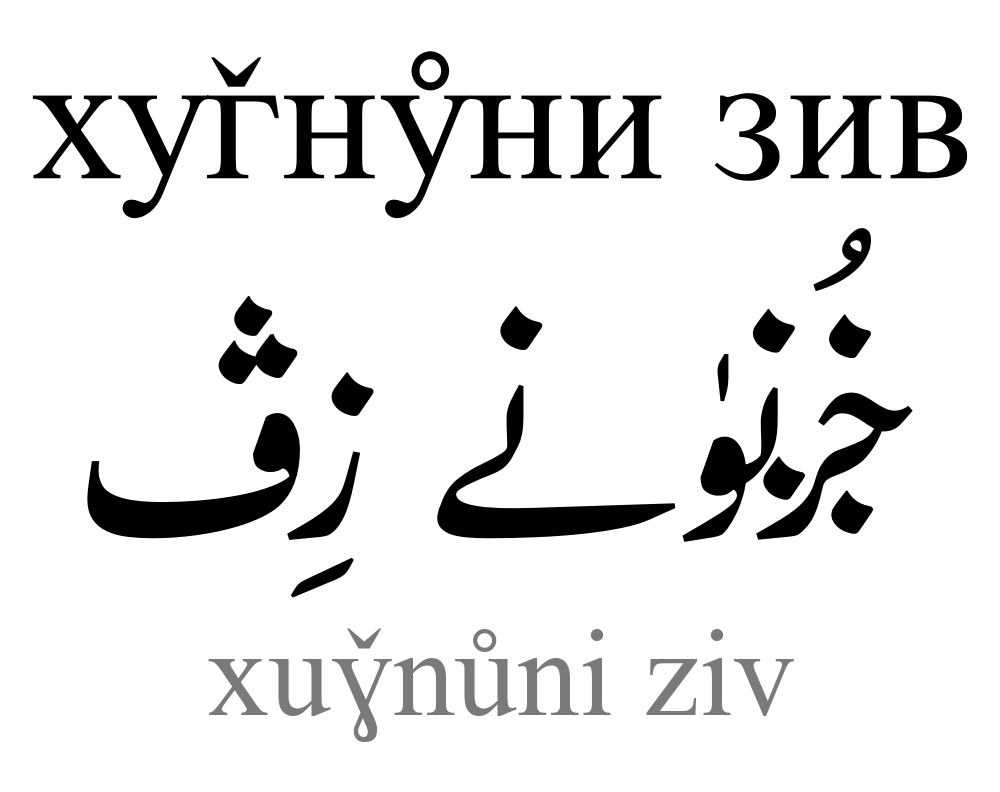
- Native to: Tajikistan, Afghanistan, Pakistan, China
- Ethnicity: Shughnan
- Native speakers: 95,000 (2011)
- Language family: Indo-European: Indo-Iranian; Iranian; Southeastern Iranian; Shughni-Yazghulami-Munji; Shughni-Yazghulami; Shughni-Sarikoli; Shughni
- Dialects: Bartangi-Oroshori; Khughni-Bajui; Rushani-Khufi
- Writing system: Latin, Persian, Cyrillic

Official status
- Recognised minority language in: Tajikistan (in Gorno-Badakhshan), Afghanistan (in Badakhshan)

Language codes
- ISO 639-3: sgh
- Glottolog: shug1248
- ELP: Shughni
- Shughni is classified as Vulnerable by the UNESCO Atlas of the World's Languages in Danger

Shughni (Note: хуг̌ну̊ни зив, خُږنۈنے زِڤ, xuɣ̌nůni ziv; Tajik: шуғнонӣ, Persian: شغنانی) is one of the Pamir languages of the Southeastern Iranian language group. Its distribution is in the Gorno-Badakhshan Autonomous Region in Tajikistan, Badakhshan Province in Afghanistan, Chitral district in Pakistan and Tashkurgan Tajik Autonomous County in China.

Shughni-Rushani tends towards SOV word order, distinguishes a masculine and feminine gender in nouns and some adjectives, as well as the 3rd person singular of verbs. Shughni distinguishes between an absolutive and an oblique case in its system of pronouns. Rushani is noted for a typologically unusual 'double-oblique' construction, also called a 'transitive case', in the past tense. Normally Soviet school scientists consider Rushani as a close but independent language to Shughni, while Western school scientists codes Rushani as a dialect of Shughni due to Afghanistan Rushani speakers living in the Shighnan district of Badakhshan Province.

== Distribution ==
The Shughni people in Tajikistan speak Tajik Persian, while Shughni is mostly used locally in everyday conversation.

Shughni also serves as a secondary, more local lingua franca for communication in the regional capital of the Gorno-Badakhshan Autonomous Region—the city of Khorog—as well as throughout the region and even beyond. In Tajikistan, Shughni is not formally taught in schools, though it may be used unofficially for communication between teachers and students in primary grades.

According to the 1980s data, about 50,000 Shughnis lived in GBAO. As of 1997, approximately 100,000 people spoke Shughni.

Shughni speakers in Afghanistan are mostly monolingual. In Afghanistan, Shughni was unofficially taught in schools, and in the 2010s a Shughni program for primary school students was created.

According to the All-Union Population Census of the USSR in the 1920s, only six people reported Shughni as their native language—for unknown reasons, some ethnic groups, including the Shughni, did not report their language. By the 1980s, about 50,000 Shughni lived in GBAO, and in Afghan Shighnan, according to researcher Dodkhudo Karamshoev, at least 25,000. As of 1997, approximately 100,000 people spoke Shughni. According to Joy Edelman, the number of Shughni speakers ranges from 80,000 to 100,000, while Katja Mueller estimates around 130,000.

The Shughni language is listed in the UNESCO Atlas of the World's Languages in Danger as "vulnerable". On the EGIDS scale, it has a status of 6a, or "vigorous". This means it is used in oral communication in informal settings and learned by children as a native language, despite a relatively small number of speakers, though in many communicative domains (education, culture, and science) it is often displaced by other languages. Therefore, Shughni is currently not endangered, but it may potentially face risk of extinction in the future.

== Dialects ==
Rushani, Bartangi, Oroshori (Roshorvi), Khufi and Shughni proper are considered to be dialects. However, Bartangi and Khufi are quite distinct and may be separate languages.

== Phonology ==
=== Vowels ===
The following are the vowels of Shughni:

Shughni vowels
	Front		Central	Back
Close	i			u
Near-close	ɪ			ʊ
Close-mid	e	ø	(ə)	o
Open-mid	ɛ		(ə)	ɔ
Open	a~æ		ɑ	

Long vowels occur as /aː, eː, iː, oː, uː/.

=== Consonants ===
The following are the consonants of Shughni:

Shughni consonants
		Labial	Dental/ Alveolar		Post- alveolar	Velar	Uvular	Glottal
		Labial	plain	sibilant	Post- alveolar	Velar	Uvular	Glottal
Nasal		m	n			ŋ		
Plosive/ Affricate	voiceless	p	t	t͡s	t͡ʃ	k	q	
Plosive/ Affricate	voiced	b	d	d͡z	d͡ʒ	ɡ		
Fricative	voiceless	f	θ	s	ʃ	x	χ	(h)
Fricative	voiced	v	ð	z	ʒ	ɣ	ʁ	
Approximant			l		j	w		
Rhotic			r					

- /r/ can be realised as a trill [r] or a tap [ɾ].
- Velar sounds /x, ɣ/ can also be realised as more fronted palatal sounds [ç, ʝ].

== Orthography ==
Shughni people live in both Afghanistan and Tajikistan. For the past 100 years, the two countries have had diverging orthographic standards. On either side of the border, Shughni literaturists, being previously an unwritten language, have relied heavily on the existing orthographic standards and conventions in coming up with an orthography for Shughni language.

In Tajikistan, the Persian alphabet was replaced by the Latin alphabet in 1928, and 11 years afterwards in 1939, the Latin alphabet was replaced by the Cyrillic alphabet. The Tajik Cyrillic alphabet is based on Russian orthography, and is similar to that of Uzbek in neighboring Uzbekistan. Thus, the alphabets developed in Tajikistan for the Shughni language, have been Cyrillic and Latin.

In Afghanistan, Dari Persian, with the Persian script, is the literary language of the nation. Pashto language (Eastern Iranian language) too, with its own alphabet, derived from Persian, but with unique features and conventions, is the co-official language of Afghanistan. Thus, the Shughni orthography being developed by literaturists in Afghanistan has been derived from Persian, and additionally borrowing letters from Pashto if needed.

=== Historical development ===
The question of whether the Shughni language possessed an ancient writing system remains a subject of research. The only recorded mention of a possible ancient Shughni script comes from the Chinese traveler Xuanzang in the 7th century CE. In his work Great Tang Records on the Western Regions, he mentions a country called Shiqini, which researchers identify with Shughnan. According to Xuanzang, the writing system of Shiqini was similar to that of the Tocharians, probably referring to the Eastern Iranian Bactrian alphabet.

From the second half of the 19th century, attempts were made to adapt the Persian script for Shughni. Some poetry (e.g., by the poet Mullo Lochin, 1860–1920) and medical or historical works (e.g., by Shohzoda Muhammad) were written in it, but the practice never became widespread.

During the same period, Shughni began to attract scholarly attention. The first Shughni grammar was compiled by the English researcher Robert Shaw in 1877, using a Latin-based transcription with diacritics. In 1883, the Russian scholar D. L. Ivanov produced the first Shughni dictionary; his manuscripts used Cyrillic with additional Latin letters, while the published version employed the Anders Johan Sjögren's Cyrillic alphabet. In the early 20th century, further publications on Shughni appeared, though the language itself remained largely unwritten.

=== Latin alphabet ===
The Latin-based writing system used for the Shughni language comprises 39 letters, combining standard Latin characters with diacritical marks and some additional modified letters adopted from the Hellenic alphabet. Although this alphabet has never been officially standardized, it has been widely employed in academic articles and linguistic studies devoted to the Shughni language and related Eastern Iranian Pamir languages:

Capital letters
A	Ā	B	C	Č	D	Δ	E	Ê	F	G	Ɣ	Ɣ̌	I	Ī	J̌	K	L	M	N	O	P	Q	R	S	Š	T	Θ	U	Ū	Ů	V	W	X	X̌	Y	Z	Ž	Ʒ
Lower case
a	ā	b	c	č	d	δ	e	ê	f	g	ɣ	ɣ̌	i	ī	ǰ	k	l	m	n	o	p	q	r	s	š	t	θ	u	ū	ů	v	w	x	x̌	y	z	ž	ʒ

=== Persian alphabet ===
The process of compiling a Persian derived alphabet for Shughni has been a long and iterative one, over a period starting from 2004, with the publication of the first book on phonology and orthography of Shughni language by Khair Mohammad Haidari.

This was followed by a 2011 publication by Dr. Nur Ali Dost from Montreal-based "Sohravardi Foundation for Iranian Studies", a 2011 compilation by Mazhab Shah Zahoori and two other by Alishah Sabbar and Calgary-based Dr. Khush Nazar Parmerzad.

This led to controversy, correspondence, and collaboration between Shughni literaturists and academics, who over the following years, agreed upon specific set of consonants, and a specific standardized way of representing vowels.

The Afghan government has officially adopted Shughni orthography as well, and the Ministry of Education has created textbooks to be used in Badakhshan Province.

==== Letters ====
Below table demonstrates the 44-letter Persian-derived Shughni alphabet.

Forms				IPA	Cyrillic equivalent	Latin equivalent	Unicode	Notes
Isolated	Final	Medial	Initial	IPA	Cyrillic equivalent	Latin equivalent	Unicode	Notes
آ / ا	ـا	-	آ	[ɔ]	О о	O o	U+0622; U+0627	Vowel phoneme [ɔ] is represented with "آ" when at the beginning of a word, and with "ـا / ا" when in the middle or end of a word.
ا	-		ا	[∅] ([a][ʊ][e~ɪ])	/ А а / И и / У у	‌ - / A a / I i / U u	U+0627	Letter alif at the beginning of a word can serve two functions. First, it precedes vowel letters "اۈ" [ɵ], "او" [u], "ایـ / اي" [i], or "اېـ / اې" [e]. Second, it acts as a vowel carrier for diacritics of the three short vowels of Shughni, "اَ" [a], "اُ" [ʊ], and "اِ" [ɛ~ɪ].
ب	ـب	ـبـ	بـ	[b]	Б б	B b	U+0628	
پ	ـپ	ـپـ	پـ	[p]	П п	P p	U+067e	
ت	ـت	ـتـ	تـ	[t]	Т т	T t	U+062a	
ث	ـث	ـثـ	ثـ	[s]	С с	S s	U+062b	Only used in loanwords. Pronounced as it would be in Dari Persian.
ٿ	ـٿ	ـٿـ	ٿـ	[θ]	Т̌ т̌	Θ θ/ϑ	U+067F	Unique to Shughni, not part of Persian alphabet. While the letter se "ث" represents the phoneme [θ], this new letter has been introduced so that there can be distinguishment between the native sound [θ] and the sound [s] produced by the letter "ث" in loanwords. Some authors have used letter se with a dot underneath "ݑ" or have used the letter se "ث" for both purposes.
ج	ـج	ـجـ	جـ	[d͡ʒ]	Ҷ ҷ	J̌ ǰ	U+062c	
چ	ـچ	ـچـ	چـ	[t͡ʃ]	Ч ч	Č č	U+0686	
ح	ـح	ـحـ	حـ	[∅] ([h])	Ҳ ҳ	H h	U+0686	Only used in loanwords. In most cases, the letter he "ح" is silent.
خ	ـخ	ـخـ	خـ	[x]	Х х	X x	U+062e	
څ	ـڅ	ـڅـ	څـ	[t͡s]	Ц ц	C c	U+0685	Modified letters adopted from Pashto. Similar letters exist in Khowar, Munji, and Wakhi orthographies.
ځ	ـځ	ـځـ	ځـ	[d͡z]	З̌ з̌	Ʒ ʒ	U+0681	Modified letters adopted from Pashto. Similar letters exist in Khowar, Munji, and Wakhi orthographies.
د	ـد	-		[d]	Д д	D d	U+062f	
ذ	ـذ	-		[z]	З з	Z z	U+0630	Only used in loanwords. Pronounced as it would be in Dari Persian.
ڎ	ـڎ	-		[ð]	Д̌ д̌	Δ δ	U+068E	Unique to Shughni, not part of Persian alphabet. While the letter zol "ذ" represents the phoneme [ð], this new letter has been introduced so that there can be distinguishment between the native sound [ð] and the sound [z] produced by the letter "ث" in loanwords. Some authors have used the letter zol "ذ" for both purposes.
ر	ـر	-		[r]	Р р	R r	U+0631	
ز	ـز	-		[z]	З з	Z z	U+0632	
ژ	ـژ	-		[ʒ]	Ж ж	Ž ž	U+0698	
ږ	ـږ	-		[ɣ]	Г̌ г̌	Γ̌ γ̌	U+0696	Modified letter adopted from Pashto.
س	ـس	ـسـ	سـ	[s]	С с	S s	U+0633	
ش	ـش	ـشـ	شـ	[ʃ]	Ш ш	Š š	U+0634	
ښ	ـښ	ـښـ	ښـ	[χ]	Х̌ х̌	X̌ x̌	U+069a	Modified letter adopted from Pashto. Similar letter exists in Munji, and Wakhi orthographies.
ص	ـص	ـصـ	صـ	[s]	С с	S s	U+0635	Only used in loanwords.
ض	ـض	ـضـ	ضـ	[z]	З з	Z z	U+0636	Only used in loanwords.
ط	ـط	ـطـ	طـ	[t]	Т т	T t	U+0637U	Only used in loanwords.
ظ	ـظ	ـظـ	ظـ	[z]	З з	Z z	U+0638	Only used in loanwords.
ع	ـع	ـعـ	عـ	[∅]/[ʔ]	-		U+0639	Only used in loanwords.
غ	ـغ	ـغـ	غـ	[ʁ]	Ғ ғ	Γ γ	U+063a	
ف	ـف	ـفـ	فـ	[f]	Ф ф	F f	U+0641	
ڤ	ـڤ	ـڤـ	ڤـ	[v]	В в	V v	U+06a4	Modified letter adopted from Northwestern Iranian Kurdish. Similar letter exists in Munji and Wakhi.
ق	ـق	ـقـ	قـ	[q]	Қ қ	Q q	U+0642	
ک	ـک	ـکـ	کـ	[k]	К к	K k	U+06a9	
گ	ـگ	ـگـ	گـ	[g]	Г г	G g	U+06af	
ل	ـل	ـلـ	لـ	[l]	Л л	L l	U+0644	
م	ـم	ـمـ	مـ	[m]	М м	M m	U+0645	
ن	ـن	ـنـ	نـ	[n]	Н н	N n	U+0646	
و	ـو	-	او / و	[w]/[uː]	В̌ в̌ Ӯ ӯ	W w Ū ū	U+0648	Represents two phonemes based on context, [w] and [u]. If used at the beginning of a word, if representing consonant [w], it will be written standalone "و", if representing a vowel [u], it will be preceded by alif "او".
ۈ	ـۈ	-	اۈ	[ɵ]	У̊ у̊	Ů ů	U+06C8	Letter unique to Shughni, combination of letter wāw "و" and superscript alif "◌ٰ", reflecting that the letter represents a vowel phoneme that's approximately between [u] and [ɔ]. Similar letter exists in Uyghur (itself using a modified version of the Persian alphabet) representing the phoneme [y].
ه	-	ـهـ	هـ	[Ø]/[◌ː] ([aː]/[ɛː]) ([h])	(А̄ а̄)	(Ā ā)	U+0647	Silent letter in most cases. Lengthens the vowel preceding it, vowels [aː] "ـَ"
ه	ـه	-		[a] ([h])	А а А̄ а̄	A a Ā ā	U+0647	Only at the end of the word does this letter represent vowel phoneme [a]. In the middle of words, this vowel is represented with diacritic (ـَ) which is usually dropped in writing. At the beginning of a word, the diacritic is placed on top of alif (اَ).
ی	ـی	ـیـ	ایـ / یـ	[j]/[i]	Й й Ӣ ӣ	Y y Ī ī	U+06cc	Represents two phonemes based on context, [j] and [i]. If used at the beginning of a word, if representing consonant [j], it will be written standalone "یـ", if representing a vowel [i], it will be preceded by alif "ایـ".
ې	ـې	ـېـ	اېـ	[e]	Е е Э э	E e Ê ê	U+06d0	Unique to Shughni, not part of Persian. Similar letter exists in Pashto orthography. Indicates a vowel, and when a word begins with this vowel phoneme, the letter needs to be preceded by alif (اېـ).
ے	ـے	-		[ɛ]~[i]	И и	I i	U+06D2	
ئ	ـئ	ـئـ	-	[Ø]/[ʔ]	/ Ъ ъ		U+0626	Limited use for writing of some diphthongs and mid-word glottal stops

==== Vowels ====
Shughni language consists of 10 vowels. There are 3 short vowels, which have 3 corresponding long vowels, and there are 4 additional long vowels. One of the topics of controversy in the process of compiling and standardizing Shughni orthography, was how to express all 9 of the vowels. In this process, modified letters from Pashto and Urdu (themselves being modified versions of the Persian alphabet) have been borrowed (ې and ے), a new letter has been created (اۈ) and due to a lack of the sound [h], the letter he (هـ ـهـ) has been repurposed from a consonant grapheme to a vowel one.

Below tables demonstrate how vowels are to be written in different positions within a word. Note that some vowels don't occur in specific positions in Shughni phonology. Also note that diacritics are generally dropped in writing. Also note that there exists free variation between the short vowels in colloquial Shughni.

А а	И и	У у	А̄ а̄	Ě ě	О о	У̊ у̊	Е е	Ӣ ӣ	Ӯ ӯ
A a	I i	U u	Ā ā	Ê ê	O o	Ů ů	E e	Ī ī	Ū ū
[a]	[ɛ~ɪ]	[ʊ]	[aː]	[ɛ]	[ɔ]	[ɵ]	[e]	[i]	[uː]
Vowels at the beginning of a word
اَ / ا	اِ / ا	اُ / ا	اَهـ	اِهـ	آ	اۈ	اېـ	ایـ	او
Vowels at the middle of a word
◌َ	◌ِ	◌ُ	◌َهـ / ـَهـ	◌ِهـ / ـِهـ	ا / ـا	ۈ / ـۈ	ېـ / ـېـ	یـ / ـیـ	و / ـو
Vowels at the end of a word
ه / ـه	ے / ـے	و / ـو	-	-	ا / ـا	ۈ / ـۈ	ې / ـې	ی / ـی	و / ـو

=== Cyrillic and Latin alphabets ===
Cyrillic (Latin) [IPA] Persian	А а (A a) [a] اَ / ◌َ / ه ـه	А̄ а̄ (Ā ā) [aː] اَهـ / ◌َهـ ـَهـ	Б б (B b) [b] ب	В в (V v) [v] ﭪ	В̌ в̌ (W w) [w] و	Г г (G g) [g] گ	Ғ ғ (Ɣ ɣ) [ʁ] غ	Г̌ г̌ (Ɣ̌ ɣ̌) [ɣ] ږ
Cyrillic (Latin) [IPA] Persian	Д д (D d) [d] د	Д̌ д̌ (Δ δ) [ð] ڎ	Е е (E e) [e]/[je] اېـ / ـېـ / ې	Ӗ ӗ (Ê ê) [ɛ] اِهـ / ◌ِهـ ـِهـ	Ж ж (Ž ž) [ʒ] ژ	З з (Z z) [z] ز، ذ، ض، ظ	З̌ з̌ (Ʒ ʒ) [d͡z] ځ	И и (I i) [ɛ~ɪ] اِ / ◌ِ / ے
Cyrillic (Latin) [IPA] Persian	Ӣ ӣ (Ī ī) [i] ایـ / ـیـ / ی	Й й (Y y) [j] یـ / ی	К к (K k) [k] ک	Қ қ (Q q) [q] ق	Л л (L l) [l] ل	М м (M m) [m] م	Н н (N n) [n] ن	О о (O o) [ɔ] آ / ا ـا
Cyrillic (Latin) [IPA] Persian	П п (P p) [p] پ	Р р (R r) [r] ر	С с (S s) [s] ‌س، ث، ص	Т т (T t) [t] ت، ط	Т̌ т̌ (Θ θ/ϑ) [θ] ٿ	У у (U u) [ʊ] اُ‌ / ◌ُ / و	Ӯ ӯ (Ū ū) [u] او / ـو	У̊ у̊ (Ů ů) [ɵ] اۈ / ـۈ
Cyrillic (Latin) [IPA] Persian	Ф ф (F f) [f] ف	Х х (X x) [χ] خ	Ҳ ҳ (H h) [∅]([h]) هـ، ح	Х̌ х̌ (X̌ x̌) [x] ښ	Ц ц (C c) [t͡s] څ	Ч ч (Č č) [t͡ʃ] چ	Ҷ ҷ (J̌ ǰ) [d͡ʒ] ج	Ш ш (Š š) [ʃ] ش
Cyrillic (Latin) [IPA] Persian	Э э (E e) [e] اېـ / ـېـ / ې							

=== Sample Text ===
Below is a sample text, the first few passages from translations of a British nursery rhyme, The Old Woman and Her Pig.

Persian Script	یے کمپیر ږنِکِک خو چید زِدیداوَند ڤَدت یے ځُلِکِک جُکچِن شش پولے یے ڤِرود. یه یے لۈد اِدی:‌ «وُز کو مے ځُلِکِک شش پولے قتے چیز زِهم؟» — «وُز بازار سَهم خو یے خوگبُڅ خَریتُم.» یه تَر بازار سَت خو یے خوگبُڅے خَریت چود.
Cyrillic Script	Йи кампӣр г̌никик хӯ чӣд зидӣдов̌анд вадт йи ҙуликик ҷукчин шаш пӯли йи вирӯд. Йа йи лу̊д иди: «В̌уз кӯ ми ҙуликик шаш пӯли қти чӣз зӗм?» —«В̌уз бозор са̄м хӯ йи хӯгбуц харӣтум.» Йа тар бозор сат хӯ йи хӯгбуци харӣт чӯд.
Latin Script	Yi kampīr ɣ̌inikik xu čīd zidīdowand vad at yi ʒulikik jukčin xoɣ̌ pūli virūd. Yāyi bād lůd idi: «Wuz ku mi ʒulikik xoɣ̌ pūl qati čīz zȇm?» —«Wuz tar bozor sām xu yi xūgbuc xarītum.» Yā tar bozor sat xu yi xūgbuci xarīt čūd.
Persian Translation (Iranian and Dari)	پیرزنی در حال جارو کردن خانه‌اش بود و یک سکه خورد و کج شده شش پنسی را پیدا کرد. او به خودش گفت که: «با این سکه خورد شش پنسی چه کنم؟»—«من به بازار می روم و یک خوکچه را می خرم.» پیرزن به بازار رفت و یک خوکچه را خرید.
Persian Translation (Tajik)	Пиразан хонаашро руфта истода буд, ки сиккаи шикастаи шаш пенсӣро ёфт. Худ ба худ гуфт: «Ин сиккаи шикастаи шаш пенсӣро чӣ кунам?» — «Ба бозор рафта, як хукча мехарам.» Пиразан ба бозор рафта, хукча харид.
Pashto Translation	یوه بوډۍ ښځه په خپل کور کې جاړو کوله کله چې هغې د شپږو پیسو ټوټه وموندله. له ځان سره يې وويل: "زه د دې موندلې شوي شپږ پیسو سره څه وکړم؟" - "زه به بازار ته لاړه شم او يو سور به واخلم." بوډۍ بازار ته لاړه او یو خنزیر یې واخیست.

== Syntax ==
Shughni is a language of the nominative alignment type with certain ergative constructions. The typical word order is SOV: the finite verb form tends to appear at the end of the sentence. An exception is the copula, expressed by personal enclitics; it tends to occur at the beginning of the sentence.

The head noun usually follows the modifier; in the ezâfeh construction borrowed from Persian, this rule is violated. The predicate agrees with the head of the attributive phrase (for example, in the sentence yi qāp žindam tis sut “the sack [fem.] of wheat [masc.] spilled [masc.],” the verb agrees with the name of the substance rather than the measure).

Unmarked members of the noun phrase occur in the following order: determiner, possessive pronoun, numeral, adjective, noun.

== Lexicon ==
The Shughni language contains many loanwords from Tajik Persian, especially in cultural spheres. There is also a layer of borrowings from Russian. To a lesser extent, a few borrowings from Indo-Aryan languages are noticeable. In addition, there exists areal vocabulary characteristic of the Iranian Pamir languages. There are a small number of modern borrowings from English. Shughni is rich in phraseological expressions, many of which are also found in other Iranian languages.

Comparative table of vocabulary in seven Iranian languages
English	Persian	Shughni	Rushani	Sarikoli	Wakhi	Pashto	Avestan
son	pesar (پسر)	puc	puc	půc / pыc	pətr	zoy (زوی)	puθra (𐬞𐬎𐬚𐬭𐬀)
fire	ātaš (آتش)	yoc	yūc	yuc	rыxnīg	aor / or (اور)	ātar (𐬁𐬙𐬀𐬭)
water	āb (آب)	x̌ac	x̌ac	x̌ac	yupk	óbə (اوبه)	ap (𐬀𐬞)
hand	dast (دست)	δust	δost	δů/ыst	δast	lâs (لاس)	zasta (𐬰𐬀𐬯𐬙𐬀)
foot	pā (پا)	poδ	pöδ / pūδ	peδ	pы̄d / pы̄δ	px̌a (پښه)	pāδa (𐬞𐬁𐬜𐬀)
tooth	dandān (دندان)	δandon / δindůn	δindon	δandun	dы̄ndы̄k	ǧāx̌ (غاښ)	dantan (𐬛𐬀𐬥𐬙𐬀𐬥)
eye	češm (چشم)	cem	cām	cem	č̣ə̄m / č̣ə̄ẓ̌m	stərga (سترګه)	cašman (𐬗𐬀𐬱𐬨𐬀𐬥)
horse	asb (اسب)	vorǰ	vūrǰ	vurǰ	yaš	ās / as (اس / آس)	aspa (𐬀𐬯𐬞𐬀)
cloud	abr (ابر)	abri; varm / warm	abri; varm	varm	mūr	owrë́ / wóra (اوره / ووره)	aβra (𐬀𐬡𐬭𐬀); dunman (𐬛𐬎𐬥𐬨𐬀𐬥)
wheat	gandom (گندم)	žindam	žindam	žandam	ɣ̌ədīm	ǧanëm (غانم)	gaṇtuma (𐬔𐬀𐬧𐬙𐬎𐬨𐬀)
meat	gušt (گوشت)	gūx̌t	gūx̌t	ɡы̄x̌t / gůx̌t	gūṣ̌t	ǧwax̌a (غوښه)	gao (𐬔𐬀𐬊)
far	dur (دور)	δar	δar	δar	δir	lëre (لرې)	dūirē (𐬛𐬏𐬌𐬭𐬉)
good	xūb (خوب)	bašānd	bašānd	čarǰ	baf	x̌ë (ښه)	hu- (-𐬵𐬎)
to sleep	x(w)ābīdan (خوابیدن)	x̌êvdow	x̌evdow	x̌uvdaw	rыx̌ыpak	widə kedəl (ویده کیدل)	xᵛafsaiti (𐬓𐬀𐬟𐬯𐬀𐬌𐬙𐬌)
small	kučak (کوچک)	ʒul	bucik	ʒůl / ʒыl	ʒəl (qay)	kučnay (کوچنی)	kasyah (𐬐𐬀𐬯𐬫𐬀𐬵)
to speak	goftan (گفتن)	luvdow / lůvdow	luvdow / lūvdow	levdaw / levdεw	x̌ənak	ǧaǵedël (غږېدل)	aoj-, mrû-, sangh-, framraomi, sanghaite, vac-
to do	kardan (کردن)	čīdow	čīgow	čεygaew / čεygaw / čεygεw	cərak	kawә́l (کول)	kar
to see	dīdan (دیدن)	wīntow	wuntow	wandaw / wandæw / wandεw	wīnak, wīng	lidə́l (ليدل)	diδāiti (𐬛𐬌𐬜𐬁𐬌𐬙𐬌)

== Literature ==
- Edelman, D. (Joy) I. and Leila R. Dodykhudoeva (2009). "Shughni." In: Gernot Windfuhr (ed.), The Iranian Languages, 787-824. London & New York: Routledge.
- Olson, Karen (2017). Shughni Phonology Statement. SIL International.
- Zarubin, I. I. (1960). Shugnanskie teksty i slovar. Moskva: Izd-vo Akademii nauk SSSR.
