= Rushani language =

Pamir language of Afghanistan and Tajikistan

Rushani
- Rushan, Roshani, Oroshani
- rix̌ůn ziv риx̌ӯн зив
- Native to: Afghanistan, Tajikistan
- Ethnicity: 73,800 Rushan people
- Native speakers: (18,000 cited 1990)
- Language family: Indo-European: Indo-Iranian; Iranian; Southeastern Iranian; Shughni-Yazghulami-Munji; Shughni-Yazghulami; Shughni-Sarikoli; Shughni; Rushani-Khufi; Rushani

Official status
- Recognised minority language in: Tajikistan (in Gorno-Badakhshan)

Language codes
- ISO 639-3: –
- Linguist List: sgh-rus
- Glottolog: rush1239
- ELP: Rushani
- Rushani is classified as Severely Endangered by the UNESCO Atlas of the World's Languages in Danger

Rushani is one of the Eastern Iranian Pamir languages spoken in Afghanistan and Tajikistan. Rushani is relatively closer to all Northern Pamiri languages sub-group whether it is Shughni, Yazgulami, Sarikuli or Oroshori sharing many grammatical and vocabulary similarity with all of them especially with Shughni and thus some linguists consider it a dialect of Shughni.

Rushan is divided into two parts by Panj river where on right bank along Bartang river to the East located Rushan district of GBAO, Tajikistan and on the left side located several villages of Roshan area in northern part of the Sheghnan District, in the Badakhshan Province of Afghanistan and the Gorno-Badakhshan Autonomous Region in Tajikistan. Afghani Roshan consists of six villages including Rubotin, Paguor, Chawed, York, Shaikhin and Chasnud, five of which are located on the bank of the river Panj, which meets at the border of Tajikistan. Most Rushani speakers belong to the Ismaili branch of Shi'a Islam.

== Language use ==
Rushani, like Shughni, is only used in unofficial settings. All of the children in the community learn Rushani as their first language and rely heavily on it until they enroll in school. It is only then that they learn the official language of the country. Adult speakers are all bi- or tri-lingual in Tajik Persian and Russian.

Traditionally Rushani was not a written language, with Rushani speakers writing in Persian. Writing systems have been developed for the language using Cyrillic and Latin scripts, for example for use in translation of parts of the bible by the Institute for Bible Translation.

== Phonology ==
=== Vowels ===
| | Front | Central | Back |
|---|---|---|---|
| Close | i | | u |
| Near-close | ɪ | | ʊ |
| Close-mid | e | ɵ | o |
| Open-mid | ɛ | | ɔ |
| Open | a | | ɑ |

- Long vowels occur as /iː, eː, oː, uː/

=== Consonants ===
The following are the consonants of Rushani:

| | | Labial | Dental/ Alveolar | | Post- alveolar | Velar | Uvular | Glottal |
| | | Labial | plain | sibilant | Post- alveolar | Velar | Uvular | Glottal |
|---|---|---|---|---|---|---|---|---|
| Plosive/ Affricate | voiceless | p | t | t͡s | t͡ʃ | k | q | |
| Plosive/ Affricate | voiced | b | d | d͡z | d͡ʒ | ɡ | | |
| Fricative | voiceless | f | θ | s | ʃ | x | χ | (h) |
| Fricative | voiced | v | ð | z | ʒ | ɣ | ʁ | |
| Nasal | | m | n | | | (ŋ) | | |
| Approximant | | | l | | j | w | | |
| Rhotic | | | r | | | | | |

- /r/ can be realised as a trill [r] or a tap [ɾ].
- A glottal /h/ may also appear due to the influence of Tajik Persian.

== Orthography ==
| Cyrillic | Latin | Cyrillic | Latin | Cyrillic | Latin | Cyrillic | Latin | Cyrillic | Latin |
|---|---|---|---|---|---|---|---|---|---|
| А а | A a | Д д | D d | Й й | Y y | П п | P p | Ф ф | F f |
| А̄ а̄ | Ā ā | Д̌ д̌ | Δ δ | К к | K k | Р р | R r | Х х | X x |
| Б б | B b | Е е | E e | Қ қ | Q q | С с | S s | Х̌ х̌ | X̌ x̌ |
| В в | V v | Ж ж | Ž ž | Л л | L l | Т т | T t | Ц ц | C c |
| В̌ в̌ | W w | З з | Z z | М м | M m | Т̌ т̌ | Θ ϑ | Ч ч | Č č |
| Г г | G g | Ҙ ҙ | Ӡ ӡ | Н н | N n | У у | U u | Ҷ ҷ | J̌ ǰ |
| Г̌ г̌ | Ɣ̌ ɣ̌ | И и | I i | О о | O o | Ӯ ӯ | Ū ū | Ш ш | Š š |
| Ғ ғ | Ɣ ɣ | Ӣ ӣ | Ī ī | О̄ о̄ | Ō ō | У̊ у̊ | Ů ů | | |

== Verbs ==
Rushani is unusual in having a transitive alignment system – a so-called double-oblique clause structure – in the past tense. That is, in the past tense, the agent and object of a transitive verb are both marked, while the subject of an intransitive verb is not. In the present tense, the object of the transitive verb is marked, the other two roles are not – that is, a typical nominative–accusative alignment. See transitive alignment for examples.

== Literature ==
- Zarubin, I.I. Bartangskie i rushanskie teksty i slovar. Moskva : Izd-vo Akademii nauk SSSR, 1937.
- Payne, John, "Pamir languages" in Compendium Linguarum Iranicarum, ed. Schmitt (1989), 417–444.
- Payne, John. "The decay of ergativity in Pamir languages." Lingua 51:147-186.
