= Pashtun tribes =

Large family units of the Eastern Iranian ethnic groups

Indo-European migrations

The Pashtun tribes (Pashto: پښتانه قبايل), are tribes of the Pashtun people, a large Eastern Iranian ethnic group who speak the Pashto language and follow Pashtunwali, the social code of conduct for Pashtuns. They are found primarily in Afghanistan and Pakistan and form the world's largest tribal society, comprising over 60 million people and between 350 and 400 tribes and clans. They are traditionally divided into four tribal confederacies: the Sarbani (سړبني), the Bettani (بېټني), the Ghurghushti (غرغښت), the Karlani (کرلاڼي) and a few allied tribes of those that are Ismailkhel, Khel, Ludin, Sakzai, and Zai.

Folkloric genealogies trace the ancestors of the Pashtuns to Qais Abdur Rashid and his three sons Saṛban (سړبن), Bēṭ (بېټ), and Gharghax̌t (غرغښت) as well as an adopted son, not directly adopted by Qais Abdul Rashid, but the identity of the adoptee, Karlāņ (کرلاڼ), as well as the man who adopted him. According to some books written on the history of the Pashtuns, it is either unclear or controversial. The Karlani confederacy Ormur Baraki, who became the progenitor of the Karlani.

There are several levels of the Pashtun tribal organization. The "tribe" is subdivided into kinship groups, each of which is a khel and zai. A khel or zai is further divided into plarina, each of which consists of several extended families. A large tribe often has dozens of subtribes whose members may see themselves as belonging to each, some or all of the sub-tribes in their family tree depending upon the social situation: co-operative, competitive or confrontational.

== Etymologies ==
Tarbur refers to a "tribe" split into two or more clans. Tarbur means "cousin" in Pashto, so tarbur could be an enemy as well in the Pashtun culture that they can occupy your land or property. Every Pashtun tribe is then divided into subtribes, also called khel or zai. Zai in Pashto means "descendant". William Crooke has said that khel is from an Arabic word meaning "association" or "company".

A khel is often based in a single village, but it may also be based on a larger area including several villages, or part of a town.

Plarina is related to the Bactrian term plār, which derives from Old Iranian piðar (in Bactrian and Pashto, Old Iranian /ð/ usually yields /l/), and is related to Sanskrit pitar and English "father". The plural form of plār is plārina. A plārina is considered only when the 7th generation is born, meaning the father of multiple families (kahol). Usually, the 7th forefather is assumed to take from one-and-a-half century to two centuries. Kul (plural kahol) is the smallest unit in Pashtun tribal system, named after an ancestor of 1. Zāman ("children"), 2. Lmasay / Nwasay ("grandchildren"), 3. Kaṛwasay ("great-grandchildren"), and 4. Kaoday ("great-great-grandchildren"). Once the fourth generation is born, it would be labelled a "family" or kūl.

== Dialects ==
A CIA map showing traditional Afghan tribal territories

The Bettani speak various Pashto dialects. The Ghilji or (Gharzai) of the central region around Paktika speak Central Pashto, a dialect with unique phonetic features, transitional between the southern and the northern dialects of Pashto. The Lohani (Rohani, Nohani) Marwat, as well as some other minor Lodi tribes and the Bettani proper, speak the Marwat Lodi Bettani dialect, which is a southern Pashto variety, however, its phonetics are different from the southern Kandahari Pashto. The Sheerani tribe of the Bettani confederacy speaks another southern dialect. The northern Bettani clans speak the northern or "hard" Pashto variety. Some of the Bettani lineages, including some (but not all) clans of the Niazi, have abandoned Pashto. Today they speak other languages, like Urdu, Hindko, Saraiki, Punjabi and Dari.

The Gharghashti Kakar, Naghar, Panni, Mandokhel, and Musakhel and other minor tribes settled in the region around Quetta and Zhob. The Loralai speak a dialect which is a "soft" Pashto dialect, similar to the Kandahari dialect. The Safi, a few Jaduns, and other minor northern Gharghashti tribes speak the northern or "hard" Pashto variety. The Jaduns, living on the Mahabun mountain slopes around Swabi speak Pashto, while those living in Hazara speak Pashto and Hindko. Some clans of the Safi tribe speak the Pashayi languages but are mostly bilingual in Pashto.

The Karlani speak some of the most distinctive Pashto dialects which are lexically different from standard Pashto varieties, considered phonetically varied. Furthermore, the Karlani dialects have a tendency towards a change in the pronunciation of vowels. Depending on the particular dialect, the standard Pashto [a], [ā], [o], [u] may change into [ā], [â/å/o], [ȯ/ȫ/e], [i], respectively. In the Karlani dialects of Waziristan, Bannu, Tani (southern Khost), and Mangal, follow the vowel shift to the greatest extent, these four vowels normally change into [ā], [o], [e], [i], respectively. The Ormur tribe settled in some villages in Waziristan and Logar, who gave their name to Ormur the folkloric ancestor of the Karlani, which spoke the Ormuri language which is distinct from Pashto. However, in general the Ormur are bilingual in Pashto, particularly in the Karlani Wazirwola dialect.

The Southwestern Sarbani tribes, most notably the Durrani, speak the Southern Pashto dialect, a "soft" dialect of Pashto; while northwestern Sarbani tribes speak the Northern Pashto dialect, a "hard" dialect of Pashto. Both of them are considered upper class dialects. In addition, a small section of the Tarin clan of the Sarbani living east of Quetta speak the distinctive Wanetsi (Tareeno) dialect, which is considered by some modern scholars to be distinctive enough to be classified as its own language.

== History ==
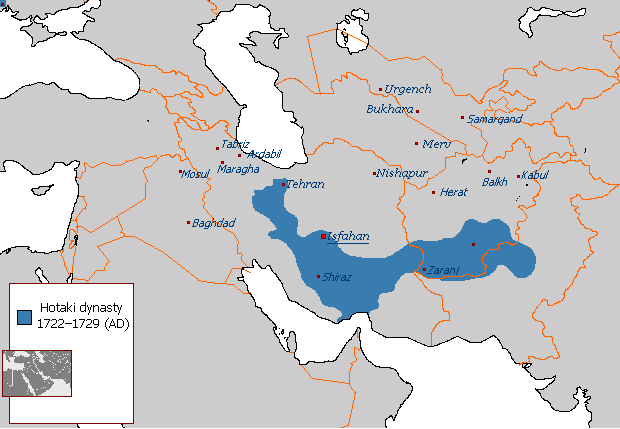
The Hotak Empire at its peak (1722–1729). It was established by the Hotak-Ghilji clan of the Bettani confederacy, and mainly encompassed parts of present-day Afghanistan, Iran, and Pakistan

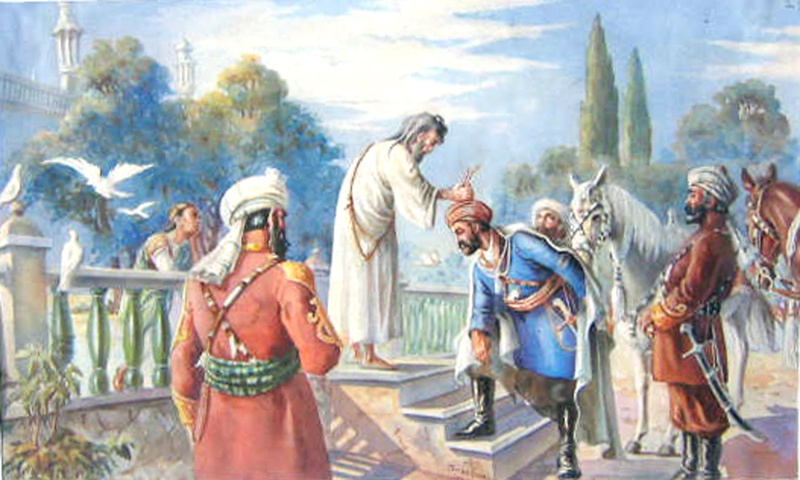
Coronation of Ahmad Shah Durrani (Durr-e Durrānī; the "founder of Afghanistan"), following a loya jirga held at Kandahar in 1747. The modern Durrani tribe is named after him

The origin of Pashtuns is unclear and obscure. The early ancestors of modern-day Pashtuns may have belonged to the old Iranian tribes that spread throughout the easternmost Iranian plateau, modern scholars have suggested that a common and singular origin is unlikely due to the Pashtuns historical existence as a tribal confederation. Various theories of varying credibility have been put forth, such descent from Saka, Hepthalites and Pakhtas. Often characterised as a warrior and martial race, their history is mostly spread among various countries of the eastern Iranian Plateau and the North West Indian Subcontinent. One theory suggests that the modern Ghilji lineages descended from the medieval Khalaj or Khilji tribe. Some Bettani lineages, however, are said to have descended in part from the medieval Ghorid people. The Bettani are named after their folkloric leader or ancestor, Shaikh Bet Baba (claimed to be among the first Pashto-language poets), who lived in the Altamur range, located between the Logar and Zurmat valleys. He is reported to have been buried in Ghazni.

In the 15th century, the Bettani are known to have mainly inhabited the Logar, Zurmat, and Ghazni regions. Subsequently, many of their lineages settled to the northeast, spreading up to the Damaan Valley, Mianwali, and parts of the present-day Hazara Division of Khyber Pakhtunkhwa, Pakistan, in the east, and parts of Kunduz Afghanistan in the north. In the 19th century, the traditional way of life of the Bettani combined small-scale irrigated agriculture with seasonal nomadism or seminomadism. They engaged in pastoral migrations, along the mountain slopes in summers, and inversely, towards the Indus plains in winters. From the 13th century, various Khilji dynasties and ruling entities took control in the Bengal and Delhi Sultanates of the Indian subcontinent.

In the 15th century, the Lodi tribe founded the Lodi dynasty, the last dynasty to rule the Delhi Sultanate. In the 16th century, the Sur Empire with its capital at Delhi was founded by Sher Shah Suri, a member of the Sur clan of the Bettani confederacy. Between 1709 and 1738, the Hotak clan of the Ghilji tribe ruled the Hotak Empire based first in Kandahar, Afghanistan and later very briefly in Isfahan, Persia.

In the 16th century, Taj Khan Karrani of the Karlani tribe founded the Karrani dynasty, the last dynasty to rule the Bengal Sultanate. Several Karlani clans served in the Mughal army. The Bhopal State, in the present-day Madhya Pradesh state of Central India, was founded in 1723 by Dost Mohammad Khan Mirazikhel. He was from the Orakzai clan of the Karlani tribe, and was a mercenary in the Mughal army. After his death in 1728, his descendants, the Nawabs of Bhopal, continued ruling the state until Hamidullah Khan, the last sovereign nawab of the dynasty, officially acceded the state to India in 1949.

Ahmad Shah Durrani of the Sadozai clan, branch of the Popalzai, which was part of the Abdali tribe (now known as "Durrani") established the Durrani Empire in 1747 with its capital at Kandahar. Ahmad Shah adopted the title Durr-e Durrānī ("pearl of pearls" or "pearl of the age"), and the name of his tribe Abdali was changed to "Durrani" after him. Ahmad Shah is now regarded as the founder of the modern state of Afghanistan. He controlled areas from Khorasan in the west up to Kashmir and Delhi in the east, and from the Amu Darya in the north up to the Arabian Sea in the south. It was the second-greatest Muslim empire in the second half of the 18th century, surpassed in size only by the Ottoman Empire.

In 1826, Dost Mohammad Khan, of the Barakzai clan of the Durrani tribe, founded the Barakzai dynasty centered at Kabul. The Barakzai dynasty ruled present-day Afghanistan until 1973 when Mohammed Zahir Shah, the last Barakzai king, was overthrown in a bloodless coup by his own cousin Mohammed Daoud Khan. The coup ended the Barakzai kingdom and established the Republic of Afghanistan (1973–1978). The current heir apparent and crown prince of the Barakzai kingdom (23 July 2007 – present) is Ahmad Shah Khan.

During the Delhi Sultanate era, the Pashtun Lodi dynasty replaced the Turkic rulers in North India. Some ruled from the Bengal Sultanate. Majority Pashtuns fought the Safavids and Mughals before obtaining an independent state in the early 18th century, which began with a successful revolution by Mirwais Hotak followed by conquests of Ahmad Shah Durrani. During the 19th and early 20th century, the Barakzai dynasty found itself involved perforce between an Anglo-Russian military and diplomatic confrontation known as the "Great Game". Pashtuns are the largest dominion ethnic group in Afghanistan and ruled as the dominant ethno-linguistic group for over 300 years.

== See also ==
- Ethnic groups in Pakistan
- Ethnic groups in Afghanistan
- Pashtunistan
- Pashtunwali
