= Afridi Pashto =

Subdialect of the Pashto language

Afridi or Apridi Pashto (Pashto: اوپریدی ،افريدی، اپريدی afrīdī/aprīdī/opride) is a Northern Karlani dialect of the Pashto language that is widespread among the representatives of the Afridis kin. The Afridi Pashto is a spoken language in the area of settlement of Afridis – the regions of Khyber and Kohat, Orakzai Agency, the cities of Zakka Khel, Jamrud, Darra Adam Khel and the valley of Timrakh. The Afridi dialect has an 80–90% lexical intelligibility with other Northern dialects of Pashto, while the intelligibility with the dialects of the Southern Region is 75–80%.

== Phonetics ==
The phonetics of Afridi Pashto are similar to the phonetics of other Northern dialects of Pashto.

Dialects	ښ	ږ	څ	ځ	ژ	a	ā	o	u
Southern Pashto	[ʂ]	[ʐ]	[t͡s]	[d͡z]	[ʒ]	[a]	[ɑ]	[o]	[u]
Quetta dialect	[ʃ]	[ʒ]	[t͡s]	[d͡z]	[ʒ]	[a]	[ɑ]	[o]	[u]
Afridi	[x]	[ɡ]	[t͡s]	[z]	[d͡ʒ]	[ɑ]	[ɒ, o]	[o]	[u]
Northern Pashto (Eastern Pashto)	[x]	[ɡ]	[t͡s]	[z]	[ʒ]	[a]	[ɑ]	[o]	[u]
Peshawar dialect	[x]	[ɡ]	[s]	[z]	[d͡ʒ]	[a]	[ɑ]	[o]	[u]

== See also ==
- Pakistan
- Afghanistan
- Pashto language
