= Ismailkhel =

Pashtun tribe in Pakistan and Afghanistan

Ismail Khel (Pashto: اسماعیل خیل) also rendered as Ismael Khel, Ismaeel Khel and Asmaal Khel is a Pashtun tribe in Pakistan and Afghanistan. Ismail Khel is settled and resides in Bannu and Karak(Manzini Banda); the historic districts in the Khyber Pakhtunkhwa province, city of Attock area Chhachh, and Khost Province of Afghanistan.

== Notables ==
- Ghulam Ishaq Khan (1915-2006)
- Dr Niaz Ali Khan (1970-)
- Mutahir Niaz
- Dr Musaddiq Niaz
- Dr Musawir Niaz
