= Khel (clan) =

Pashto word indicating a Pashtun sub-tribe

Khel (Pashto: خېل) are sub-tribes of Pashtun tribes in Afghanistan and Pakistan. The title of the tribe ends in Zai and its sub-tribe name ends in Khel. Khel is also a common final element in the names of villages in Afghanistan and in the Khyber Pakhtunkhwa of Pakistan, such as Darra Adam Khel.

Some of the clans of Pashtun tribes:

- Daulat Khel
- Shamshe khel
- Ghoryakhel
- Hasan Khēl
- Isakhel (sub-tribe)
- Kamal Khel
- Khan Khel
- Khwaja Khel
- Maghdud Khel
- Mahmud Khel
- Musakhel
- Umar Khel
- Utmankhel
- Jalal khel

== See also ==
- Zai (tribe)
- Pashtun people
