= Masidwola dialect =

Dialect of the Waziristani language

Masidwola
- Waziri, Dawari, Maseedwola
- Native to: Pakistan, Afghanistan
- Region: Waziristan
- Language family: Indo-European: Indo-Iranian; Iranian; Eastern; Pashto; Waziristani; Masidwola

Language codes
- ISO 639-3: None (mis)

Masidwola (Pashto: ماسیدوله, meaning "of the Mehsuds"), Mehsudi, or Maseedwola is a dialect of Waziristani.

== Phonology ==
Rozi Khan Burki claims that in Waziristani is that the phonemes [ʃ] and [ʂ], along with their voiced counterparts, [ʒ] and [ʐ], have merged into the phonemes [ɕ] and [ʑ], both of which also exist in the nearby Ormuri or Warmuri language of Burkis of Kaniguram, South Waziristan. But Pashto linguists such as Josef Elfenbein, Anna Boyle or Yousaf Khan Jazab have not noted this in Waziri Phonology.

== See also ==
- Waneci

== Notes ==
- Linguist List
- Lorimer, John Gordon (1902). Grammar and Vocabulary of Waziri Pashto.
