= Pashto dialects =

Dialects of the Pashto language

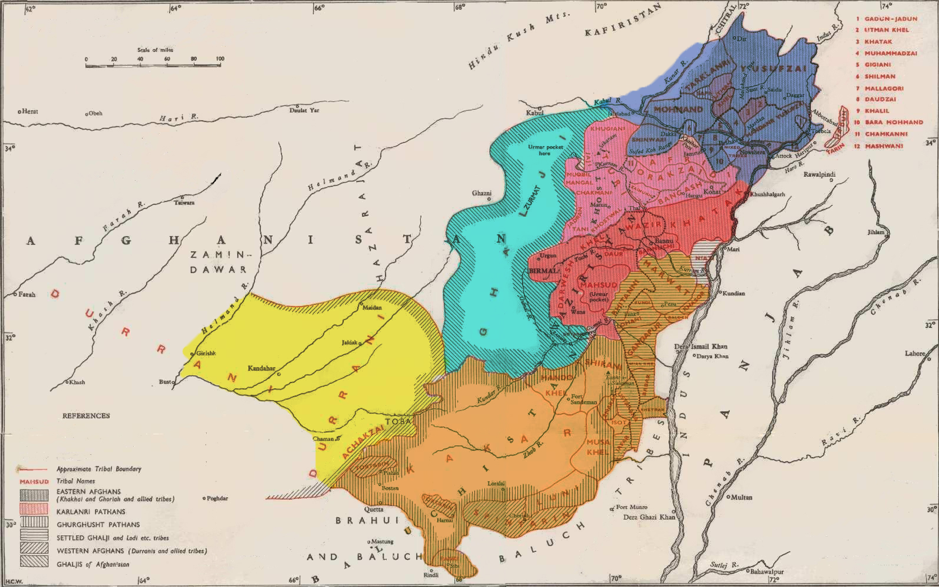
Dialectical Map of Pashto: An edited map of the Pashtun tribes, from Olaf Caroe’s “The Pathans”. The North Eastern dialects have been highlighted in dark blue, the North Western dialects in light blue, the North-Central (North Karlāṇi) is pink, the South-Central (South Karlāṇi) in red, the South Eastern in orange and the South Western in yellow.

Pashto dialects (Pashto: د پښتو ژبګوټي də Pəx̌tó žәbgóṭi) can be divided into two large varieties: Northern Pashto and Southern Pashto. Each of the two varieties of Pashto is further divided into a number of dialects. Northern Pashto is spoken in eastern Afghanistan, and central, northern and eastern Khyber Pakhtunkhwa (including Peshawar). Southern Pashto is spoken to the south of it, in southern and western Afghanistan (including Kandahar), southern Khyber Pakhtunkhwa and northern Balochistan (including Quetta). 'Ethnologue' divides Pashto into Northern, Southern and Central Pashto, and Wanetsi.

Pashto Dialects - "we"
Northern [Eastern and Western dialects]
/muɡ/

Northern [Eastern and Western dialects]
/munɡ/

Northern Eastern [Wardak Dialect]
/muʝ/

Central [Waziri]
/miʒ/

Central [Zadrāni]
/miʝ/

South Western [possibly Kunduz]
/muʐ/

South Eastern [Quetta]
/muʒ/

South Western [Kandahar]
/muʐ/

== Overview ==
According to David Neil MacKenzie, a consonant shift took place in the northern parts of Pashtunistan in several phases in the medieval era. During the shift, the retroflex fricative ṣ̌ [ʂ] changed to x̌ [ç] or to x [x], while ẓ̌ [ʐ] changed to ǵ [ʝ] or to g [g]. That is supported by the linguist Georg Morgenstierne's assertion that the Pashto script developed in the Northeast which had the phonology of a Southwestern Pashto in the 16th century. The shift was likely complete before the Pashto book Khayr al-Bayān was written by Bayazid Pir Roshan from Waziristan in 1651. According to Michael M. T. Henderson in Balochistan [Southeast]: the spilt ṣ̌ [ʂ] into š [ʃ] and ẓ̌ [ʐ] into ž [ʒ] may never have occurred in that they were always pronounced as š [ʃ] and ž [ʒ] there or that a split did occur.

Among the other Eastern Iranian languages outside Pashto, the Shughni (Khughni) and Yazgulyami branch of the Pamir languages also seem to have been affected from the ṣ̌ to x consonant shift. E.g. "meat": ɡuṣ̌t in Wakhi and ğwáṣ̌a in Southwestern Pashto, but changes to guxt in Shughni and ğwáxa in Northeastern Pashto.

== Classification ==
1. Southern variety

- Abdali dialect (or South Western dialect)
- Kakar dialect (or South Eastern dialect)
- Shirani dialect
- Marwat-Bettani dialect
- Southern Karlani group

- Khattak dialect
- Baniswola dialect
- Dawarwola dialect
- Masidwola dialect
- Wazirwola dialect

2. Northern variety

- Central Ghilji dialect (or North Western dialect)
- Yusufzai dialect (or North Eastern dialect)
- Northern Karlani group

- Taniwola dialect
- Khosti dialect
- Zadran dialect
- Mangal dialect
- Afridi dialect
- Khogyani dialect
- Wardak dialect
- Miranzai Dialect (Bangash and Orakzai)

3. Waṇetsi Dialect

== Standards ==
=== Regional standards ===
There are several regional standard forms of Pashto which have high prestige, and serve as a means of communication between the various tribal communities in those regions.

==== Central Pashto ====
Central Pashto dialects are also referred to as middle.

Central Pashto Speak Mostly The Tribes of Bangash , Wazir , Banusi, Zadran , Mahsud & Dawar.

==== Southern regional standard ====
Southern Pashto compromises of the South Western and South Eastern dialects.

Southern Western Pashto, also called Kandahari Pashto, is the prestige variety of Pashto in southern and western Afghanistan.

A similar variety known as South Eastern is spoken in the Balochistan province of Pakistan.

==== Northern regional ====
Northern Pashto compromises of the North Western and North Eastern dialects.

North Eastern Pashto, also called Eastern Pashto, is the prestige variety of Pashto, known as Yusufzai Dialect, it is spoken in central, northern, and eastern parts of the Khyber Pakhtunkhwa province of Pakistan and in northeastern Afghanistan.

North Western Pashto is spoken, in eastern and northeastern Afghanistan, in the central Ghilji or Ghilzai region.

=== Tareeno ===
Although this dialect is spoken only by the Spin Tareens and not the Tor Tareens, it is known locally as Tareeno and by Western academics as Wanetsi. It is the most distinct amongst the dialects of Pashto.

== Features ==
Variations have been noted in dialects of Pashto. The differences between the standard varieties of Pashto are primarily phonological, and there are simple conversion rules. The morphological differences between the standard varieties are very few and unimportant. Two of the key phonemes whose pronunciation vary between the different Pashto dialects are ښ and ږ. The southern dialect of Kandahar is considered to be the most conservative with regards to phonology. It retains the original pronunciation of these two phonemes as voiceless and voiced retroflex sibilants, respectively, and does not merge them into other phonemes unlike the northern dialects.

The dialects spoken by the tribes from the Karlani confederacy of Pashtuns are lexicologically different and very varied. Moreover, the Karlani dialects have a tendency towards a change in the pronunciation of vowels. Depending on the particular dialect, the standard Pashto [a], [ā], [o], [u] may change into [ā], [â/å/o], [ȯ/ȫ/e], [i], respectively. In the Karlani dialects of Waziristan, Bannu, and Tani (southern Khost), which follow the vowel shift to the greatest extent, these four vowels normally change into [ā], [o], [e], [i], respectively.

The nine phonemes represented in the column headings below show key phonetic differences between the dialects. Five of them are consonants written in the Pashto alphabet, and four are vowels written in the Latin script; sounds are transcribed in the IPA:

Dialects	Subdialects	Location	ښ	ږ	څ	ځ	ژ	a	ā	o	u
Abdali		Southern and western Afghanistan, including Kandahar	[ʂ]	[ʐ]	[t͡s]	[d͡z]	[ʒ]	[a]	[ɑ]	[o]	[u]
Kākaṛ		Northern Balochistan	[ʃ]	[ʒ]	[t͡s]	[d͡z]	[ʒ, z]	[a]	[ɑ]	[o]	[u]
Shirani		Shirani and Darazinda	[ʃ]	[ʒ]	[t͡s, s]	[d͡z, z]	[z]	[a]	[ɑ]	[o]	[u]
Marwat-Beṭani-Ganḍāpur		Lakki Marwat, Jandola, Tank, and Dera Ismail Khan	[ʃ]	[ʒ]	[t͡ʃ]	[d͡ʒ]	[z]	[a]	[ɑ]	[o]	[u]
Tareeno	Haranai	Harnai and Sanjawi	[ʃ]	[ʒ]	[t͡s, s, t͡ʃ]	[d͡z, z, d͡ʒ]	[z]	[a]	[ɑ]	[o]	[u]
Tareeno	Choter	Harnai and Sanjawi	[ʃ]	[ʒ]	[t͡s, s, t͡ʃ]	[d͡z, z, d͡ʒ]	[z]	[a]	[ɑ]	[o]	[u]
Khattak	General	Karak District and eastern Kohat	[ʃ]	[ʒ]	[t͡s, s]	[d͡z, z]	[ʒ]	[ɑ]	[ɔ]	[o]	[u]
Khattak	Teri	Karak District and eastern Kohat	[ʃ]	[ʒ]	[t͡s, s]	[d͡z, z]	[ʒ]	[ɑ]	[ɔ]	[o]	[u]
Khattak	Nasrati	Karak District and eastern Kohat	[ʃ]	[ʒ]	[t͡s, s]	[d͡z, z]	[ʒ]	[ɑ]	[ɔ]	[o]	[u]
Baniswola		Bannu, Mir Ali, Baka Khel, Jani Khel	[ʃ]	[ʒ]	[s]	[z]	[ʒ]	[ɑ]	[ɔ]	[ɛː]	[i]
Dawarwola		Tochi in North Waziristan	[ʃ]	[ʒ]	[t͡s, s]	[d͡z, z]	[ʒ]	[ɑ]	[o]	[e]	[i]
Wazirwola	Southern (Ahmadzai)	From Janimela, South Waziristan to Shuidar Ghar (south of Razmak)	[ʃ]	[ʒ]	[t͡ʃ]	[d͡ʒ]	[ʒ]	[ɑ]	[ɒ]	[œː, ɛː]	[i]
Wazirwola	Masidwola	South Waziristan	[ʃ]	[ʒ]	[t͡ʃ]	[d͡ʒ]	[ʒ]	[ɑ]	[ɒ]	[œː, ɛː]	[i]
Wazirwola	Northern (Utmanzai)	North Waziristan, Khaisora Valley, Razmak, Dossali, Datta Khel, Spin Wam, Shawal	[ʃ]	[ʒ]	[t͡s, s]	[d͡z, z]	[ʒ]	[ɑ]	[ɔ]	[œː, ɛː]	[i]
Taṇi		Tani, Gurbuz, and Mandozayi, in southern Khost	[x]	[ɡ]	[t͡s, s]	[d͡z, z]	[ʒ]	[ɑ]	[o]	[e]	[i]
Khosti		Central and northern Khost	[x]	[ɡ]	[t͡s, s]	[d͡z, z]	[ʒ]	[ɑ]	[ɒ]	[ɵ]	[u]
Dzādroṇ		The Zadran Arc in southern Paktia, northeastern Paktika, and southwestern Khost	[ç]	[ʝ]	[t͡s]	[d͡z]	[ʒ]	[ɑ]	[o]	[o, e]	[u, i]
Bangash-Orakzai-Turi-Zazi-Mangal		Kurram, eastern Paktia, northeastern Khost, Orakzai, Hangu, and northwestern Kohat	[x]	[ɡ]	[t͡s, s]	[d͡z, z]	[ʒ]	[ɑ]	[ɔ]	[o]	[u]
Apridi	Kambar Khel	Central and southern Khyber and Darra Adamkhel	[x]	[ɡ]	[t͡s, s]	[d͡z, z]	[ʒ, d͡ʒ]	[ɑ]	[ɔ]	[ɵ]	[u, i]
Apridi	Zakha Khel	Central and southern Khyber and Darra Adamkhel	[x]	[ɡ]	[t͡s, s]	[d͡z, z]	[ʒ, d͡ʒ]	[ɑ]	[ɔ]	[ɵ]	[u, i]
Khogyani		Khogyani, Sherzad, and Pachir aw Agam, in southwestern Nangarhar	[x]	[ɡ]	[t͡s, s]	[d͡z, z]	[ʒ]	[ɑ]	[ɒ]	[ɵ]	[u]
Wardag		Chaki Wardak, Saydabad, Jaghatu, and Jilga, in central and southern Maidan Wardak	[ç]	[ʝ]	[t͡s]	[d͡z]	[ʒ, z]	[ɑ]	[ɒ]	[o]	[u]
Central Ghilzai		Central Ghilji region (Sharana, Qalat, southern Ghazni, etc.)	[ç]	[ʝ]	[t͡s, s]	[d͡z, z]	[ʒ, z]	[a]	[ɑ]	[o]	[u]
Momand and Shinwari	Upper Momand and Shinwari	Nangrahar province	[x]	[ɡ]	[t͡s, s]	[d͡z, z]	[ʒ]	[a]	[ɑ]	[o]	[u]
Momand and Shinwari	Lower Momand (Ghoryakhel)	Peshawar, Mohmand Districy	[x]	[ɡ]	[s]	[z]	[d͡ʒ]	[a]	[ɑ]	[o]	[u]
Yusapzai	Swat	Central, northern, and eastern Pakhtunkhwa (Dir, Swat, Swabi, Hazara etc.)	[x]	[ɡ]	[s]	[z]	[d͡ʒ]	[a]	[ɑ]	[o]	[u]
Yusapzai	Mardan	Central, northern, and eastern Pakhtunkhwa (Dir, Swat, Swabi, Hazara etc.)	[x]	[ɡ]	[s]	[z]	[d͡ʒ]	[a]	[ɑ]	[o]	[u]

- Dialects belonging to the southern non-Karlani variety, the southern Karlani variety, the northern Karlani variety, and the northern non-Karlani variety, respectively, are color-coded.
- Tareeno/Wanetsi is color-coded as pink

=== Grammar ===
The grammatical rules are may vary slightly in dialects; with the most divergence in Tarīno. Example:

Dialect	Dialect Sentence	Literary Pashto	Meaning	Divergence Noted
Kandahar	پلوشه راغلل Palwašá rā́ğləl	پلوشه راغله Palwašá rā́ğla	Palwasha came	3rd Person Plural Verbal suffix ل [əl] employed instead of 3rd Person Feminine Verbal Suffix ه [a]
Nangarhar	ما او تا ښار ته ځو mā aw tā xār tə zú	زه او ته ښار ته ځو zə aw tə x̌ār tə dzú	Me and you are going to the city	Oblique pronouns ما [mā] and تا [tā] used instead of direct pronouns زه [zə] and ته [tə]
Dzādzə́i	پلوشه زما خور دی Palwašá zmā xor de	پلوشه زما خور ده Palwašá zmā xor da	Palwasha is my sister	No differentiation in masculine and feminine "to be" - uses دی
Ghani Paktya	هلکان راغلو haləkā́n rā́ğlu	هلکان راغل haləkā́n rā́ğləl	The boys came	The third person plural verbal suffix "u" used instead of "əl"

=== Lexemes ===
==== Special words ====
Dialects can also have special vocabulary:

	Dialect	Meaning	Pashto general</general>	Borrowings
ديګول ḍigwә́l	Banisi	nest	جاله / ځاله dzā́la / jā́la	Not used
دوګول ḍugwә́l	Marwat	nest	جاله / ځاله dzā́la / jā́la	Not used
رېبون rebū́n	Waṇetsi	shirt	خت xat	کميس kamís [from Arabic]
کليس kə́līs	Waṇetsi	intellect		ذهن/عقل zehn/akə́l [from Arabic]
پينۍ pinə́i	Kakāṛi	universe	ټوپن ṭopán	جهان jahā́n [from Persian]

Example:

Special Vocabulary Example
Kə́līs (intellect)

Tareeno

Pashto [Southeastern Dialect]

ما دې دا خبرې ته کليس نه رسېژ

mā de dā xabə́re tə kə́līs nə́ raséž
me:1:SG:STR:POSS de:CONT:PARTICLE this:DEM word:F:SG:OBL to:POST intellect:M:SG:DIR not:NEG reach:CONT:PRS:3:SG
This topic is beyond my understanding

Compare:

زما دغه خبرې ته ذهن/عقل نه رسېږي

zmā dáğe xabə́re tə zehn/akə́l nə́ raséži
me:1:SG:STR:POSS this:DEM:OBL word:F:SG:OBL to:POST intellect:M:SG:DIR not:NEG reach:CONT:PRS:3
This topic is beyond my understanding

==== Derivative words ====
These can be classed as deriving from "standard" Pashto

	Dialect	Derived From	Pashto general	Meaning
وېړکی wéṛkay	Wazirwola	ووړکی wóṛkay	هلک halə́k	boy
ږغ ʐağ	Kandahar	غږ ğaǵ		sound, voice, call
باچخه bāčə́xa	some Yusapzai	باچا bāčā́	ملکه maláka	queen
يره yára	Yusapazai	وېره wéra		fear

== Lexical comparison ==
English gloss	Kandahar	Quetta	Harnai	Lakki Marwat	Karak	Bannu Miramshah	Wana	Tani	Parachinar Bangash	Jamrud	Kaga Khogyani	Chaki Wardak	Sharana	Kabul	Peshawar	Pashto lexeme
Pashto	Paṣ̌to	Pašto	Pašto	Pašto	Pāštȫ	Pāšte	Pāšte	Pāxte	Pāxtȯ	Pāxtȫ	Pāxtȯ	Pāx̌tȯ	Pax̌to	Puxto	Puxto	پښتو
four	tsalor	tsalor	tsalor	čalor	tsālȫr	sāler	tsālwer	tsāler	tsālȯr	tsālwȫr	tsālȯr	tsālȯr	tsalor	tsalor	salor	څلور
six	špaẓ̌	špaž	špož	špaž	špež	špež	špež	špeg	špeg	špeg	špeg	špeǵ	špaǵ	špag	špag	شپږ
woman	ṣ̌ədza	šədza	šədza	šəǰa	šədzā	šəzā	šədzā	xədzā	x̌ədzā	xədzā	x̌ədzā	x̌ədzā	x̌ədza	xədza	xəza	ښځه
father	plār	plār	pyār	plār	plår	plor	plor	plor	plâr	plår	plâr	plâr	plār	plār	plār	پلار
many	ḍer zyāt	ḍer zyāt	tsaṭ	ḍer zyāt	ḍer zyåt	pirā zyot	rəṭ zyot	rəṭ zyot	ḍer zyât	ḍer zyåt	ḍer zyât	ḍer zyât	ḍer zyāt	ḍer zyāt	ḍer zyāt	ډېر زيات
few	ləẓ̌	ləž	ləž	ləž	ləž	ləški	ləški	ləg	ləg	ləg	ləg	ləǵ	ləǵ	ləg	ləg	لږ
how	tsənga	tsənga	tsona	čərang	tsərāng	sərāng	tsərāng	tsərge	tsəngā	tsərāng	tsəngā	tsəngā	tsənga	tsənga	singa	څنګه
who	tsok	tsok	čok	čok	tsȫk	sek	tsek	tsek	tsȯk	tsȫk	tsȯk	tsȯk	tsok	tsok	sok	څوک
to drink	čṣ̌əl	čšəl	ğwətang	čšəl	tshi	čšəl	čšəl	tsəxəl	tsəxəl	tsəxəl	tsəxəl	čx̌əl	čx̌əl	tskəl	skəl	څښل
foot	pṣ̌a	pša	špa, ğədəi	pša	pšā	pšā	pšā	pxā	pxā	pxā	pxā	px̌ā	px̌a	pxa	xpa	پښه
we	muẓ̌	muž	moš	muž	muž	miž	miž	mig	mu	mu	mu	muǵ	muǵ	mung	mung	موږ
my	zmā	zmā	mā eğē	emā	emå	emo	emo	emo	emâ	emå	emâ	emâ	zmā	zəmā	zamā	زما
your	stā	stā	tāğa	etā	etå	eto	eto	eto	etâ	etå	etâ	etâ	stā	stā	stā	ستا
girl	nǰiləi	nǰiləi	čwara	ǰinkəi	wȫṛkəi	weṛkye	weṛkye	weṛkye	wȯṛkəi	wȫṛkye	wȯṛkəi	wȯṛkəi	ǰiləi	ǰinəi	ǰinē	نجلۍ
boy	halək	halək	čorá	kṛāčay	wȫṛkāi	weṛkā	weṛkāi	weṛkāi	wȯṛkāi	wȫṛkāi	wȯṛkāi	wȯṛkāi	halək	halək	halək	هلک
Sun	lmar	lmar	mir	nmar	merə stərgā	myēr	ğormə stərgā	myerə stərgā	merə stərgā	merə stərgā	lmerə stərgā	lmer	lmar	nmar	nwar	لمر
egg	hagəi	hagəi	hoya	angəi	wȫyā	yeyā	yeyā	yeyā	ȯyā	wȫyā	ȯyā	ȯyā	hagəi	hagəi, hā	hagē, hā	هګۍ
yes/no	wo/ya	wo/na	wo/na	ya/na	wȫ	ē/nā	ē/nā	yē/nā	wȯ/nā	ē/nā	wȯ/nā	wȯ/nā	wo/na	wo/na	ao/na	هو\نه
home	kor	kor	kor	kor	kȫr	kēr	ker	ker	kȯr	kȫlə	kȯr	kȯr	kor	kor	kor	کور
I am	yəm	yəm	ī	yəm	yəm	yə	yə	yə	yəm	yəm	yəm	yəm	yəm	yəm	yəm	یم
I go	dzəm	dzəm	dramī	ǰəm	tsəm	sə	tsə	tsə	tsəm	tsəm	tsəm	tsəm	dzəm	dzəm	zəm	ځم
tongue	žəba	zəba	zbə	zəba	žəbā	žəbā	žəbā	žəbā	žəbā	ǰəbā	žəbā	zəbā	zəba	žəba	ǰəba	ژبه
it exists	sta	sta	sta	sta	štā	štā	štā	štā	štā	štā	štā	štā	sta	šta	šta	شته
bear	yiẓ̌	yiž	yiržá	yiž	yiž	yiž	yiž	yig	yig	yig	yig	yiǵ	yiǵ	yig	yig	ايږ
ant	meẓ̌ay	mežay	merža	mežay	mežāi	mežāi	mežāi	megāi	megāi	megāi	megāi	məǵātāi	meǵay	megay	megē	مېږی
English gloss	Kandahar	Quetta	Harnai	Lakki Marwat	Karak	Bannu	Wana	Tani	Parachinar	Jamrud	Kaga	Chaki Wardak	Sharana	Kabul	Peshawar	Pashto lexeme

In general, the Karlani dialects, both in southern and northern varieties, show more vocabulary differences than the non-Karlani southern and northern dialects.

== See also ==
- Pashto Swadesh list
- Eastern Iranian languages
- Proto-Indo-European language
- Indo-Iranian languages
