= Zai (suffix) =

Pashto word ending indicating a tribe

Zai (Pashto: زی zay 'son of'; plural: زي zī) is a suffix denoting a member of certain Pashtun tribes in Afghanistan and Pakhtunkhwa. Clan names within Pashtun tribes are typically formed with the word khel following the name of the respective ancestor from whom they are descended.

== Distribution ==
Members of such tribes are native to the geographic region of Pashtunistan in the present-day countries of Afghanistan and Pakistan.

Some tribes who use this suffix include:

- the Samozai
- the Yusufzai
- the Alizai
- the Dawoodzai
- the Madozai
- the Samadzai
- the Bahlolzai Mahsud

== See also ==
- Khel (clan)
- Pashtun tribes
- Pashtun
- Zada (suffix)
