= Sakzai =

Pashtun tribe

Sakzai (Pashto: ساکزي), also called Sakzi, Saagzi, Saakzai, Saakzay, Sajzi, Sajzai, Sakazai,, are a Pashtun tribe in Afghanistan located around the historical region of Sistan (modern day Nimroz, Helmand and Farah), as well as the Ghor region and the northern parts of the Sistan and Baluchestan Province of Iran.

Their name suggests a connection with the historic East Iranian Saka tribes of Central Asia, as well as the historical inhabitants of the region, Also they can be found among the Baloch tribes.

The Sakzai are 24 subtribes and 95 or 96 clans and approximately make up around 7.5% of Afghanistans nomadic population.
