= Shinkot =

- Location in Afghanistan
- Coordinates: 33°41′27″N 64°51′23″E
- Country: Afghanistan
- Province: Ghor
- District: Pasaband
- Elevation: 8,419 ft (2,566 m)
- Time zone: UTC+4:30

Shinkot (Pashto: شين کوټ) (also Pasaband) is a town and the center of Pasaband District, in the southern part of Ghor province, Afghanistan. It is located in the western part of the district at 33.6908°N 64.8564°E at 2,566 m altitude, and is close to the border with Helmand Province.

== Climate ==
Shinkot has a humid continental climate (Köppen: Dsb) with warm, dry summers and cold, snowy winters.

Climate data for Shinkot, Pasaband District
Month	Jan	Feb	Mar	Apr	May	Jun	Jul	Aug	Sep	Oct	Nov	Dec	Year
Mean daily maximum °C (°F)	−1.4 (29.5)	1.0 (33.8)	8.7 (47.7)	16.3 (61.3)	20.3 (68.5)	24.8 (76.6)	26.6 (79.9)	25.9 (78.6)	21.3 (70.3)	15.7 (60.3)	9.2 (48.6)	2.5 (36.5)	14.2 (57.6)
Daily mean °C (°F)	−9.7 (14.5)	−7.3 (18.9)	0.4 (32.7)	8.0 (46.4)	12.0 (53.6)	16.5 (61.7)	18.3 (64.9)	17.6 (63.7)	13.0 (55.4)	7.4 (45.3)	0.9 (33.6)	−5.8 (21.6)	5.9 (42.7)
Mean daily minimum °C (°F)	−18.0 (−0.4)	−15.6 (3.9)	−7.9 (17.8)	−0.3 (31.5)	3.7 (38.7)	8.2 (46.8)	10.0 (50.0)	9.3 (48.7)	4.7 (40.5)	−0.9 (30.4)	−7.4 (18.7)	−14.1 (6.6)	−2.4 (27.8)
Average precipitation mm (inches)	40.1 (1.58)	74.7 (2.94)	74.0 (2.91)	71.3 (2.81)	48.9 (1.93)	2.5 (0.10)	0.1 (0.00)	0.3 (0.01)	0.8 (0.03)	12.8 (0.50)	37.6 (1.48)	18.5 (0.73)	381.6 (15.02)
Average relative humidity (%)	70	78	65	45	37	25	22	23	24	31	47	53	43
Source 1: Nomadseason, NASA Power (Extremes)
Source 2: World Weather Online (Precipitation & Humidity)

== See also ==
- List of cities in Afghanistan
