= Hasan Khēl =

Coordinates: 32°12′32″N 66°40′19″E

Hasan Khel (Pashto: حسن خېل) (also written as Hasan Kheyl) is a town in Zabul Province, Afghanistan. The Hasan khel tribe are native to it, being a famous sub branch of royal Muhammadzai tribe.

== See also ==
- Zabul Province
