= Pasaband District =

Pasaband پسابند
- District
- Location within Afghanistan
- Coordinates: 33°41′27″N 64°51′23″E
- Country: Afghanistan
- Province: Ghor
- Center: Shinkot

Area
  - Total: 4,537 km^{2} (1,752 sq mi)
- Elevation: 2,450 m (8,040 ft)

Population (2012)
  - Total: 92,900

Pasaband District is located in Ghor province, Afghanistan. The population is 92,900 (84% Tajik, 11% Pashtun, and 5% Hazara). Located in the southern part of Ghor province, Pasaband District borders Helmand province to the south, Daykundi province to the east, and Farah province to the southwest. The district center is Shinkot.

Pasaband is a mountainous district where winters are long and severe. Roads are not in good condition and some villages are accessible only using animals. Because of the inaccessibility of villages and the few wells, the people's access to clean water is a major problem. Agriculture is the main source of income and it is seriously affected by drought. The health and education need improvement.

== Economy ==
The district suffers from a weak economy due to lack of access to basic health, social and infrastructure services, low agricultural and livestock production levels and quality, and weak performance of local government administrations.

- Agricultural: wheat, barley, maize, onion, carrot and turnips.
- Handicrafts: carpet and rug weaving, tailoring and embroidery.

== Healthcare ==
With their weak economy, Ghor struggles to provide adequate access to healthcare services. The government claims this province has not experienced balanced development and continue to face challenges with Talibans return to power in Afghanistan. Additionally, due to being one of the mountainous provinces of Afghanistan, Ghor suffers from impassable transportation routes, cutting off trade in the winter months.
