= Wanetsi =

Language spoken in northeastern Balochistan

- وڼېڅي
- Native to: Pakistan
- Region: Balochistan
- Ethnicity: Pakistanns
- Native speakers: 150,000 (2020)
- Language family: Indo-European: Indo-Iranian; Iranian; Southeastern; Pashto–Wanetsi; Wanetsi
- Writing system: Pashto alphabet

Language codes
- ISO 639-3: wne
- Glottolog: wane1241

Waṇetsi (Wanetsi: وڼېڅي), also called Tarīno (Wanetsi: ترينو) and sometimes Tsalgari (Wanetsi: څلګري), is an eastern Iranian language that is spoken mainly in northern regions of the Balochistan province of Pakistan. It is sometimes considered a distinct variety of Pashto and perhaps is a representation of a more archaic, or very early, form of Pashto. In some cases, Wanetsi shares similarities with the Pamir language of Munji, being a sort of bridge between the former and Pashto. However, Wanetsi is generally unintelligible to Pashto speakers.

It is spoken by the Tareen in Balochistan, Pakistan, primarily in Harnai (هرنای) (Harnai District) and Chawter (چوتېر) area in Sanjawi, northern Balochistan, Pakistan. The language is at risk of extinction due to lack of attention and a perception that it is a language of foreigners.

== History ==
Professor Prods Oktor Skjærvø states:

"The Pashto area split into two dialect groups at a pre-literary period, represented today on the one hand by all the dialects of modern Pashto and on the other by Waṇeci and by archaic remains in other Southeast dialects"

— page 386

According to Encyclopædia Iranica Waṇetsi branched off from the other Pashto dialects in the Middle Iranian stage:

Some of Waṇetsi's particularities (e.g. šwī “twenty,” mōš “we,” [a]γa “of;” the pres. endings; retention of rž; loss of -t-) prove that it must have split off from Paṣ̌to at an early Middle Iranic stage, considerably before the constitution of a standard Paṣ̌to. They can scarcely have developed after the arrival of the Waṇetsi speakers in their present home, which is in no way topographically cut off from the rest of Paṣ̌to territory. These speakers must rather represent the forerunners of the main Paṣ̌tūn movement towards the east, but when and where they split off is at present impossible to say.

— Section F.

=== Research ===
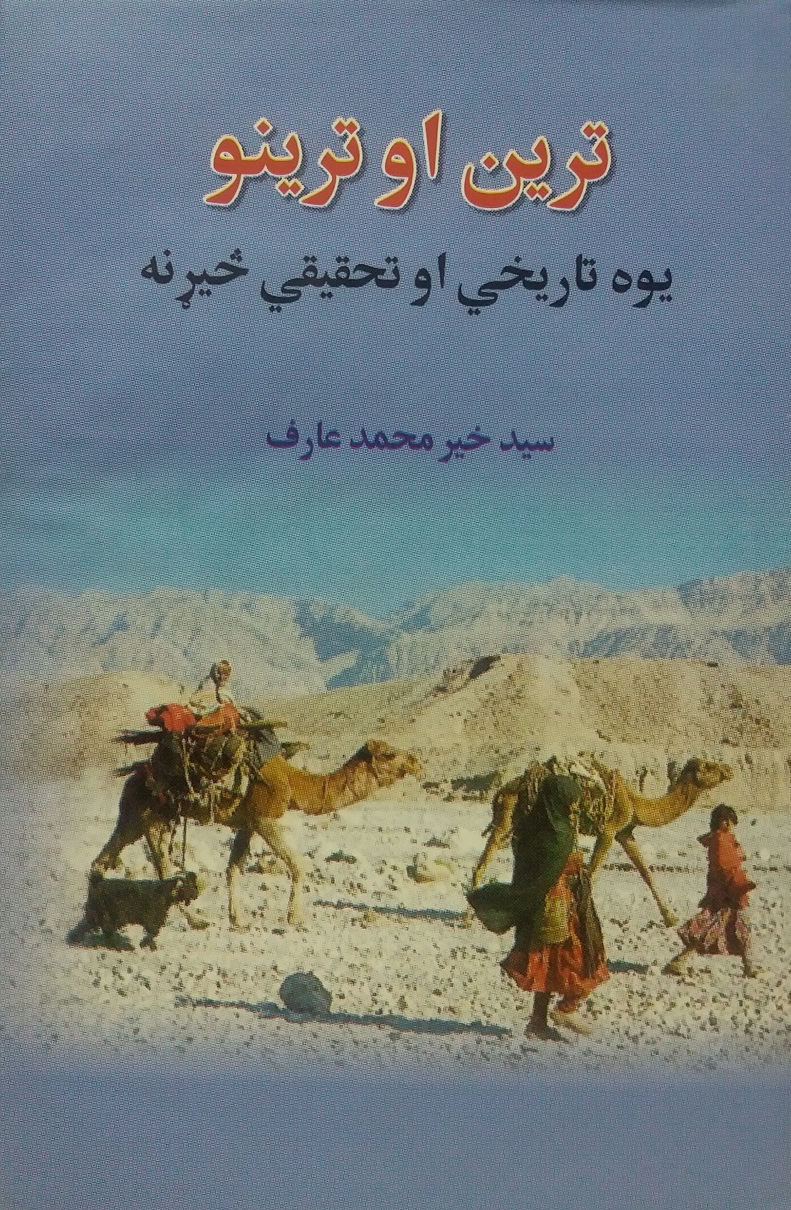
ترين او ترينو

The first known linguistic research on Waṇetsi was conducted in 1929 by Georg Morgenstierne. Since then linguists like Josef Elfenbein have worked and researched on this archaic Pashto dialect. In his book "Tarin aw Tarīno", Syed Khair Muhammad Arif has also included a small dictionary of Waṇetsi. ٙBut much work remains to be done on understanding Waṇetsi.

=== Poetry ===
Tareeno Poem
Recited by Nizamuddin Nizami

The Waṇetsi Poet Nizamuddin Nizami Tarin, a Spin Tarin from Chawter, has also compiled poetry in the language. An excerpt from his poem in Waṇetsi:

نيکۀ څېنه بړ سړا ده څۀ اړ توني چي بسيا ده
خپل وېل مندې دې پای او خپله توره یې ساتیا ده
پیني چرته رسېده ده موش ته پاته اومبې پلا ده
یه وږده توره تارۀ ده پچي هر خپل پرېدا ده
شپون ولس د کوڼ و کونګ ده هر سړا ځان ته بلا ده
نۀ ډاکتر او نۀ طبیب سته با څانګال ده شېخ راغا ده
خپل وطن مو خوارې ورېزې بېل داڼځوني پورې نا ده
دا ورسو ځنګل یه لغ سوه مندې وور نسته وګا ده
موش اوبۀ دې سپه ته خېزين وريځ سته ورکه تنا ده
دا وطنه مرغان ورک سو څۀ ښکار ده که وبا ده
با اغېنه سوړ چوتېر ده با اغه سړه هوا ده
بالمي صدۍ میر خوت ده تا لا اغل شا شوریا ده
راسه ژوېږ که زان ساماکه خيلک ټول سو ده څه دنیا ده
داڅې قبر یې هوار سو ده دا ښاغله تا ابا ده
تر هر چا یه یې مسېر تاغه لوړه جګه خوا ده
ته لا تروسه چرته ورک یې کم پهار ده کم ګړا ده
هله پورته سه لغ وریش سه بې تعلیمه کام تبا ده
ما-و-تا مي پرېدي سوو داني ورېز دا ده راغیا ده
څه بې تا يه يو جټ نۀ وي دا ده هر جټ مې بې تا ده
تا څه خولې يه اېله کړ نظامي ګونه هريا ده

— نظام الدین نظامي ترين
Translation:

How strong/capable grandfather is, that in a hill-locked place [lit. tied place] he is prosperous.
That on his own sustenance he survives, he has kept his own bravery [lit. sword].
The world has reached where [advanced], how much of a journey we have left for us.
There is a long darkness, in it every relative is a stranger.
The shephard nation is blind and dumb, every man is a constitution to oneself.
Neither is their a doctor nor a traditional-doctor, there is a tsāngā́l [an animal-sacrifice conducted to ward off evil], the sacrificer [lit.holyman] has come.
Our own land on a wretched day, till there is no bel-dāndzuṇí [a confederation formed in defence; made up of different tribes].
These meadows have become barren [lit. shaved-off] than a wasteland, on it there is no rain: there is wind.
Our water is climbing down, there are clouds: lost is the thunder.
From this country birds are lost, is it the hunt or the plague.
Again it is like that cold Chawter, again that cold air.
The preceding century's sun has risen, you still like that are laying on your back.
Come make noise, make yourself known. People have gathered all around.
That whose grave has been flattened that gentlemen is your father
From everyone you are chief, your aspect is high and tall.
Yet till now where are you lost: which season is it, which hour.
Come-on go ahead wake-up a bit, without education a nation is destroyed.
Me and you have also become strangers, such a day has come
That from without you there was no moment, this every moment of mine is without you.
That you have left from reality, Nizami has lost sin.

==== Music ====
Khayam Tareen - Waṇetsi
A one minute interlude of a song in the Tareeno language; sung by Khayām Tareen [Harānai, Balochistān]

The singer Khayam Tareen (خيام ترين) has also sung songs in Waṇetsi.

== Phonology ==
=== Consonants ===
		Labial	Denti- alveolar	Alveolar	Retroflex	Post- alveolar	Palatal	Velar	Uvular/ Glottal
Nasal		m		n	ɳ			ŋ	
Plosive	voiceless	p	t̪		ʈ			k	
Plosive	voiced	b	d̪		ɖ			ɡ	
Affricate	voiceless			t͡s		t͡ʃ			
Affricate	voiced			d͡z		d͡ʒ			
Flap					ɽ				
Fricative	voiceless			s		ʃ		x	h
Fricative	voiced			z		ʒ		ɣ	
Approximant				l			j	w	
Rhotic				r					

- Waṇetsi has [ʃ] and [ʒ] for Pashto ښ and ږ, respectively.
- څ does not merge with [s] but can be pronounced as [t͡s] and ځ does not merge with [z] but can be pronounced as [d͡z].
- [h] is dropable in Waṇetsi e.g. هغه becomes اغه

=== Vowels ===
	Front	Central	Back
Close	i		u
Mid	e	ə	o
Open	a		ɑ

- Josef Elfenbein states: "ī and ū are not phonemically distinct from i and u respectively, and are pronounced [i] and [u] respectively when unstressed (and not [ɪ] and [ʊ] as in Kākaṛī), and [iː] and [uː] when stressed."
- There is a marked spontaneous tendency to palatalize "ī" as "yī" and "ē" as "yē"; and to labialize "ū" as "wū" and "ō" as "wo". Initial delabialization is common in "wū" as "ū" and "wō" as "ō".
- The stressed short "á" is often lengthened, and an unstressed long "ā" shortened.
- The standard weakening of final vowels in Waṇetsi makes the masculine-feminine gender distinction much less audible: [ə] and [a] are not phonemically distinct when unstressed in any position. But stressed final ә́ is kept apart from stressed á as in general Pashto.

==== Nasalisation ====
Nasalisation
میاں
/mjɑ̃/

بويں
/buĩ/

مويں
/muĩ/

Waṇetsi also has vowel nasalisation which is transcribed as / ̃/ or ں in the Pashto alphabet.

=== Stress ===
==== Verbs ====
Like Pashto, verbs have final stress in the imperfective aspect and initial stress in the perfective aspect.

Imperfective (mostly Final Stress)	Meaning	Perfective (Initial Stress)	Meaning
چينستي čīnastī́	I was sitting	چينستي čī́nastī	I sat down

Examples:

Verb Stress
Tareeno - Imperfective Aspect

Pashto - Imperfective Aspect

Tareeno - Perfective Aspect

Pashto - Perfective Aspect

Examples
	Waṇetsi	Southeastern Pashto	Translation
Impefective (čīnastī́)	زې چينستي خو اغه راغيا	زه کښېناستم خو هغه راغله	I was sitting [or about to sit] that she came
Impefective (čīnastī́)	ze čīnastī́ xo áğa rā́ğyā	zə kšenāstə́m xo hağá rā́ğla	I was sitting [or about to sit] that she came
Perfective (čī́nastī)	زې چينستي	زه کښېناستم	I sat
Perfective (čī́nastī)	ze čī́nasti	zə kšénāstəm	I sat

==== Words ====
Stress can also change the meaning of words, as in Pashto.

Example:

Word Stress: Example
jṓṛa [well; agreement]

jōṛá [pair

Word	IPA: following general stress pattern [penultimate syllable]	Meaning 1	IPA: following exception stress pattern	Meaning 2
جوړه	/ˈd͡ʒoː.ɽa/	well/healthy [feminine]; agreement/peace	/d͡ʒoː.ˈɽa/	a pair
Transliteration	jṓṛa	well/healthy [feminine]; agreement/peace	jōṛá	a pair

== Subdialects ==
Tarīno is subdivided into the Harnāi variety and the Chawter variety.

== Grammatical comparison with general Pashto ==
=== Adpositions ===
==== Possessive ====
The possessive postposition غه is used instead of د

Waṇetsi	General Pashto	Translation
غه ğa (postposition)	د dә (preposition)	of

Example:

	Waṇetsi	Southeastern	Meaning
Sentence	اندي وګړي چي موش پيار غه څټ لېژدي وي	په دې کلي کې زموږ د پلار ډېر غويان وو	In this village our father had many bulls.
Sentence	indī́ wagaṛī́ čī moš pyār ğa tsaṭ leždī́ wī	pə de kə́li ke zmuž də plār ḍer ğwayā́n wu	In this village our father had many bulls.

=== Idiomatic Expression ===
Tareeno also varies from Pashto in idiomatic expression.

Example:

Idiomatic Expression - Example
Nahī́r

Tareeno Sentence

Pashto Sentence

نهير^{1} /nahī́r/ “thought” - used with the verb to hit

Tareeno	Southeastern Pashto	Meaning
ته دا نهير وله	ته داسې سوچ وکړه	Think like this
tə dā nahīr wū́la	ته داسې سوچ وکړه	Think like this
you this thought hit [imperative]	you like-this thought do [imperative]	Think like this

=== Verbal Suffixes ===
==== First Person Suffix ====
The first person verbal suffixes also change:

Waṇetsi	Pashto	Translation	Change noted
زې کي ze ki	زه کوم zә kawә́m	I do	م ← ي i ←әm
زې وايي ze wāyi	زه وايم zә wāyә́m	I say	م ← ي i ←әm

==== Second Person Suffix ====
Feminine Second Person
د يوګړي دپاره وياړه او د ډېرګړي دپار وياړې Translation: For the singular: "wyā́ra" and for the plural "wyā́re"

Some verbal suffixes like the feminine third person suffix [ه and ې] are the same:

Waṇetsi	Pashto	Translation
وياړه wyā́ṛa	لاړه lā́ṛa	She went
go:Aorist:Past:3Person:Singular:Feminine		She went
وياړې wyā́re	لاړې lā́re	They [females] went
go:Aorist:Past:3Person:Plural:Feminine		They [females] went

==== Third Person Suffix ====
===== Past Suffix =====
Like standard Pashto the third person suffix for verbs with the root وتل the third person past suffix is different for the singular and plural.

Waṇetsi	Meaning	Standard
دغه سړا وته چووت dága saṛá watə čə́wot	that man entered it	دغه سړی ور ته ننووت dága saṛáy war tə nə́nawot
دغه سړي وته چواته dága saṛí watə čə́wātə	those men entered it	دغه سړی ور ته ننواته dága saṛí war tə nə́nātə

== Comparison with general Pashto ==
=== Poetry ===
The following is provided by Zamir Gulbahar (ظمير ګلبهار), a Tareeno poet from Harnai:

Waṇetsi

دلته مزي کزي کار ده
يو بي خولې ګولې دې کانين
پرېدي خلک' دې څه کې'
خپل خپلوان دې يو بي نانين
څه مټانو چي زور وين
اغه خلک ټول پوره دي
څه نستمن وين لايګړ وين
اغه خلک ټول ماندۀ دي
دا بې مايله خلک وکسه
يو بي کاپن دې کانين
دلته ټول تلهټ تلهټ دي
که خواران دي که مال دار دي
نه ې يې ګړي ډکتوب سته
ټول روپيو پلس ګار دي
بس دغه ډول خلک خوش دي
بس دغني زوند دې نانين
هر سړا هړکې هړکې ده
ټولو خلکو کا هبره ده
شور ده زونګه دې لګيا دي
هر سړي غه کار ماندۀ ده
زې دا وايي که دا زوند وين
بس دغني زوند دې ما نين
سدو بدو وسره نسته
څه دا کمې خوا روان دي
يو بي هګا نه دي
بس زوېندي بنديګانان دي
ګلبهاره ټول بې خوش سين
که يو بي ته څه لار وانين

Translation:
Pashto

دلته زورور او کمزوری کار دی
د يو بل خولې څخه خواړۀ کاږي
پردي خلک' څه کوې'
خپل خپلوان يو بل نه پرېږدي
چې په مټو کې زور لري
هغه خلک ګړد پوره دي
چې بې وسه وي بې کسه (لا يوازی) وي
هغه خلک ټول ماندۀ دي
دا بې مينې خلک وګوره
د يو بل څخه پرده اخلي
دلته ګړد ستړي ستومانه دي
که خواران دي که مال دار دي
نه يې يو ساعت مړېدۀ شته
ګړد په پيسو پسې ورک دي
بس دغه شان خلک خوښ دي
بس دغه شان ژوند نه پرېږدي
هر سړی په تعضيله دی
ټولو خلکو کړی بې صبري ده
شور دی غوغه ده غوبل دی
د هر سړي کار ماندۀ دی
زه دا واييم که دغه ژوند وي
بس دغه شان ژوند دې زما نه وي
دا درک ور سره نشته
دوی په کومې خوا روان دي
له يو بل څخه خبر نه دي
هسې ژوندي انسانان دي
ګلبهاره ګړد به خوشحاله شي
که يو بل ته څه نه څه لار پرېږدي

=== Lexical Comparison ===
The following list has been provided by the Waṇetsi poet Nizamuddin Nizami

Waṇetsi Pashto		Southeastern Pashto	Meaning
تره ژمي	taražmī́	ترژومۍ	the time of the evening where the darkness has not been fully come; the night where the moon is hidden
غوبله	ğūblə́	قبله	Kiblah
لهه	láha	شېله	a watercourse in which rain water flows and ultimately joins a river
لهړ	laháṛ	مانده	weak; tired
ژله	žə́la	ږغل	sludge, gravel
کولي	kūlí	کوډل	shack
پرڅله	partsála	برنډه	veranda
ګوګ	gōg	روشندان	roshandan; combined skylight and ventilating window.
ارغولا	arğōlá	لنګر	kitchen
غوله	ğṓla	صحن	patio
اربوی	orbṓy	هوېلي	haveli
درګه	dárga	دروازه/وړ	door
لېښت	lešt	لښته	stick
کاوي	kā́wi	لوښي	dishes
غاب	ğāb	ټولګي	plate
منګوټا	mangōṭá	کټو	cooking pot
چمچره	čimčarə́	کشهغه	spoon
کړېڅي	kṛetsí	د لرګي چمچي	a wooden spon
شپې تنا	špe tə̃ná	د شپې ځای	the place for the night
رېبون	rebún	قميص	shirt
بخڅه	buxtsə́	بوتوه	purse
لاس وينځونه	lās winzū́na	واشبېسن, سلمچي	washbasin
ګوډي	guḍī́	غړک	the handle for the press used to make buttermilk
بدني	badnī́	لوټه	a small jug/bucket
دنګ	dang	بوتل	bottle
مېژوا	mežwá	مېژوی	peg; tethering post; tied on a horse
خولبزه	xōlbáza	سرپوښ	lid, dish cover
لېڅکي	letskí	پرړه	rope
تبخا	tabxá	ټګونه	a flat pan
منګا	mangá	منګی	earthenware waterpot
رنګلون	ranglū́n	د رنګ لوټه	a container for colour
وړکې	waṛáke	وړۍ	wool
پوړدګ	pōrdág	پرتوګ	pant
پاخلې	pā́xle	پایڅې	the openings of a pant near the ankle; cuffs/hems
پټکا	paṭká	پټکی	turban
ییر	yayə́r	راشن	ration
غوړنه	ğwaṛə́na	کتنپلاوی	overseer/oversight
توڼه	tū́ṇa	بازار	market

=== Sentence Comparison ===
==== Sample 1 ====
Sentence Comparison: Sample 1
Sentence 1: Wanetsi
خور کو مې اغه توني ته نزدې ده

Sentence 1: Southeastern
د خور کور مې هغې ځای ته نژدې دی

Sentence 2: Wanetsi
زې اوبه غوزي

Sentence 2: Southeastern
زه اوبه څښم

Sentence 3: Wanetsi
موش څه غندم وکورو بیار بې وته درمو

Sentence 3: Southeastern
موږ چې غنم وکرو نو بيا به ورځو

Sentence 4: Wanetsi
ته غره یې کوز سه بیار به دې وسره خبرې وکي

Sentence 4: Southeastern
ته د غرۀ نه راکوشه نو بيا به در سره خبررې وکړم

Sentence 5: Wanetsi
آ چوره دې لونډه خوره

Sentence 5: Southeastern
هغه نجلۍ ډوډۍ خوري

Sentence 6: Wanetsi
ما لوشي واخسته

Sentence 6: Southeastern
ما جامې واغستې

Sentence 7: Wanetsi
ته بي ښار ته ویاړې

Sentence 7: Southeastern
ته بل ښار ته لاړې

Sentence 8: Wanetsi
زمي چي دلته واوره ورېده

Sentence 8: Southeastern
ژمي کې دلته واوره ورېده

Sentence 9: Wanetsi
مور یې مچنې ډلي

Sentence 9: Southeastern
مور يې مېچنې ګرځولې

Sentence 10: Wanetsi
ما واده چي لبه که

Sentence 10: Southeastern
زه ګډېدم په وادۀ کې

Sentence 11: Wanetsi
ته بډا سوې

Sentence 11: Southeastern
ته بوډه شوې

Sentence 12: Wanetsi
اغه ښځې اندي توني يه اورته ویاړه

Sentence 12: Southeastern
هغه ښځه دې ځاي نه هلته لاړه

The following examples have been provided by Nizamuddin Nizami

Sample 1
Sentence No. [for corresponding audio]	Waṇetsi	General [Southeastern Pashto accent]	Translation
1	خور کور مې اغه توني ته نزدې ده	د خور کور مې هغې ځای ته نژدې دی	My sister's house is near to that place
1	xūr kōr me áğa tūni tə nizdé da	də xor kor me háğe dzāy tə niždé day	My sister's house is near to that place
2	زې اوبه غوزي	زه اوبه څښم	I am drinking water
2	ze obə́ ğozí	zə obə́ čšə́m	I am drinking water
3	موش څه غندم وکورو بیار بې وته درمو	موږ چې غنم وکرو نو بيا به ورځو	Once we plant the wheat, then we will go [to them]
3	moš tsə ğandə́m wə́ kōru byār be watə dramū́	muž če ğanə́m wə́ karu no byā ba war dzú	Once we plant the wheat, then we will go [to them]
4	ته غره یې کوز سه بیار به دې وسره خبرې وکي	ته د غرۀ نه راکوشه نو بيا به در سره خبررې وکړم	You come down from the mountain, then i will talk to you
4	tə ğrə ye kū́z sa byār bə de wasará xabə́re wə́ kī	tə də ğrə na rā́kuša no byā bə dar sará xabə́re wə́ kṛam	You come down from the mountain, then i will talk to you
5	آ چوره دې لونډه خوره	هغه نجلۍ ډوډۍ خوري	That girl over there is eating food
5	ā čwára de lū́nḍa xwrə́	háğa njalə́i ḍoḍə́i xwri	That girl over there is eating food
6	ما لوشي واخسته	ما جامې واغستې	I wore clothes
6	mā lōší wā́xstə	mā jāmé wāğaste	I wore clothes
7	ته بي ښار ته ویاړې	ته بل ښار ته لاړې	You went to anothercity
7	tə bi šār tə wyā́ṛe	tə bəl šār tə lā́ṛe	You went to anothercity
8	زمي چي دلته واوره ورېده	ژمي کې دلته واوره ورېده	In winter it was snowing here
8	zə́mi či də́lta wā́wra waredá	žə́mi ke də́lta wā́wra waredá	In winter it was snowing here
9	مور یې مچنې ډلي	مور يې مېچنې ګرځولې	His/her/there mother was working the hand-mills
9	mor ye mečə́ne ḍalī́	mor ye mečə́ne gardzawlé	His/her/there mother was working the hand-mills
10	ما واده چي لبه که	زه ګډېدم په وادۀ کې	I was dancing in the wedding
10	mā wādə́ či lába ká	zə gaḍedə́m pə wādə́ ke	I was dancing in the wedding
11	ته بډا سوې	ته بوډه شوې	You have become old
11	tə buḍā́ swe	tə budá šwe	You have become old
12	اغه ښځې اندي توني يه اورته ویاړه	هغه ښځه دې ځاي نه هلته لاړه	That woman went from this place to therere
12	áğa šə́dze indī́ tūní ya ortá wyā́ṛa	háğa šə́dza de dzáyi na hálta lā́ṛa	That woman went from this place to therere

==== Sample 2 ====
Sentence Comparison: Sample 2
Sentence 1: Wanetsi
کاډي وچلوه

Sentence 1: Southeastern
ګاډی وچلوه

Sentence 2: Wanetsi
ته اورته مه درمه

Sentence 2: Southeastern
ته هاغې خوا ته مه ځه

Sentence 3: Wanetsi
اور بلو ده که مړ

Sentence 3: Southeastern
اور بل دی که مړ

Sentence 4: Wanetsi
اغه خلک دې ارغولي اوره مندې کاوي چینه وین

Sentence 4: Southeastern
هغوی خلک د نغري په او ر لوښي اېږدي

Sentence 5: Wanetsi
درګه بند نه وي نو دغه سړه وته چوته

Sentence 5: Southeastern
ور بند نه و نو دغه سړی پې ور ننوتۀ

Sentence 6: Wanetsi
اس پرېووت

Sentence 6: Southeastern
اس پرېووت

Sentence 7: Wanetsi
څوړي لا وړې دي او نهړې دي داګایه دې نه سین الوتا

Sentence 7: Southeastern
مرغۍ لا وړې او کمزورې دي ځکه نه شي اوتلې

Sentence 8: Wanetsi
ونه دې پرې که ده

Sentence 8: Southeastern
ونه دې پرې کړې ده

Sentence 9: Wanetsi
اغه مځکې یه غندم ورېبه

Sentence 9: Southeastern
هغې ځمکې نه غنم ورېبه

Sentence 10: Wanetsi
څه ووړه تېر سه نو بې اسپې تا مندې خرڅې کي

Sentence 10: Southeastern
اوړي تېر شي نو اسپې به درباندې خرڅوم

Sentence 11: Wanetsi
تا کور کم وګړي چي ده

Sentence 11: Southeastern
ستا کو ر کوم کلي کې دی

Sentence 12: Wanetsi
دا چوره څو کالو غه ده

Sentence 12: Southeastern
دا نجلۍ د څو کالو ده

The following examples have been provided by Nizamuddin Nizami

Sample 2
Sentence No. [fore corresponding audio]	Waṇetsi	General [Southeastern Pashto accent]	Translation
1	کاډي وچلوه	ګاډی وچلوه	Drive the car
1	gā́di wə́ čalawa	gā́day wə́ čalawa	Drive the car
2	ته اورته مه درمه	ته هاغې خوا ته مه ځه	Don't go to that side [over there]
2	tə ortá mə́ dramá	tə háğe x̌wā tə mə́ dza	Don't go to that side [over there]
3	اور بلو ده که مړ	اور بل دی که مړ	Is the fire alight/burning or extinguished
3	awə́r baláw da kə maṛ	or bal day kə maṛ	Is the fire alight/burning or extinguished
4	اغه خلک دې ارغولي اوره مندې کاوي چینه وین	هغوی خلک د نغري په اور لوښي اېږدي	Those people keep dishware on hearth's fire
4	áğa xalák de arğōlí awrə́ məndé kā́wi čīna wī́n	hağúi xalák də nağarí pə or lóši iždí	Those people keep dishware on hearth's fire
5	درګه بند نه وي نو دغه سړا وته چوت	ور بند نه و نو دغه سړی پې ور ننوت	The door was not closed so the man entered [through it]
5	dárga band nə́ wi no dáğa saṛá watə čəwṓt	war band nə wə no dáğa saṛáy pe war nənawát	The door was not closed so the man entered [through it]
6	اس پرېووت	اس پرېووت	The horse feel
6	as préwōt	as préwot	The horse feel
7	څوړي لا وړې دي او نهړې دي داګایه دې نه سین الوتا	مرغۍ لا وړې او کمزورې دي ځکه نه شي اوتلې	The birds are yet small and weak they cannot fly
7	tsū́ṛi lā waṛé di aw nahṛé di dāgā́ya de nə́ sīn alwatā	marğə́i lā waṛé aw kamzóre di dzə́ka nə ši alwatə́le	The birds are yet small and weak they cannot fly
8	ونه دې پرې که ده	ونه دې پرې کړې ده	Have you cut the tree / You have cut the tree
8	wə́na de pré ka da	wə́na de pré kaṛe da	Have you cut the tree / You have cut the tree
9	اغه مځکې یه غندم ورېبه	هغې ځمکې نه غنم ورېبه	Reap wheat from that land
9	ága mdzə́ke ya ğandə́m wə́ reba	háğe dzmə́ke na ğanə́m wə́ reba	Reap wheat from that land
10	څه ووړه تېر سه نو بې اسپې تا مندې خرڅې کي	اوړي تېر شي نو اسپې به در باندې خرڅوم	Let the summer pass then I will sell the horse on you
10	tsə wōṛá ter sa no be áspe tā mənde xartse kí	óri ter ši no áspe bə dar bā́nde xartsawə́m	Let the summer pass then I will sell the horse on you
11	تا کور کم وګړي چي ده	ستا کور کوم کلي کې دی	In which village is your house
11	tā kor kam wagaṛī́ či da	stā kor kom kə́li ke day	In which village is your house
12	دا چوره څو کالو غه ده	دا نجلۍ د څو کالو ده	How old is this girl
12	dā čwára tso kā́lo ğa da	dā njlə́i də tso kā́lo da	How old is this girl

==== Sample 3 ====
Sentence Comparison: Sample 3
Sentence 1: Wanetsi
ته چرې یې

Sentence 1: Southeastern
ته چېرته يې

Sentence 2: Wanetsi
دغه خوا یه راغا

Sentence 2: Southeastern
دغې خوا نه راغی

Sentence 3: Wanetsi
که تاس ویو او موش ویو نو بې هېڅ نه سین

Sentence 3: Southeastern
که تاسو يئ او مو ږ يو نو هيڅ به نه کېږي

Sentence 4: Wanetsi
میر ما مخ ته ده

Sentence 4: Southeastern
لمر زما مخې ته دی

Sentence 5: Wanetsi
اغه چوره څه لویه سین نو اله بې وته واک سپاري

Sentence 5: Southeastern
هغه هلک چې لوی شي نو هله به ورته دا واک سپارم

Sentence 6: Wanetsi
دا دریاب چي پارند بېړي ډبه سوه

Sentence 6: Southeastern
په دې سيند کې پرون بېړۍ ډوبه شوه

Sentence 7: Wanetsi
سېبه درختو چي پیخه سو

Sentence 7: Southeastern
مڼې په ونو کې پخې شوې

Sentence 8: Wanetsi
سېبه دې درختو چي پیخه سین.

Sentence 8: Southeastern
مڼې په ونې کې پخېږي

Sentence 9: Wanetsi
زې لا اورته نه یي ید څه ویاړسي تاته بې اوایي

Sentence 9: Southeastern
زه لا هلته نه يم تللی چې لاړشم تا ته به وويم

Sentence 10: Wanetsi
سترګې یې شنې دي

Sentence 10: Southeastern
سترګې یې شنې دي

Sentence 11: Wanetsi
تر یه دوه درې څلورو پورې دې خالي ویا سي

Sentence 11: Southeastern
تر يو دوه درې څلور پورې تش ویلی شم

Sentence 12: Wanetsi
داکپړه سره او کربي ده

Sentence 12: Southeastern
دا کپړه سره او ښکلې ده

The following examples have been provided by Nizamuddin Nizami

Sentence No. [fore corresponding audio]	Waṇetsi	General [Southeastern Pashto accent]	Translation
1	ته چرې یې	ته چېرته يې	Where are you
1	tə čáre ye	tə čérta ye	Where are you
2	دغه خوا یه راغا	دغې خوا نه راغی	He came from that direction
2	dága xwā ya rā́ğā	dáğe xwā na rā́ğay	He came from that direction
3	که تاس ویو او موش ویو نو بې هېڅ نه سین	که تاسو يئ او موږ يو نو هيڅ به نه کېږي	If you are there and we are there nothing will happen
3	kə tās wyō aw moš wyū no be hets nə sī́n	kə tā́so yəi aw muž yu no hits bə nə kéži	If you are there and we are there nothing will happen
4	میر ما مخ ته ده	لمر زما مخې ته دی	The sun is to my front
4	mīr mā məx tə da	lmar zmā mə́xe tə day	The sun is to my front
5	اغه چوره څه لویه سین نو اله بې وته واک سپاري	هغه هلک چې لوی شي نو هله به ورته دا واک سپارم	When that boy grows up then I will entrust with this authority
5	áğa čorá tsə lōyá sīn no ála be watə wāk spāri	háğa halə́k če loy ši no hála bə war tə dā wāk spārə́m	When that boy grows up then I will entrust with this authority
6	دا دریاب چي پارند بېړي ډبه سوه	په دې سيند کې پرون بېړۍ ډوبه شوه	In this river, yesterday a ship sank
6	dā daryā́b či pārə́nd beṛi ḍə́ba swa	pə de sind ke parún beṛə́i ḍúba šwa	In this river, yesterday a ship sank
7	سېبه درختو چي پیخه سو	مڼې په ونو کې پخې شوې	The apples ripened in the trees
7	sebə́ dəraxtó či pīxə́ su	maṇé pə wə́no ke paxé šwe	The apples ripened in the trees
8	سېبه دې درختو چي پیخه سین	مڼې په ونې کې پخېږي	The apples are ripening in the trees
8	sebə́ de dəraxtó či pīxə sī́n	maṇé pə wə́ne ke paxéži	The apples are ripening in the trees
9	زې لا اورته نه یي ید څه ویاړسي تا ته بې اوایي	زه لا هلته نه يم تللی چې لاړشم تا ته به وويم	I have not gone there yet when I go I will tell you
9	ze lā ortá nə yi yad tsə wyāṛsī́ tā tə be uwayī́	za lā hálta nə yam tlə́lay če lā́ṛšam tā tə bə wə́ wayəm	I have not gone there yet when I go I will tell you
10	سترګې ېې شنې دي	سترګې ېې شنې دي	His/her eyes are green
10	stə́rge ye šne dī	stə́rge ye šne di	His/her eyes are green
11	تر یه دوه درې څلورو پورې دې خالي ویا سي	تر يو دوه درې څلور پورې تش ویلی شم	I cam only say till one two three
11	tər yə duə dre tsalór póre de xālí wayā́ si	tər yaw dwa dre tsalór póre taš wayə́lay šam	I cam only say till one two three
12	دا کپړه سره او کربي ده	دا کپړه سره او ښکلې ده	This cloth is red and beautiful
12	dā kapṛá sra aw kə́rbī da	dā kapṛá sra aw škʊ́le da	This cloth is red and beautiful

==== Sample 4 ====
Sentence Comparison: Sample 4
Sentence 1: Wanetsi
میر دې دو ګوتو پورې نس پټ

Sentence 1: Southeastern
لمر په دوو ګوتو نه پټېږي

Sentence 2: Wanetsi
سونډې مندې مېچ مه انه (مانه)

Sentence 2: Southeastern
په پوزې مچ مه پرېږده

Sentence 3: Wanetsi
غوا یې ولوېسیا بیار یې پرې وښه اوخواړ

Sentence 3: Southeastern
غوا يې ولوشله او بيا يې پرې واښه وخوړل

Sentence 4: Wanetsi
آ اورې چرګانو هویې واچې

Sentence 4: Southeastern
هاغو {لرې خوا ته} چرګانو هګۍ واچولې

Sentence 5: Wanetsi
ته ځنې څو جګ یې

Sentence 5: Southeastern
ته ترې څونه دنګ يې

Sentence 6: Wanetsi
دومبې سوچه مه وله

Sentence 6: Southeastern
دومره سوچونه مه کوه

Sentence 7: Wanetsi
ګامېښې دې ورسو چي غړېږین

Sentence 7: Southeastern
مېښې دې ورشو کښې څرېدې

Sentence 8: Wanetsi
څپلي / چپړکې شپوکې که نا

Sentence 8: Southeastern
څپلۍ/چپړې اغوندې که نه څپلۍ / چپړې په پښو کوې که نه

Sentence 9: Wanetsi
اغې رېبون ونغاړي

Sentence 9: Southeastern
هغې کميس ونغښتۀ

Sentence 10: Wanetsi
رېبنان ونغاړه

Sentence 10: Southeastern
کميسونه ونغاړه

Sentence 11: Wanetsi
ترژه ده او کهل مي ده

Sentence 11: Southeastern
تږی دی او ستړی هم دی

Sentence 12: Wanetsi
تا حق خالي خپل کار لا کړنګ ته ده کله مي کار مېوې ته نه

Sentence 12: Southeastern
ستا حق تش خپل کار يا کړنې ته دی کله هم د کار مېوې ته نه

The following examples have been provided by Nizamuddin Nizami

Sentence No. [fore corresponding audio]	Waṇetsi	General [Southeastern Pashto accent]	Translation
1	میر دې دو ګوتو پورې نس پټ	لمر په دوو ګوتو نه پټېږي	The sun does not hide by two fingers [a matal]
1	mīr de dwū/dū gwə́to pṓre nə́s paṭ	lmar dwo gwə́to nə́ paṭéži	The sun does not hide by two fingers [a matal]
2	سونډې مندې مېچ مه انه (مانه)	په پوزې مچ مه پرېږده	Don't let a fly on your nose [a matal]
2	sū́nḍe mə́nde meč mə́ ana [mā́na]	pə póza məč mə́ prežda	Don't let a fly on your nose [a matal]
3	غوا یې ولوېسیا بیار یې پرې وښه اوخواړ	غوا يې ولوشله او بيا يې پرې واښه وخوړل	He/she milked the cow and then he/she made it eat hay/herbage
3	ğwā ye wə́ lwesyā byār ye pre wašə́ ō-xwāṛ	ğwā ye wə́ lwəšəla aw byā ye pre wāšə́ wə́ xwaṛəl	He/she milked the cow and then he/she made it eat hay/herbage
4	آ اورې چرګانو هویې واچې	هاغو لرې خوا ته چرګانو هګۍ واچولې	The sun is to my front
4	ā ōre čərgā́no hóye wā́če	hā́ğo lə́re xwā tə čərgā́no hagə́i wā́čawəle	The sun is to my front
5	ته ځنې څو جګ یې	ته ترې څونه دنګ يې	From him/her how tall are you
5	tə dzə́ne tso jəg ye	tə tre tsóna dəng ye	From him/her how tall are you
6	دومبې سوچه مه وله	دومره سوچونه مه کوه	Don't think so much
6	dṓmbe sočə́ mə́ wula	dū́mra sočū́na mə́ kawa	Don't think so much
7	ګامېښې دې ورسو چي غړېږین	مېښې دې ورشو کښې څرېدې	[Your] buffalos [feminine] were grazing in the pasture
7	gāméše de warsṓ cī gaṛežī́n	méše de waršó kše tsaredé	[Your] buffalos [feminine] were grazing in the pasture
8	څپلي / چپړکې شپوکې که نا	څپلۍ/چپړې اغوندې که نه also څپلۍ / چپړې په پښو کوې که نه	Are you wearing the slipper or no
8	tsaplī́ / čapṛáke špoké kə nā	tsaplə́i / čapáṛa ağundé kə nə also tsaplə́i / čapáṛa pə pšo kawé kə nə	Are you wearing the slipper or no
9	اغې رېبون ونغاړي	هغې کميس ونغښتۀ	She folded the shirt
9	áğe rebū́n wə́ nğāṛī	hağé kamís wə́ nğaštə	She folded the shirt
10	رېبنان ونغاړه	کميسونه ونغاړه	Fold the shirts
10	rebnā́n wə́ nğāṛa	kamísū́na wə́ nğāṛa	Fold the shirts
11	ترژه ده او کهل مي ده	تږی دی او ستړی هم دی	He is thirsty and also tired
11	tə́rža da aw kahál mī da	tə́žay day aw stə́ṛay ham day	He is thirsty and also tired
12	تا حق خالي خپل کار لا کړنګ ته ده کله مي کار مېوې ته نه	ستا حق تش خپل کار يا کړنې ته دی کله هم د کار مېوې ته نه	Your right is only to your own work or action never-ever to the fruit of action
12	tā hak xālī́ xpəl kār lā kṛang tə da kə́la mī kār mewé tə nə	stā hak taš xpəl kār yā kṛə́ne tə day kə́la ham də kār mewé tə nə	Your right is only to your own work or action never-ever to the fruit of action

== Grammar ==
=== Nouns - Morphology ===
==== Class 1 ====
- Masculine Animate: mə́ser - elder (In general Pashto: mə́sər

Waṇetsi
	Singular	Plural
Direct	mə́ser	məserā́n
Oblique	məserə́	mə́serā́no

- Masculine Animate: lewә́- wolf

Waṇetsi
	Singular	Plural
Direct	lewә́	lewā́n
Oblique	lewә́	lewā́no

- Masculine Animate: xar- donkey

	Singular	Plural
Direct	xar	xrā́n
Oblique	xrə́	xro

- Masculine Animate: pšə́ - tom-cat (in general Pashto: piš)

Waṇetsi
	Singular	Plural
Direct	pša	pšyā́n
Oblique	pšə́	pšyā́nū

- Masculine Inanimate: dārū́ - medicine

Waṇetsi
	Singular	Plural
Direct	dārū́	dārūwā́n
Oblique	dārūwē	dārūwo

- Masculine Inanimate: kor - house

Waṇetsi
	Singular	Plural
Direct	kor	korū́na
Oblique	korə́	korū́no

- Feminine Animate: pšī - cat (in general Pashto: piśó)

Waṇetsi
	Singular	Plural
Direct	pšī	pšyā́ne
Oblique	pše	pšyā́no

- Feminine Inanimate: lyār - way (in general Pashto: lār)

Waṇetsi
	Singular	Plural
Direct	lyār	lyā́re
Oblique	lyā́re	lyā́ro

- Feminine Inanimate: xwā́šī - mother-in-law

Waṇetsi
	Singular	Plural
Direct	xwā́šī	xwā́šī
Oblique	xwā́šī	xwāšó

- Feminine Inanimate: čaṛə́ - mother-in-law

Waṇetsi
	Singular	Plural
Direct	čaṛə́	čaṛī́
Oblique	čaṛī́	čaṛó

- Feminine Inanimate: lergā́ - stick

	Singular	Plural
Direct	lergā́	lergī́
Oblique	lergī́	lergó

==== Class 2 ====
- Masculine Animate: yirźá - bear (in general Pashto: يږ [yәẓ̌, yәg, yәź])

Waṇetsi
	Singular	Plural
Direct	yirźá	yirźiān
Oblique	yirźí	yirźío

- Masculine Animate: spa -dog (in general Pashto: spáy)

Waṇetsi
	Singular	Plural
Direct	spá	spiā́n
Oblique	spī́	spiā́no

- Masculine Inanimate: wagaṛá -village (in general Pashto: kə́lay)

Waṇetsi
	Singular	Plural
Direct	wagṛá	wagaṛyā́n
Oblique	wagaṛí	wagaṛyó

- Feminine Animate: spī - female-dog (in general Pashto spə́i)

Waṇetsi
	Singular	Plural
Direct	spī	spī
Oblique	spī	spīu

==== Class 3 ====
- Masculine Inanimate: špaźmi -moon (in general Pashto spoẓ̌mə́i, a feminine noun)

Waṇetsi
	Singular	Plural
Direct	شپږمي špaźmī́	špaźmí
Oblique	شپږمي špaźmī́	špaźmyó

- Feminine Inanimate: méle -celebration (in general Pashto melá)

Waṇetsi
	Singular	Plural
Direct	méle	méle
Oblique	méle	melyú

==== Class 4 ====
- Masculine Animate: spor- horseman

Waṇetsi
	Singular	Plural
Direct	spor	spārə́
Oblique	spārə́	spāró

- Masculine Inanimate: rebún - shirt

Waṇetsi
	Singular	Plural
Direct	rebún	rebnā́n
Oblique	rebnānə́	rebnā́no

==== Class 5 ====
- Masculine Animate: ğal

Waṇetsi
	Singular	Plural
Direct	ğal	ğlúnə
Oblique	ğlə	ğlunó

=== Agglutinative Formation ===
The (e)ya case is agglutinative.

Waṇetsi	General Pashto	Translation
šā ya	də/lə šā nə	from the back
tsā́h ya	lə tsā́h nə	from the well
tsā ya	lə cā nə	from whom
xalxó ya	lə xalkó nə	from the people

=== Demonstratives ===
In Waṇetsi اغه [aɣa] functions for both Pashto دغه (this) and هغه (that).

	Singular		Plural
	Masc.	Fem.	Plural
Direct	áğa	áğa áğә	áğa áğe
Oblique	áğә	áğe	áğo áğu

=== Verb Infinitive ===
Where as General Pashto employs the ل [ә́l] to the past stem to make it infinitive, Waṇetsi employs نګ [ang] to the past stem to make it infinitive.

Waṇetsi	General Pashto	Translation
xwaṛang	xwaṛә́l	to eat
lambedang	lambedә́l	to bathe
wezang	waźә́l	to kill
wayang	wayә́l	to say
kṛang	kawә́l	to do
cinostang	kṣ̌enāstә́l	to sit

== Bibliography ==
- J. H. Elfenbein, (1984). "The Wanetsi Connexion: Part I". Journal of the Royal Asiatic Society of Great Britain and Ireland (1): 54–76.
- J. H. Elfenbein, (1984). "The Wanetsi Connexion: Part II". Journal of the Royal Asiatic Society of Great Britain and Ireland (2): 229–241.
- J. H Elfenbein, (1967). "Lanḍa Zor Wəla Waṇecī". Archiv Orientální. XXXV: 563–606.

== See also ==
- Pashto Dialects
- Pashto Grammar
- Wazirwola
- Ormuri language
- Pamiri languages
