= Central Pashto =

Variety of the Pashto language

- Native to: Pakistan, Afghanistan
- Ethnicity: Pashtuns
- Native speakers: 6.4 million (2017 census)
- Language family: Indo-European: Indo-Iranian; Iranian; Eastern; Pashto; Central Pashto
- Writing system: Arabic (Pashto alphabet)

Official status
- Regulated by: Pashto Academy of Pakistan; Academy of Sciences of Afghanistan

Language codes
- ISO 639-3: pst
- Glottolog: cent1973

Central Pashto (Pashto: منځنۍ پښتو, romanized: Manźanəi Pax̌to) is a standard variety of the Pashto language, spoken in parts of Pakistan and Afghanistan. They are the middle dialects of Mangal, Zadran, Mahsudi and Waziri. These dialects are affected by what Ibrahim Khan terms as "the Great Karlāṇ Vowel Shift".

Central Dialects - "موږ"
Waziri
/miʒ/

Here is a comparison of Middle Dialects with South Eastern:

Central Dialects	ښ	ږ	څ	ځ	ژ
Waziri	ʃ	ʒ	t͡s	d͡z	ʒ
Dzadrāṇi	ç	ʝ	t͡s	d͡z	ʒ
Mahsudi	ʃ	ʒ	t͡s, s	d͡z, z	ʒ

== Northern ==
=== Zadrani ===
Daniel Septfonds provides the following example:

	Sentence	Notes
Dzadrāṇi	دا يې تو په اورشو کې ميږ پروتۀ يي dā ye to pə oršó ke miʝ protə́ yi	The preposition يې; is used instead of the د /də/ [د+تا=ستا]: The first person plural يو changes to يي; The "ā" can change into "o" as in تا and پراتۀ
Kandahar	دا ستا په ورشو کې موږ پراتۀ يو dā sta pə waršó ke muẓ̌ prātə́ yu	The preposition يې; is used instead of the د /də/ [د+تا=ستا]: The first person plural يو changes to يي; The "ā" can change into "o" as in تا and پراتۀ
Meaning	On this meadow of yours, we are lying/located.	

=== Vowel Shift ===
In Źadrāṇi, a vowel shift like Waziri has been noted:

Kandahar	Meaning	Zadrani	N.Wazirwola
هوښيار /huʂ.ˈjɑr/ huṣ̌yā́r	Intelligent	ox̌yór /oç.ˈjor/	ošyór /ɔʃ.ˈjɔr/
پياله /pjɑ.ˈla/ pyālá	Cup	pyolá, pyelá /pjo.ˈla/, /pjo.ˈla/	pyolá /pjɔ.ˈla/

- Apridi

Afridi/Apridi is also categorised as a Northern Phonology.

==== Vowel Shift ====
There is presence of the additional vowels close-mid central rounded vowel /ɵ/ and open back rounded vowel /ɒː / in Apridi. The following vowel shift has been noted by Jdosef Elfenbein:

- The [a] in Pashto can become [ɑ] and also [e] in Apridi:

Northeastern General IPA	Apridi IPA	Meaning
/las/	/lɑs/	ten
/ɣag/	/ɣɑg/	sound
/ʃpag/	/ʃpeg/	six
/wraz/	/wrez/	day

- The [ɑ] in Pashto can become [ɒː] in Apridi:

Northeastern General IPA	Apridi IPA	Meaning
/ˈban.d̪e/	/ˈbɒːn.d̪e/	upon

- The [o] in Pashto can becomes [ɵ] in Apridi:

Northeastern General IPA	Apridi IPA	Meaning
/mor/	/mɵr/	mother

- The [u] in Pashto can becomes [i] in Apridi:

Northeastern General IPA	Apridi IPA	Meaning
/u.ˈd̪ə/	/wi.ˈd̪ə/	asleep

==== Lexical Comparison ====
Naseem Khan Naseem provides the following list:

Apridi	Yusapzai	Meaning
کالۀ kālə́	کور kor	house
خورxɵr	خور xor	sister
مړييېmaṛíye	ډوډۍ ḍoḍə́i	food
پلورplɒr	پلار plār	father

==== Sample Text ====
Sample Text Audio
Speaker: Sahil Apridi [poet]
[ˈpɵr.t̪a ʃo bjel ke.nɒs.ˈt̪o ]

The following difference can be noticed in pronunciation:

Literary Pashto	Apridi Pashto	Yusapzai Pashto	Meaning
پورته شو بېل کښېناستۀ	pɵ́rta šo byel kenɒstó	pórta šo byal kenāstó	he went ahead, sat separately.
pórta šo bel kx̌enāstə́	pɵ́rta šo byel kenɒstó	pórta šo byal kenāstó	he went ahead, sat separately.

=== Kurama ===
Kurama: Example
Speaker from Central Kurram Agency

The following is an example from Central Kurram agency; where a change in /ɑ/ to /ɔ/ can be seen:

Literary Pashto	Kurram Pashto	Meaning
هغه ددې نه ډېر بهتر و. خو چې اوس ړنګ شو خدای نه راغله. بس اوس موږ دې کښې ډېر خوشحاله يو	áğa da de na ḍer bextár u. xo če os ṛang šo xodai na rɔ́ ğla . bas os mug de ke ḍer xošɔ́la yu	That was much better than this. But now that it is destroyed it came from God. Now we are very happy in this; that's all.
háğa da de na ḍer behtár wə. xo če os ṛang šo xwdāi na rā́ ğla. bas os mug de kx̌e ḍer xošā́la yu.	áğa da de na ḍer bextár u. xo če os ṛang šo xodai na rɔ́ ğla . bas os mug de ke ḍer xošɔ́la yu	That was much better than this. But now that it is destroyed it came from God. Now we are very happy in this; that's all.

== Southern ==
=== Waziri ===
==== Vowel Shift ====
Comparison of Vowels
North Waziristan: ɔ
N. Waziri [Zakar Khel]: ḍer ḍeṛ taklíp ğwɔṛí

Meaning: It needs a lot of struggle (meaning, it's very difficult)

Yusapzai Pashto: ډېر ډېر تکليف غواړي [ḍer ḍeṛ taklíp ğwāṛí]

South Waziristan: ɒ
S. Waziri [Maseedwola]: byɒ če kíma du

Meaning: then that which they

Yusapzai Pasht: بيا چې کومه دوی [byā če kóma duy]

In Waziri Pashto there is also a vowel shift

In Waziri dialect the [ɑ] in most other dialects of Pashto becomes [ɔː] in Northern Waziri and [ɒː] in Southern Waziri.

	Meaning	Standard Pashto	N.Wazirwola	S. Wazirwola
ماسته	yougurt	/mɑs.t̪əˈ/	/mɔːs.ˈt̪ə/	/mɒːs.ˈt̪ə/
پاڼه	leaf	/pɑˈ.ɳa/	/ˈpɔː.ɳjɛː/	/ˈpɒː.ɳjɛː/

In Waziri dialect the stressed [o] in most other dialects of Pashto becomes [œː] and [ɛː]. The [o] in general Pashto may also become [jɛ] or [wɛː].

	Meaning	Standard Pashto	Wazirwola
لور	sickle	/lor/	/lœːr/
وړه	flour	/o.ɽəˈ/	/ɛː.ˈɽə/
اوږه	shoulder	/o.ɡaˈ/	/jɛ.ˈʒa/
اوس	now	/os/	/wɛːs/

In Waziri dialect the stressed [u] in general Pashto becomes [iː].

	Meaning	Standard Pashto	Wazirwola
موږ	we	/muɡ/	/miːʒ/
نوم	name	/num/	/niːm/

When [u] in begins a word in general Pashto can become [wiː], [jiː] or [w[ɛ]]

	Meaning	Standard Pashto	Wazirwola
اوم	raw	/um/	/jiːm/
اوږه	garlic	/ˈu.ɡa/	/ˈwiː.ʒa/
اوده	asleep	/u.ˈd̪ə/	/wɜ.ˈd̪ə/

==== Diphthongs in Waziri ====
A change is noticed:

Standard Pronunciation	Waziri
aɪ	aɪ
ˈaɪ	
ˈəɪ	ˈaɪ
oɪ	oːi œːi
uɪ	oˈjə
aw	
ɑi	
ɑw	

=== Khattak ===
==== Vowel Lengthening ====
The Khattak dialect, as deduced by Yusuf Khan Jazab in contrast to non-Karāṇi dialects differentiates lexemes in term of vowel lengthening.

Example: between /e/ and /eː/ - transcribed as "e" and "ē" respectively to indicated the distinction.

	Khattak	Standard Pashto	Meaning
	de dē xabə́re	də de xabə́re	Of this talk
IPA	/d̪e d̪eː xa.ˈbə.re/	/d̪ə d̪e xa.ˈbə.re/	Of this talk

==== Vocabulary ====
The following words which are rare in Kandhari and Yusapzai Pashto, were noted by Yousaf Khan Jazab in the Khattak dialect:

Khattak			Meaning	Variety of Khattak Dialect
	Transliteration	Grammar	Meaning	Variety of Khattak Dialect
اول	awā́l	noun	Saturday	General
باګه	bā́ga	noun	knee band	Teri
بلابس	balābás	adjective	resourceful	General
بنجوڼې	banjóṇe	noun	small pieces of the stems of the gram plants	General
زبوله	zabóle	noun	small pieces of the stems of the gram plants	General
بانګړه	bā́ngṛa	noun	dance of men in a circle; attan	General
برېزار	barezā́r	noun	brunch time	General
چوشې	čóše	noun	thick threads for fastening sacs	General
دوړنه	doṛə́na	noun	mushrooms	General
دوړنګه	doṛə́nga	noun	mushrooms	General
درنګ	drang	noun	mine, deposit of minerals	General
اېتبور	etbór	noun	Sunday	General
ګېني	gení	noun	a game played by girls	General
ګيلې	gíle	noun	a game played by girls	General
ګوبين	gobín	noun	honey	General
ګډګډی	guḍguḍáy	noun	a game played with one leg	General
سخی	sxay	noun	a game played with one leg	General
ګوډيسمسه	guḍisamsá	noun	a type of a bird	General
ګوګره	gugə́ṛa	noun	cuckoo bird	General
ګوتمۍ	gutmə́i	noun	shopping-bag	General
خولۍ رېځ	xulə́i rez	noun	Saturday	General
څلورم	salorám	noun	Monday	Teri
پينځم	pinzám	noun	Tuesday	General
وودينه	wodiná	noun	Thursday	General
مېلې رېځ	melé rez	noun	Wednesday	Teri
غولېل	ğulél	noun	slingshot	Teri
غومبکه	ğumbə́ka	noun	a dish made from grains, cooked during a rainy day(s) with grains given by different households	General
غورکی	ğurkáy	noun	hole	General
غورمۀ سترګه	ğurmə́ stə́rga	noun	sun	General
سترګه	stə́rga	noun	sun	General
ايکونه	ikóna	noun	a large pot for storing grains	General
کېړۍ	keṛə́i	noun	sandals	General
کوړيکت	koṛikə́t	noun	kabaddi game	General
کوړکۍ	koṛakə́i	noun	springle	General
کتريکی	kutrikáy	noun	springle	General
کړاغه	kṛāğá	noun	female crow	General
کاغه	kā́ğa	noun	female crow	General
کاړغۀ	kāṛğə́	noun	male crow	Teri
کونۍ	kunə́i	noun	a game in which four players take part	General
کرکمنه	kurkamə́na	noun	slingshot	General
لېبۍ	lebə́i	noun	a collective dance of women in a circle	General
لګاډه	lgā́ḍa	noun	channel	General
لوګ	lug	adjective	worthless	General
لوستل	lwastə́l	verb	to scatter	General
منګور	mangór	noun	snack	General
مسلۍ	masalə́i	noun	story	General
موی مرغۀ	móy mə́rğa	noun	peacocok	General
نخۍ	nəxə́i	noun	decorated cloth for the saddle of a cammel	General
نيالي	nyālí	noun	a mattress type of blanket	General
نولي	nolí	noun	a mattress type of blanket	General
پڼسی	paṇsáy	noun	thread	General
سبينه	sabiná	noun	morning	Teri
سبېيي	sabeyí	noun	morning	General
سلارغوشيې	salārğóšye	noun	pitchfork	General
ستر	stər	adjective	huge	General
شندل	šandə́l	verb	to spend	General
شنل	šanə́l	verb	to shake	General
شڼول	šaṇawə́l	verb	to shake	General
ششته	šuštá	adjective	clear and well organised	General
شين ټاغې	šin ṭā́ğe	noun	a blue bird	General
شينشوتتک	šinšotaták	noun	a blue bird	General
شينتوتی	šintotáy	noun	a blue bird	General
شورول	šorawə́l	verb	to keep	General
ويړول	wiṛawə́l	verb	to spread	General
وويا	wóyā	noun	egg	General
وراته	wrā́ta	noun	wife	General
خوسول	xusawə́l	verb	to move	General
خوړ	xwəṛ	noun	channel	General
يږه	yə́ža	noun	female bear	General
زېړي کوچ	zeṛi kúc	noun	a type of bird	General

=== Baniswola [Banusi] ===
Banusi Nasalisation compared to Standard Pronunciation
[[:File:Ps-Banusi-nasalisation.wav|/t̪lə̃/ /t̪ləm/]]
I was going

==== Nasalisation ====
In the Bannu dialect the nasalisation of vowels has been noted, as mentioned by Yousuf Khan Jazab:

Baniswola	Kandahar	English
Nasalised First Person Verbal Suffix: ں [~]
تلں tlə̃ or tləń	تلم tləm	I was going
Compare with Third Person Masc. Sing. Verbal Suffix ۀ [ə]
تلۀ tlə	تلۀ tlə	He was going

==== Stress ====
As with other dialects stress on a particular syllable can also change the meaning of a word or aspect of the verb.

	Baniswola					
Lexical Change	Final Stress		Meaning	Initial Stress		Meaning
Lexical Change	غووړي	ğwoṛí	oil	غووړي	ğwóṛi	he/she/they wants
Lexical Change	مستې	masté	yogurt	مستې	máste	luscious
Lexical Change	مزديره	məzdirá	maid	مزديره	mə́zdira	daily-wage
	Final Stress [Imperfective]		Meaning	Non-Final Stress [Perfective]		Meaning
Verbal Aspect Change	کښېنں	kšenə̃́	I am sitting	کښېنں	kšénə̃	I sit [now]
Verbal Aspect Change	پرېوتلں	prewatələ̃́	I was falling	پرېوتلں	préwatələ̃	I fell
