= Southern Pashto =

Variety of Pashto language

- South Western Pashto, South Eastern Pashto
- Native to: Pakistan, Afghanistan
- Ethnicity: Pashtuns
- Speakers: L1: 15 million (2017); L2: 3.5 million (2021)
- Language family: Indo-European: Indo-Iranian; Iranian; Eastern; Pashto; Southern Pashto
- Writing system: Arabic (Pashto alphabet)

Official status
- Regulated by: Academy of Sciences of Afghanistan; Pashto Academy Quetta

Language codes
- ISO 639-3: pbt
- Glottolog: sout2649

Southern Pashto (Pashto: جنوبي/سهيلي پښتو) is a standard variety of the Pashto language spoken in southeastern Afghanistan, and northern parts of the Pakistani province of Balochistan, comprising the Southwestern and Southeastern dialects of Pashto.

Southern Comparison

غوږ

Ear
South Western [Kandahar]
Pashto pronunciation: [/ɣwaʐ/]

South Eastern [Quetta]
/ɣwaʒ/

== South Western ==
Kandahārí Pashtó (Pashto: کندهارۍ پښتو), also known as Southwestern Pashto, is a Pashto dialect, spoken in southern and western Afghanistan, including the city of Kandahar.

Kandahari Pashto is spoken in Kandahar, Helmand, Ghazni, most of Urozgan, Farah, Faryab and Nimruz, southeastern Ghor, the districts of Murghab, Ghormach, Muqur, and Jawand in Badghis, and parts of Zabul, Paktika, and Herat provinces of Afghanistan. It is also spoken in parts of the provinces of Razavi Khorasan and South Khorasan in Iran, where they numbered roughly 120,000 (in 1993).

It is one of the most archaic varieties of Pashto: the Kandahari dialect retains archaic retroflex sibilants, /ʂ/ and /ʐ/ (in other dialects, they have shifted to ʃ/x and ʒ/g). Kandahari also has the affricates /t͡s/ and /d͡z/.

=== Lexical Variation ===
According to the "Pashto Dialectal Dictionary (Pashto: پښتو لهجوي قاموس)" published by the Academy of Sciences of Afghanistan the following is noted in Kandahar province:

Standard معياري myārí	Meaning مانا mānā́	Ghorak [Tribe: Popalzai]	Spin Boldak [Tribe: Achakzai]	Maruf [Tribe: Alizai]	Arghandab [Tribe: Alikozai]	Panjwayi [Tribe: Sakzai]	Kandahar [Tribe: Nurzai]
آباد/ ودان ābā́d/wadā́n	populated	ابات abā́t	ابات abā́t	ابات abā́t	ابات abā́t	ابات abā́t	ابات abā́t
اپلتې apláte	absurdity	چټيات čaṭyā́t	چټيات čaṭyā́t	اپلتې apláte	ګډې وډې gaḍé waḍé	ګډې وډې gaḍé waḍé	ګډې وډې gaḍé waḍé
اتکړۍ atkaṛə́i	handcuffs	زولنې zawlané	زولنې zawlané	زولنې zawlané	زولنې zolané	زولنې zolané	زولنې zolané
اخېړ axéṛ	plaster [clay mixed with straw]	ګل gә́l	ګل gә́l	ګل gә́l	کاګل kāgә́l	کاګل kāgә́l	کاګل kāgә́l
	mother	ادې adé	ادې adé	دادا dādā́	مور mor	مور mor	مور mor
	enmity	دښمني doṣ̌maní	تربورګلوي tarburgalwí	تربورګلوي tarburgalwí	دښمني doṣ̌maní	دښمني doṣ̌maní	دښمني doṣ̌maní
ارت art	wide	پېراخه perāxá	غټ ğaṭ	پراخ prāx	پيراخ pirā́x	پيراخ pirā́x	پيراخ pirā́x
اوبدل obdә́l	to weave	ودل wadә́l	ودل wadә́l	اودل odә́l	ودل wadál	ودل wadál	ودل wadál
اوړۀ oṛә́	flour	اوړۀ oṛә́	اوړۀ oṛә́	اوړۀ oṛә́	وړۀ waṛә́	وړۀ waṛә́	وړۀ waṛә́

== South Eastern ==
In the South Eastern dialect, /ʂ/ and /ʐ/ in South Western sometimes change to ʃ and ʒ. Whilst /t͡s/ and /d͡z/ are generally pronounced.

Dialect	ښ	ږ	څ	ځ	ژ
Kandahar	[ʂ]	[ʐ]	[t͡s]	[d͡z]	[ʒ]
Quetta	[ʃ]	[ʒ]	[t͡s]	[d͡z]	[ʒ, z]

In all 3rd-person pronouns 'h' is not articulated. And distinction in 'he' and 'she' pronouns is not noted.

Personal pronoun	Kandahar	Quetta	Meaning
زه	zə	zə	I
ته	tə, less often təi	tə, less often təi	you (singular)
هغه	hağə	ağə	he
هغه	hağe	ağə	she
موږ/مونږ	mʊẓ̌	mʊž/məž	we
تاسو/تاسې	tāse/tāsī	tāse/tāsī	you (plural)
هغوی	hağwi/hağūi	ağwi/ağūi	they

== Kākaṛi ==
Kākaṛi is classed as Southeastern dialect. The following has been noted:

Kākaṛi	Literary Pashto	Grammar	Meaning
بم bam	به مې bə me	bə: future / past habitual marker me: Weak Oblique 1st Pronoun	Example: ای د سترګو ديد بم سره کله کږي āi də stə́rgo did bam sará kə́la káži Oh when will my eyes' [do his] viewing
امۍ amə́i	ګډا gaḍā́	Direct Singular Feminine Noun	dance
راله rā́la	راغله rā́ğla	come: Aorist Past 3rd Person Feminine Singular	[She] came
سي si	چې če	that: Particle	that

== Sherani ==
According to Josef Elfenbein, Sherani Pashto can be classed either as South Western or South Eastern. Word choice can be distinct:

Dialect			Meaning	Notes
Southern	Sherani	ګانده مزدک له راسه gā́nda mazdə́k lə rāsá	Come to the mosque tomorrow	Kandahari uses the Arabic borrowings: سبا [from صباح] and مسجد . Whereas Sherani uses more pure Pashto: ګانده and مزدک
Southern	Kandahari	سبا مسجد له راسه sabā́ masjéd lə rāsá	Come to the mosque tomorrow	Kandahari uses the Arabic borrowings: سبا [from صباح] and مسجد . Whereas Sherani uses more pure Pashto: ګانده and مزدک
Northern [Yusupzai]		سبا جومات ته راشه sabā́ jumā́t tə rāšá	Come to the mosque tomorrow	In comparison to the two Southern dialects, ته is used instead of له and the form of the verb to-be: شول is used instead of سول

== Marwat-Bettani ==
In Marwat-Bettani the following is noted:

Marwat Words
مېړګی [pony]
/meɽ.ɡaˈɪ/

بغور [cheek]
/ba.ɣwəˈr/

Dialect	ښ	ږ	څ	ځ	ژ	ش
Marwat	[ʃ]	[ʒ]	[t͡ʃ]	[d͡ʒ]	[z]	[ʃ],[s]

Compare the words

Standard	Kandahar	Marwat	Marwat	Meaning
رېبځ	/re.bəˈd͡z/	رېبځ	/rebə'd͡ʒ/	broom
ږمنځ	/ʐmuŋd͡z/	ږمنځ	/ʒməŋd͡ʒ/	comb
ژامه	/ʒɑˈ.ma/	زامبه	/zɑˈm.ba/	jaw
مټينګى	/maʈinɡaˈi/	مټونګى	/ma.ʈun.ɡaˈɪ/	bastard
پروړه	/proˈ.ɽa/	پروړې	/proˈ.ɽe/	straw
دروزه	/d̪ruˈ.za/	دروزې	/d̪ruˈ.ze/	haulm

=== Comparison with Karlāṇi varieties ===
Marwatwala agrees with other Karlāṇi varieties in the phonetic change in ښ as [ʃ].

Example:

Yusupzai	Marwatwāla	Meaning
ښار	ښار	city
xār	šār	city
ښادي	ښودي	happiness
xādí	šodí	happiness

=== Rendition of ش ===
It is noted by Yousuf Khan Jazab, in Marwatwala ش can be rendered as [s].

Example:

Kandahāri	Karlāṇi	Marwatwāla	Meaning
اوربشې /or.bəˈ.ʃe/ orbә́še	اربشې	اربسې	barley
اوربشې /or.bəˈ.ʃe/ orbә́še	/ar.bəˈ.ʃe/	/ar.bəˈ.se/	barley
اوربشې /or.bəˈ.ʃe/ orbә́še	arbә́še	arbә́se	barley
سول /swəl/ swəl	شول	سلل	to become [past tense,verbaliser]
سول /swəl/ swəl	/ʃwəl/	/sləl/	to become [past tense,verbaliser]
سول /swəl/ swəl	šwәl	sləl	to become [past tense,verbaliser]
شخړه /ʃxaˈ.ɽa/ šxáṛa	سخړه		quarrel, strife
شخړه /ʃxaˈ.ɽa/ šxáṛa	/ʃxəˈ.ɽa/		quarrel, strife
شخړه /ʃxaˈ.ɽa/ šxáṛa	sxә́ṛa		quarrel, strife
