= Waziristani dialect =

Pashto dialect of northwestern Pakistan

Wazirwola
- Wazirstani, Waziri
- Native to: Pakistan, Afghanistan
- Region: Waziristan
- Language family: Indo-European: Indo-Iranian; Iranian; Eastern; Pashto; Wazirwola
- Writing system: Perso-Arabic

Language codes
- ISO 639-3: None (mis)
- Glottolog: waci1238

Waziristāní (Pashto: وزیرستانۍ), also known as Wazirwóla (Pashto: وزیرواله, meaning "of the Wazirs") and Wazirí, is a central Pashto dialect spoken in North Waziristan and South Waziristan. Waziristani differs in pronunciation and to a much lesser degree in grammar from the other varieties of Pashto.

The Waziristani dialect is similar to the dialect spoken around Urgun (eastern Paktika province) and the Bannuchi dialect of Bannu.

Lorimer states:

While the Waziri dialects, differ as a family, in a marked degree from the Peshawar and other dialects of Pashto, they also differ to a less extent amongst themselves. These variations however, do not appreciably impede communication between Waziris of different tribes...

— J.G. LORIMER, Grammar and Vocabulary of Waziri Pashto, 1902, introductory note

Waziristani Pashto is spoken by various tribes, and it is also called Masidwola by the Mahsuds and Dāwaṛwóla by the Dāwaṛ. In the Dāwaṛi variety of Wazrisitani the word for هګۍ [haɡəɪ] is يييې [jije].

The standard Pashto word for "boy", "هلک" [halək], is rarely heard in Waziristani, instead, "وېړکی" [weṛkai] meaning "little one" is used [from standard: وړوکی -waṛúkai] . The word "ləshki" [ləʃki] is used instead of the standard "لږ" [ləʐ], "a little bit".

== Notes ==
- Linguist List
