= Northern Pashto =

Variety of the Pashto language

- Native to: Pakistan, Afghanistan
- Ethnicity: Pashtun
- Speakers: L1: 23 million (2017); L2: 1.4 million (2022)
- Language family: Indo-European: Indo-Iranian; Iranian; Eastern; Pashto; Northern Pashto
- Writing system: Pashto alphabet

Official status
- Regulated by: Pashto Academy of Pakistan

Language codes
- ISO 639-3: pbu
- Glottolog: nort2646

Northern Pashto (Pashto: شمالي پښتو) is a standard variety of the Pashto language spoken in the northern and central parts of the Pakistani province of Khyber Pakhtunkhwa, and central-eastern Afghanistan, comprising the Northwestern and Northeastern dialects of Pashto.

Northern Comparison

موږ

"we"
Northern [Wardak]
/muʝ/

Northern [Western dialects & Maidani]
/munɡ/

Northern [Eastern dialects]
/muɡ/

== North Eastern ==
Northeastern Pashto is spoken primarily in the Khyber-Pakhtunkhwa province of Pakistan.

=== Yusapzai ===
Yusapzai ژ Shift
The change from /ʒ/ to /d͡ʒ/
Literary: هيبوه لا ژوندۍ ده

Pashto pronunciation: [/hi.ˈba.wa lɑ d͡ʒwan.ˈd̪əi d̪a/]

Meaning: The ibis is still alive

Yusufzai/Yusapzai Pashto is the most-spoken subdialect in the Northeastern Dialect.

Comparison:

Dialects	ښ	ږ	څ	ځ	ژ
North Eastern (e.g. Yusapzai)	[x]	[ɡ]	[s]	[z]	[d͡ʒ]
North Western (e.g Jalalabad)	[x]	[ɡ]	[s]	[z]	[ʒ]
North Western (e.g. Wardak)	[ç]	[ʝ]	[t͡s]	[d͡z]	[ʒ, z]
North Western (e.g. Maidan Shar & Kabul)	[x]	[g]	[t͡s]	[z, j]	[z]

==== Lexical Variation ====
Even within the Yusapzai dialect; regional lexical variation is noted; as pointed out by Dr. Muhammad Ali Kaleem:

Meaning	Mardan	Swat
Ring	ګتمه gʊ́tma	ګوتۍ gwə́təi or Guta
Spinach	ساګ sāg	سابه sābə́
Cup	پيالۍ pyālə́i	پياله pyālá
Puppy	کوتری kutré or Spey	کوکری kukré

===== Sub-regional lexical variation =====
Even with regions there can be minor differences in pronunciation. Example:

Malakand District [some localities]	Malakand District [general]	Standard Pashto	Meaning
فپه fpa	ښپه xpa	پښه px̌a, pxa, pša, pṣ̌a	foot

== North Western ==
ښه يمه - in Northern Dialects
North Western [Wardak]
/çə ˈjə.ma/

North Eastern and North Western [Jalalabad]
/xə ˈjə.ma/

The North Western is spoken in the east, Central, and northeast Afghanistan.

=== Phonological Variation ===
Recording of a native Wardag Dialect Speaker
موږ به دا

/muʝ bə d̪ɑ/

We will this...

There is regional difference in North Western Pashto in pronunciation of words:

	Meaning	Wardak	Jalalabad	Bati Kot	Maidan Shar/ Kabul
دوی	they	deɪ	ˈduwi	ˈduwi	ˈduwi
راکړه	give [imperative of راکول]	ˈrɑka	ˈrɑka	ˈrɑkɽa	'rawka
پوهېدل	to know [infinitive]	pijeˈdəl	pojeˈdəl	pojidəl	pigeˈdəl
شپږ	six	ʃpaʝ	ʃpag	ʃpiʒ	ʃpag
وريځ	cloud	wərˈjed͡z	wrez	wəˈred͡z	wrez
ښځه	woman	ˈçəd͡za	ˈxəza	ˈxəza	ˈxəza
اوبه	water	oˈbə	uˈbə	oˈbə	ūˈbə
