= Pashto =

Eastern Iranian language

- پښتو; Pax̌tó
- The word Pax̌tó written in the Pashto alphabet
- Pronunciation: [pəʂˈto], [pʊxˈto], [pəçˈto], [pəʃˈto]
- Native to: Afghanistan; Pakistan (Note: According to the 2023 Pakistani census, Pashto is spoken by 18.1% of the country's population as their mother tongue, being the second only after Punjabi. It is a regional language in Pakistani provinces of Khyber Pakhtunkhwa (where it is spoken by majority of the population making around 80% of the total) and Balochistan.)
- Ethnicity: Pashtuns
- Speakers: L1: 51 million (2017–2023); L2: 4.9 million (2022)
- Language family: Indo-European: Indo-Iranian; Iranian; Southeastern; Pashto
- Standard forms: Central Pashto; Northern Pashto; Southern Pashto
- Dialects: Pashto dialects
- Writing system: Pashto alphabet

Official status
- Official language in: Afghanistan
- Regulated by: Academy of Sciences of Afghanistan; Pashto Academy of Pakistan

Language codes
- ISO 639-1: ps – Pashto, Pushto
- ISO 639-2: pus – Pushto, Pashto
- ISO 639-3: pus – inclusive code – Pashto, Pushto; Individual codes: pst – Central Pashto pbu – Northern Pashto pbt – Southern Pashto
- Glottolog: pash1269 Pashto
- Linguasphere: 58-ABD-a
- Areas in Afghanistan and Pakistan where Pashto is: the predominant language spoken alongside other languages

Pashto (Note: Sometimes spelled "Pushtu" or "Pushto") (/ˈpʌʃtoʊ/,/ˈpæʃtoʊ/ PASH-toh; (Note: The only American pronunciation listed by Oxford Online Dictionaries is /ˈpæʃtoʊ/.) پښتو, Pəx̌tó, [pəʂˈto, pʊxˈto, pəʃˈto, pəçˈto]) is an Eastern Iranian language, belonging to the Indo-European language family, natively spoken in southern and eastern Afghanistan and northwestern Pakistan. It is historically and alternatively referred to as Afghani (افغانی, Afghāni).

Spoken as a native language mainly by ethnic Pashtuns, Pashto is one of the two official languages of Afghanistan (alongside Dari), and the second largest language in Pakistan, spoken mainly in Khyber Pakhtunkhwa and the northern districts of Balochistan. Likewise, it is the primary language of the Pashtun diaspora around the world and is "one of the primary markers of ethnic identity" amongst Pashtuns.

Pashto is the largest spoken eastern Iranian language in existence today. Per Ethnologue, the total number of Pashto speakers is estimated at around 55 million. The language maintains a variety of unique dialects and is divided into three regional forms: Northern Pashto, Central Pashto, and Southern Pashto.

The Pashto language has had centuries of written literature and is rich in cultural and oral heritage. It has produced a number of sayings, proverbs, and poems that have evolved into tales, melodies, and music, contributing and accenting substantially to the core of Pashtun history and identity.

Pashto became the 4th language to be spoken in outer space. This occurred when Afghan astronaut Abdul Ahad Momand dialed and spoke with his mother on the phone during mission time.

== Geographic distribution ==
A national language of Afghanistan, Pashto is primarily spoken in the east, south, and southwest, but also in some northern and western parts of the country. The exact number of speakers is unavailable, but different estimates show that Pashto is the mother tongue of 50–60% of the total population of Afghanistan.

In Pakistan, Pashto is spoken by 18.1% of its population, mainly in the northwestern province of Khyber Pakhtunkhwa and northern districts of Balochistan province. Pashto speakers are also found in the Punjab province, Islamabad and in the other major cities of Pakistan, most notably Karachi and Sindh, which may have the largest Pashtun population in the world.

Other communities of Pashto speakers are found in India, Tajikistan, and northeastern Iran (primarily in South Khorasan Province to the east of Qaen, near the Afghan border). In India, most ethnic Pashtun (Pathan) peoples speak the geographically native Hindi-Urdu language rather than Pashto, but there are a small numbers of Pashto speakers, such as the Sheen Khalai in Rajasthan, and the Pathan community in the city of Kolkata, often nicknamed the Kabuliwala ("people of Kabul"). Pashtun diaspora communities in other countries around the world speak Pashto, especially the sizable communities in the United Arab Emirates, Saudi Arabia, Europe, and the United States.

=== Afghanistan ===
Pashto is one of the two official languages of Afghanistan, along with Dari Persian. Since the early 18th century, the monarchs of Afghanistan have been ethnic Pashtuns (except for Habibullāh Kalakāni in 1929). Persian, the literary language of the royal court, was more widely used in government institutions, while the Pashtun tribes spoke Pashto as their native tongue. King Amanullah Khan began promoting Pashto during his reign (1926–1929) as a marker of ethnic identity and as a symbol of "official nationalism" after the Third Anglo-Afghan War in 1919, which restored Afghan control over their foreign policy. In the 1930s, a movement began to take hold to promote Pashto as a language of government, administration, and art with the establishment of a Pashto Society (Pashto Anjuman) in 1931 and the inauguration of the Kabul University in 1932 as well as the formation of the Pashto Academy (Pashto Tolana) in 1937. Muhammad Na'im Khan, the minister of education between 1938 and 1946, inaugurated the formal policy of promoting Pashto as Afghanistan's national language, leading to the commission and publication of Pashto textbooks. The Pashto Tolana was later incorporated into the Academy of Sciences of Afghanistan in line with Soviet model following the Saur Revolution in 1978.

Although officially supporting the use of Pashto, the Afghan elite regarded Persian as a "sophisticated language and a symbol of cultured upbringing". King Zahir Shah (reigning 1933–1973) thus followed suit after his father Nadir Khan had decreed in 1933 that officials were to study and utilize both Persian and Pashto. In a 1936 royal decree, Zahir Shah formally granted Pashto the status of an official language, with full rights to use in all aspects of government and education, even though the ethnically Pashtun royal family and bureaucrats mostly spoke Persian. Thus Pashto became a national language and a symbol for Pashtun nationalism.

The constitutional assembly reaffirmed the status of Pashto as an official language in 1964 when Afghan Persian was officially renamed to Dari. Since the return of the Taliban regime in 2021, although they have reaffirmed both Pashto and Dari as the official languages, critics accuse the Taliban of marginalizing Dari in favor of Pashto. The lyrics of the national anthem of Afghanistan under the Taliban are also in Pashto.

=== Pakistan ===
In British India, the 1920s saw the blossoming of Pashto language in the then NWFP: Bacha Khan in 1921 established the Anjuman-e Islah al-Afaghina (Society for the Reformation of Afghans) to promote Pashto as an extension of Pashtun culture; around 80,000 people attended the Society's annual meeting in 1927. In 1955, Pashtun intellectuals including Abdul Qadir formed the Pashto Academy Peshawar on the model of Pashto Tolana formed in Afghanistan. In 1974, the Department of Pashto was established in the University of Balochistan for the promotion of Pashto.

In Pakistan, Pashto is the first language of around 18.1% of its population (per the 2023 census). However, Urdu and English are the two official languages of Pakistan. Pashto has no official status at the federal level. Pashto is the regional language of Khyber Pakhtunkhwa and north Balochistan. Yet, the primary medium of education in government schools in Pakistan is Urdu. The lack of importance given to Pashto and its neglect has caused growing resentment amongst Pashtuns. It is noted that Pashto is taught poorly in schools in Pakistan. Moreover, in government schools material is not provided for in the Pashto dialect of that locality, Pashto being a dialectically rich language. Further, researchers have observed that Pashtun students are unable to fully comprehend educational material in Urdu.

Professor Tariq Rahman states:

"The government of Pakistan, faced with irredentist claims from Afghanistan on its territory, also discouraged the Pashto Movement and eventually allowed its use in peripheral domains only after the Pakhtun elite had been co-opted by the ruling elite...Thus, even though there is still an active desire among some Pakhtun activists to use Pashto in the domains of power, it is more of a symbol of Pakhtun identity than one of nationalism."

— Tariq Rahman, The Pashto language and identity-formation in Pakistan

Robert Nicols states:

"In the end, national language policy, especially in the field of education in the NWFP, had constructed a type of three tiered language hierarchy. Pashto lagged far behind Urdu and English in prestige or development in almost every domain of political or economic power..."

— Language Policy and Language Conflict in Afghanistan and Its Neighbors, Pashto Language Policy and Practice in the North West Frontier Province

Although Pashto is used as a medium of instruction in schools for Pashtun students, which results in better understanding and comprehension for students when compared to using Urdu, the government of Pakistan has introduced Pashto only at the primary levels in state-run schools. Taimur Khan remarks: "the dominant Urdu language squeezes and denies any space for Pashto language in the official and formal capacity. In this contact zone, Pashto language exists but in a subordinate and unofficial capacity".

== History ==
Some linguists have argued that Pashto is descended from Avestan or a variety very similar to it, while others have attempted to place it closer to Bactrian. However, neither position is universally agreed upon. What scholars do agree on is the fact that Pashto is an Eastern Iranian language sharing characteristics with Eastern Middle Iranian languages such as Bactrian, Khwarezmian and Sogdian.

Comparison with other Eastern Iranian Languages and Old Avestan:

| | "I am seeing you" |
| Pashto | زۀ تا وينم Zə tā winə́m |
| Old Avestan | Azə̄m θβā vaēnamī |
| Ossetian | ӕз дӕ уынын /ɐz dɐ wənən/ |
| Ormuri | از بو تو ځُنِم; Az bū tū dzunim |
| Yidgha | Zo vtō vīnəm əstə (tə) |
| Munji | Zə ftō wīnəm |
| Shughni | Uz tu winum |
| Wakhi | Wuz tau winəm |

Strabo, who lived between 64 BCE and 24 CE, explains that the tribes inhabiting the lands west of the Indus River were part of Ariana. This was around the time when the area inhabited by the Pashtuns was governed by the Greco-Bactrian Kingdom. From the 3rd century CE onward, they are mostly referred to by the name Afghan (Abgan).

Abdul Hai Habibi believed that the earliest modern Pashto work dates back to Amir Kror Suri of the early Ghurid period in the 8th century, and they used the writings found in Pata Khazana. Pə́ṭa Xazāná (پټه خزانه) is a Pashto manuscript claimed to be written by Mohammad Hotak under the patronage of the Pashtun emperor Hussain Hotak in Kandahar; containing an anthology of Pashto poets. However, its authenticity is disputed by scholars such as David Neil MacKenzie and Lucia Serena Loi. Nile Green comments in this regard:

"In 1944, Habibi claimed to have discovered an eighteenth-century manuscript anthology containing much older biographies and verses of Pashto poets that stretched back as far as the eighth century. It was an extraordinary claim, implying as it did that the history of Pashto literature reached back further in time than Persian, thus supplanting the hold of Persian over the medieval Afghan past. Although it was later convincingly discredited through formal linguistic analysis, Habibi's publication of the text under the title Pata Khazana ('Hidden Treasure') would (in Afghanistan at least) establish his reputation as a promoter of the wealth and antiquity of Afghanistan's Pashto culture."

— Afghan History Through Afghan Eyes

From the 16th century, Pashto poetry became popular among the Pashtuns. Some notable poets and authors who wrote in Pashto include Pir Roshan (inventor of the Pashto alphabet), Khushal Khan Khattak, Rahman Baba, Nazo Tokhi, and Ahmad Shah Durrani, founder of the Durrani Empire, precursor of the modern state of Afghanistan. The Pashtun literary tradition grew in the backdrop to weakening Pashtun power following Mughal rule: Khushal Khan Khattak used Pashto poetry to rally for Pashtun unity and Pir Bayazid as an expedient means to spread his message to the Pashtun masses.

For instance Khushal Khattak laments in :

"The Afghans (Pashtuns) are far superior to the Mughals at the sword,

Were but the Afghans, in intellect, a little discreet. If the different tribes would but support each other,

Kings would have to bow down in prostration before them"

— Khushal Khan Khattak, Selections from the Poetry of the Afghans

== Grammar ==
Pashto is a subject–object–verb (SOV) language with split ergativity. In Pashto, this means that the verb agrees with the subject in transitive and intransitive sentences in non-past, non-completed clauses, but when a completed action is reported in any of the past tenses, the verb agrees with the subject if it is intransitive, but with the object if it is transitive. Verbs are inflected for present, simple past, past progressive, present perfect, and past perfect tenses. There is also an inflection for the subjunctive mood.

Nouns and adjectives are inflected for two genders (masculine and feminine), two numbers (singular and plural), and four cases (direct, oblique, ablative, and vocative). The possessor precedes the possessed in the genitive construction, and adjectives come before the nouns they modify.

Unlike most other Indo-Iranian languages, Pashto uses all three types of adpositions—prepositions, postpositions, and circumpositions.

== Phonology ==
=== Vowels ===
| | Front | Central | Back |
|---|---|---|---|
| Close | i | | u |
| Mid | e | ə | o |
| Open | a | | ɑ |

=== Consonants ===
Consonant phonemes of Pashto
| | Labial | | Dental/ alveolar | | Post- alveolar | | Retroflex | | Palatal | Velar | | Uvular | Glottal |
|---|---|---|---|---|---|---|---|---|---|---|---|---|---|
| Nasal | | m | | n | | | | ɳ | | | ŋ | | |
| Plosive | p | b | t | d | | | ʈ | ɖ | | k | ɡ | (q) | |
| Affricate | | | t͡s | d͡z | t͡ʃ | d͡ʒ | | | | | | | |
| Fricative | (f) | | s | z | ʃ | ʒ | ʂ | | ʐ | x | ɣ | | h |
| Approximant | | | | l | | | ɽ* | | j | | w | | |
| Rhotic | | | | r | | | ɽ* | | | | | | |

*The retroflex rhotic or lateral, tends to be a lateral flap [𝼈] at the beginning of a syllable or other prosodic unit, and a regular flap [ɽ] or approximant [ɻ] elsewhere.

== Vocabulary ==
In Pashto, most of the native elements of the lexicon are related to other Eastern Iranian languages. As noted by Josef Elfenbein, "Loanwords have been traced in Pashto as far back as the third century B.C., and include words from Greek and probably Old Persian". For instance, Georg Morgenstierne notes the Pashto word مېچن mečə́n i.e. a hand-mill as being derived from the Ancient Greek word μηχανή (mēkhanḗ, i.e. a device). Post-7th century borrowings came primarily from Persian and Hindi-Urdu, with Arabic words being borrowed through Persian, but sometimes directly. Modern speech borrows words from English, French, and German.

However, a remarkably large number of words are unique to Pashto.

Here is an exemplary list of Pure Pashto and borrowings:

| Pashto | Persian Loan | Arabic Loan | Meaning |
|---|---|---|---|
| چوپړ čopáṛ | خدمت khidmat | خدمة khidmah | service |
| هڅه hátsa | کوشش kušeš | | effort/try |
| ملګری, ملګرې malgə́ray, malgə́re | دوست dost | | friend |
| نړۍ naṛә́i | جهان jahān | دنيا dunyā | world |
| تود/توده tod/táwda | گرم garm | | hot |
| اړتيا aṛtyā́ | | ضرورة ḍarurah | need |
| هيله híla | اميد umid | | hope |
| د ... په اړه də...pə aṛá | باره bāra | | about |
| بوللـه bolә́la | | قصيدة qasidah | an ode |

Due to the incursion of Persian and Arabic in modern speech, linguistic purism of Pashto is advocated to prevent its own vocabulary from dying out.

=== Classical vocabulary ===
There is a lot of old vocabulary that has been replaced by borrowings e.g. پلاز plâz 'throne' with تخت takht, from Persian. Or the word يګانګي yagānagí meaning 'uniqueness' used by Pir Roshan Bayazid. Such classical vocabulary is being reintroduced to modern Pashto. Some words also survive in dialects like ناوې پلاز 'the bride-room'.

Example from Khayr al-Bayān:

... بې يګانګئ بې قرارئ وي او په بدخوئ کښې وي په ګناهان
Transliteration: ... be-yagānagə́i, be-kararə́i wi aw pə badxwə́i kx̌e wi pə gunāhā́n
Translation: "... without singularity/uniqueness, without calmness and by bad-attitude are on sin ."

== Writing system ==
Pashto employs the Pashto alphabet, a modified form of the Perso-Arabic alphabet or Arabic script. In the 16th century, Bayazid Pir Roshan introduced 13 new letters to the Pashto alphabet. The alphabet was further modified over the years.

The Pashto alphabet consists of 45 to 46 letters and 4 diacritic marks. Latin Pashto is also used. In Latin transliteration, stress is represented by the following markers over vowels: ә́, á, ā́, ú, ó, í and é. The following table (read from left to right) gives the letters' isolated forms, along with possible Latin equivalents and typical IPA values:

| ا ā /ɑ, a/ | ب b /b/ | پ p /p/ | ت t /t/ | ټ ṭ /ʈ/ | ث (s) /s/ | ج ǧ /d͡ʒ/ | ځ g, dz /d͡z/ | چ č /t͡ʃ/ | څ c, ts /t͡s/ | ح (h) /h/ | خ x /x/ |
| د d /d/ | ډ ḍ /ɖ/ | ﺫ (z) /z/ | ﺭ r /r/ | ړ ṛ /ɺ, ɻ, ɽ/ | ﺯ z /z/ | ژ ž /ʒ/ | ږ ǵ (or ẓ̌) /ʐ, ʝ, ɡ, ʒ/ | س s /s/ | ش š /ʃ/ | ښ x̌ (or ṣ̌) /ʂ, ç, x, ʃ/ | |
| ص (s) /s/ | ض (z) /z/ | ط (t) /t/ | ظ (z) /z/ | ع (ā) /ɑ/ | غ ğ /ɣ/ | ف f /f/ | ق q /q/ | ک k /k/ | ګ ģ /ɡ/ | ل l /l/ | |
| م m /m/ | ن n /n/ | ڼ ṇ /ɳ/ | ں ̃ , ń /◌̃/ | و w, u, o /w, u, o/ | ه h, a /h, a/ | ۀ ə /ə/ | ي y, i /j, i/ | ې e /e/ | ی ay, y /ai, j/ | ۍ əi /əi/ | ئ əi, y /əi, j/ |

== Dialects ==
Pashto dialects are divided into two categories, the "soft" southern grouping of Paṣ̌tō, and the "hard" northern grouping of Pax̌tō (Pakhtu). Each group is further divided into a number of dialects. The Southern dialect of Tareeno is the most distinctive Pashto dialect.

اوږد 'long' – in different dialects
South Western (Kandahar)
IPA: /uʐd/

North Western (Jalalabad)
IPA: /uɡd/

Northern (Khost)
IPA: /wuɡd/

Southern (Kunduz)
IPA: /wuʐd/

North Eastern (Yusapzai)
IPA: /u.ɡəˈd/

1. Southern variety

- Abdaili or Kandahar dialect (or South Western dialect)
- Kakar dialect (or South Eastern dialect)
- Shirani dialect
- Mandokhel dialect
- Marwat-Bettani dialect
- Southern Karlani group

- Khattak dialect
- Wazirwola dialect

- Dawarwola dialect
- Masidwola dialect

- Banisi (Banu) dialect

2. Northern variety

- Central Ghilji dialect (or North Western dialect)
- Yusapzai and Momand dialect (or North Eastern dialect)
- Northern Karlani group

- Wardak dialect
- Tanai dialect
- Zazi dialect
- Mangal dialect
- Khosti dialect
- Zadran dialect
- Bangash-Orakzai-Turi dialect
- Afridi dialect
- Khogyani dialect

== Literary Pashto ==
Literary Pashto is the artificial variety of Pashto that is used at times as literary register of Pashto. It is said to be based on the North Western dialect, spoken in the central Ghilji region. Literary Pashto's vocabulary, also derives from other dialects.

=== Criticism ===
There is no actual Pashto that can be identified as "Standard" Pashto, as Colye remarks:

"Standard Pashto is actually fairly complex with multiple varieties or forms. Native speakers or researchers often refer to Standard Pashto without specifying which variety of Standard Pashto they mean...people sometimes refer to Standard Pashto when they mean the most respected or favorite Pashto variety among a majority of Pashtun speakers."

— Placing Wardak among Pashto Varieties, page 4

According to David MacKenzie, there is no real need to develop a "Standard" Pashto:

"The morphological differences between the most extreme north-eastern and south-western dialects are comparatively few and unimportant. The criteria of dialect differentiation in Pashto are primarily phonological. With the use of an alphabet which disguises these phonological differences the language has, therefore, been a literary vehicle, widely understood, for at least four centuries. This literary language has long been referred to in the West as 'common' or 'standard' Pashto without, seemingly, any real attempt to define it."

— A Standard Pashto, page 231

== Literature ==
Pashto speakers have long had a tradition of oral literature, including proverbs, stories, and poems. Written Pashto literature saw a rise in development in the 17th century, mostly due to poets like Khushal Khan Khattak (1613–1689), who, along with Rahman Baba (1650–1715), is widely regarded as among the greatest Pashto poets. From the time of Ahmad Shah Durrani (1722–1772), Pashto has been the language of the court. The first Pashto teaching text was written during the period of Ahmad Shah Durrani by Pir Mohammad Kakar with the title of Maʿrifat al-Afghānī ("The Knowledge of Afghani [Pashto]"). After that, the first grammar book of Pashto verbs was written in 1805 under the title of Riyāż al-Maḥabbah ("Training in Affection") through the patronage of Nawab Mahabat Khan, son of Hafiz Rahmat Khan, chief of the Barech. Nawabullah Yar Khan, another son of Hafiz Rahmat Khan, in 1808 wrote a book of Pashto words entitled ʿAjāyib al-Lughāt ("Wonders of Languages").

=== Poetry example ===
An excerpt from the Kalām of Rahman Baba:

زۀ رحمٰن پۀ خپله ګرم يم چې مين يم
چې دا نور ټوپن مې بولي ګرم په څۀ

Pronunciation: [zə raˈmɑn pə ˈxpəl.a ɡram jəm t͡ʃe maˈjan jəm
t͡ʃe dɑ nor ʈoˈpən me boˈli ɡram pə t͡sə]

Transliteration: Zə Rahmā́n pə xpə́la gram yəm če mayán yəm
Če dā nor ṭopə́n me bolí gram pə tsə

Translation: "I Rahman, myself am guilty that I am a lover,
On what does this other universe call me guilty."

=== Proverbs ===
Pashto also has a rich heritage of proverbs (Pashto matalúna, sg. matál). An example of a proverb:

اوبه په ډانګ نه بېلېږي

Transliteration: Obә́ pə ḍāng nə beléẓ̌i

Translation: "One cannot divide water by [hitting it with] a pole."

== Phrases ==
=== Greeting phrases ===
| Greeting | Pashto | Transliteration | Literal meaning |
|---|---|---|---|
| Hello | ستړی مه شې ستړې مه شې | stә́ṛay mә́ še stә́ṛe mә́ še | May you not be tired |
| Hello | ستړي مه شئ | stә́ṛi mә́ šəi | May you not be tired [said to people] |
| Hello | په خير راغلې | pə xair rā́ğle | With goodness (you) came |
| Thank you | مننه | manә́na | Acceptance [from the verb منل] |
| Goodbye | په مخه دې ښه | pə mә́kha de x̌á | On your front be good |
| Goodbye | خدای پامان | xwdā́i pāmā́n | From: خدای په امان [With/On God's security] |

=== Colors ===
==== List of colors ====
سور/ سره sur/sra [red]

زرغون/زرغونه [green] zarghoon/zarghuna

کینخي kinaxí [purple]

تور/ توره tor/tóra [black]

شین/شنا šin / šna [blue]

سپین spin/spína [white]

نسواري naswārí [brown]

ژېړ/ ژېړه žeṛ/žéṛa [yellow]

چوڼيا čuṇyā́ [violet]

خړ / خړه xәṛ/xə́ṛa [grey]

==== List of colors borrowed from neighbouring languages ====
- نارنجي nārәnjí – orange [from Persian]
- ګلابي gulābí – pink [from Hindustani, originally Persian]
- نيلي nilí – indigo [from Persian, ultimately Sanskrit]]

=== Times of the day ===
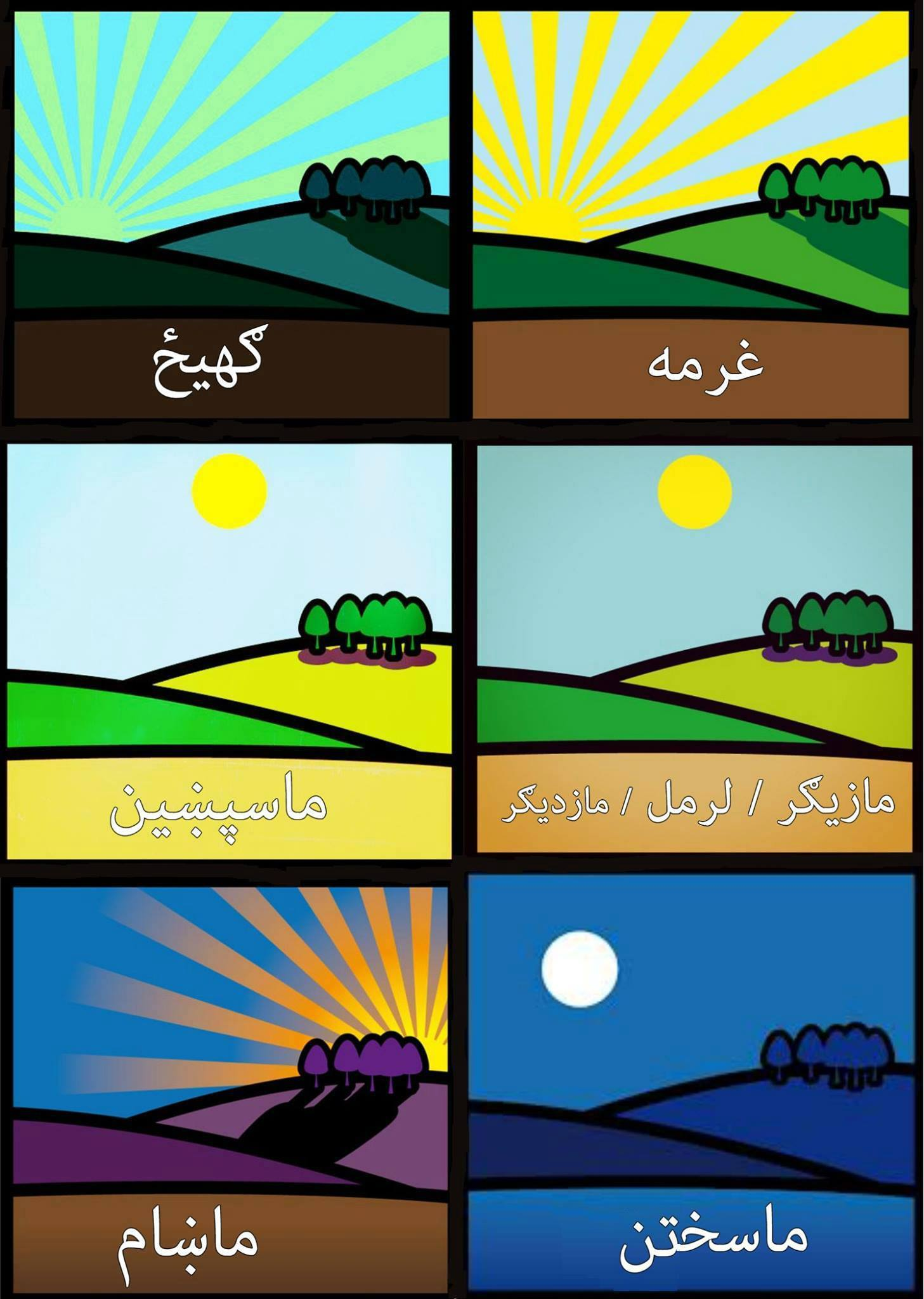
Parts of the day in Pashto

| Time | Pashto | Transliteration | IPA |
|---|---|---|---|
| Morning | ګهيځ | gahíź | /ɡaˈhid͡z/ |
| Noon | غرمه | ğarmá | /ɣarˈma/ |
| Afternoon | ماسپښين | māspasx̌ín | Kandahar: /mɑs.paˈʂin/ Yusapzai: /mɑs.paˈxin/ Bannuchi: /məʃ.poˈʃin/ Marwat: /mɑʃˈpin/ |
| Later afternoon | مازديګر مازيګر | māzdigár māzigár | /mɑz.di.ˈɡar/ /mɑ.zi.ˈɡar/ |
| Evening | ماښام | māx̌ā́m | Kandahari: /mɑˈʂɑm/ Wardak: /mɑˈçɑm/ Yusapzai: /mɑˈxɑm/ Wazirwola: /lmɑˈʃɔm/ Marwat: /mɑˈʃɑm/ |
| Late evening | ماسختن | māsxután | /mɑs.xwəˈtan/ /mɑs.xʊˈtan/ |

=== Months ===
Pashtuns use the Vikrami calendar in Pakistan, and the Solar Hijri calendar in Afghanistan. Below are the terms designated for the Vikrami months:

| # | Vikrami month | Pashto | Pashto [Karlāṇí dialects] | Gregorian months |
|---|---|---|---|---|
| 1 | Chaitra | چېتر četә́r | چېتر četә́r | March–April |
| 2 | Vaisākha | ساک sāk | وسيوک wasyók | April–May |
| 3 | Jyeshta | جېټ jeṭ | ژېټ žeṭ | May–June |
| 4 | Āshāda | هاړ hāṛ | اووړ awóṛ | June–July |
| 5 | Shraavana | ساوڼ یا پشکال sāwә́ṇ | واسه wā́sa | July–August |
| 6 | Bhādra | بدرو badrú | بادري bā́dri | August–September |
| 7 | Ashwina | آسو āsú | اسي ássi | September–October |
| 8 | Kartika | کاتۍ / کاتک kātә́i / kāták | کاتيې kā́tye | October–November |
| 9 | Mārgasirsa (Agrahayana) | منګر mangә́r | مانګر mā́ngər | November–December |
| 10 | Pausha | چيله čilá | پو po | December–January |
| 11 | Māgha | بله چيله bә́la čilá | کونزله kunzә́la | January–February |
| 12 | Phālguna | پاګڼ pāgáṇ | اربشه arbә́ša | February–March |

== Bibliography ==
- Hallberg, Daniel G. (1992). Pashto, Waneci, Ormuri. Sociolinguistic Survey of Northern Pakistan. Vol. 4. National Institute of Pakistani Studies. ISBN 969-8023-14-3. OCLC 1034637486.
- Morgenstierne, Georg (2007) [1926, pub. by Aschehoug, Oslo]. Report on a Linguistic Mission to Afghanistan. Instituttet for Sammenlignende Kulturforskning Serie C I-2. New York: Ishi Press International. ISBN 978-0-923891-09-1.
- Penzl, Herbert (2009) [1955, pub. by American Council of Learned Societies, Washington, DC]. A Grammar of Pashto: A Descriptive Study of the Dialect of Kandahar, Afghanistan. New York: Ishi Press. ISBN 978-0-923891-72-5.
- Penzl, Herbert (2009) [1962, pub. by University of Michigan Press, Ann Arbor, MI]. A Reader of Pashto. New York: Ishi Press. ISBN 978-0-923891-71-8.
- Schmidt, Rüdiger, ed. (1989). Compendium Linguarum Iranicarum. Wiesbaden: L. Reichert. ISBN 3-88226-413-6.
- Tegey, Habibullah; Robson, Barbara (1996). A Reference Grammar of Pashto (PDF). Washington, D.C.: Center for Applied Linguistics.
