= Ahmad ibn Muhammad =

Ahmad ibn Muhammad is an Arabic-origin name meaning Ahmad, son of Muhammad. It refers to the following people:

- Ahmad ibn Muhammad, famously known as Al-Musta'in was the Abbasid Caliph from 862 to 866.
- Abu Ibrahim Ahmad ibn Muhammad, Abbasid vassal Emir of Ifriqiya (856–863)
- Abu al-Abbas Ahmad ibn Muhammad ibn Kathir al-Farghani, (died 860s) also known as Alfraganus in the West, was an astronomer in the Abbasid court in Baghdad, and one of the most famous astronomers in the 9th century.
- Abu Ja'far Ahmad ibn Muhammad, Saffarid emir (923–963)
- Ahmad ibn Muhammad al-Thalabi, (died 1035/1036) was an eleventh-century Islamic scholar
- Ahmad ibn Muhammad Sajawandi, (died 1176 CE or 571 AH) was a 12th-century chronicler, commentator on the Quran, poet and orator. He was the son of the Islamic scholar Muhammad ibn Tayfour Sajawandi.
- Abu al-Abbas Ahmad ibn Muhammad Sultan of Morocco reigned from 1526 – 1545, 1547 – 1549.
- Ahmed ibn Mohammed al-Maqqari, (b. 1577–d. 1632) was a Muslim scholar, biographer and historian who is best known for his Nafḥ al-ṭīb a compendium of the history of Al-Andalus.
- Ahmed ibn Muhammad ibn Khalifa, (died 18 July 1795) also known as Ahmed al-Fateh was the progenitor of the ruling Al Khalifa dynasty of Bahrain and the first monarch of Bahrain (1783–1795).
- Ahmed Bey, Bey of Constantine (1826–1848)
