= Sajawand =

Sajawand سجاوند
- village
- Location within Afghanistan
- Coordinates: 33°54′12″N 068°48′12″E
- Country: Afghanistan
- Province: Logar Province
- Rural District: Baraki Barak District
- Time zone: UTC+4:30 (IRST)
  - Summer (DST): UTC+5:30 (IRDT)

Sajāwand (Dari/Pashto: سجاوند) is a village in Baraki Barak district, Logar province, Afghanistan.

== Name ==
Sajāwand was known in the early Islamic era as Sakāwand or Sagāwand (Persian: سکاوند\سگاوند), also Shakāwand (شکاوند) in the writings of Al-Biruni, Arabized into Sajāwand from the 10th-century onwards. This name may stem from the Pali word सक्क (Sakka) used as an epithet for the god Indra, the Vedic King of the Gods (being synonymous with the locally venerated god Zhūn) and the possessive suffix -vant. This understanding is supported by the notes of the Chinese traveler monk Xuanzang, who in the 7th-century CE described the site as the Śunāsīra mountain, Śunāsīra being another epithet for Indra. In medieval sources the town has also been known under the name Bahāwand (Persian: بهاوند) meaning "place of (great) value".

== History ==
=== The Pre-Islamic era ===
The first known mention of the site which is today known as Sajāwand is in the notes of the Chinese traveler monk Xuanzang. In the year 644 CE, during his stay in the country of Jāguda (known in Persian as Zābulistān), he writes about the religious practices of the country as being Mahayana Buddhist and pagan with the majority of worshippers venerating the god Śunā (Pashto: ږون/ږو). He describes the home of this deity as being the Śunāsīra mountain, where people came "from far and near and high and low", even attracting kings, ministers, officials and common people of regions where different customs were observed, to pay homage and make donations.

"They either offer gold, silver, and rare gems or present sheep, horses, and other domestic animals to the god in competition with each other to show their piety and sincerity. Therefore gold and silver are scattered all over the ground, and sheep and horses fill up the valley. Nobody dares to covet them, for everyone is eager to make offerings to the god. To those who respect and serve the heretics and practice asceticism whole-heartedly, the god imparts magical incantations, of which the heretics make effective use in most cases; for the treatment of disease, they are quite efficacious."

- Xuanzang, 644 CE

=== Saffarid era ===
In the 9th-century CE Sajawand would come to play a central role in the regional politics of the southern Hindu Kush. As the Saffarid brothers Ya'qūb and 'Amr ibn al-Layth set out from Zaranj on their very successful plundering and conquering of the mostly Hindu and Buddhist regions east of Nimruz, local royal families were decimated to such a degree that holy places such as Zamindawar and Sakawand became exposed to Muslim onslaught. With the defeat of its last surrounding patrons in 870 CE, the Saffarid commander Fardghān was appointed as governor of Zabulistan under the command of four thousand horsemen. Hearing of the wealth of the temple of Sakāwand, he led his army against it, took the temple, smashed its idols and overthrew its Zhūn worshipping guardians. Distributing some of the plunder among his troops, Fardghān sent the rest to 'Amr ibn al-Layth asking for reinforcements against the certain reaction of the Hindu rulers of Zabulistans eastern border. Hearing of the fall of Sakawand, the Hindu Shahi Kallar of Kabul raised an army to retake the temple, though was ultimately unable to compete with the Saffarids greater numbers.

As 'Amr ibn al-Layth was defeated by the Samanids at the battle of Balkh in 901 CE, Saffarid influence over Zabulistan waned and Sakawand once again became a dependency of local Hindu-Buddhist dynasties such as the Bamiyan Sher, the Loyaks of Zabulistan, the Hindu Shahis of Kabul and the kings of Parwan.

=== Ghaznavid era ===
With the defeat of the Bamiyan Sher as well as the expulsion of Abu Bakr Loyak from Ghazni by the Samanid slave-commander Alp Tegin in 962 CE, Sajawand fell under Ghaznavid control. Greatly benefiting from the surge of loot flowing into Ghazni under the rule of Mahmud and his sons, Sajawand recovered as a bustling town, producing a number of great Islamic scholars of the 12th century, most notably Muhammad ibn Tayfour Sajawandi and Siraj ud-Din Muhammad ibn Abd ur-Rashid Sajawandi.

=== Mughal era ===
After Baburs conquest of Kabul in 1504, he briefly mentions Sajawand during his traverse through Logar in his memoirs the Baburnama. At this time, Sajawand was a town known for its shrines and holy men, having produced a number of masters of the Naqshbandi sect, the most famous of these being the brothers Khwaja Ahmad Sajawandi and Khwaja Yunus Sajawandi, whom Babur mentions. In the reign of Akbar, Sajawand was one of many centers of the very missionary-minded Naqshbandi order of Islamic mysticism. One of Sajawands then most notable members of the order, Mawlana Bekasi Sajawandi, is known to have frequented the Majlis of Mirza Muhammad Hakim, who was governor of Kabul and a staunch adherent of the sect.

== Important sites ==
=== Temple dedicated to Zhun ===
The remains of the temple of Zhun can today be found on a hill at the outskirts of Sajawand. Brief archeological work conducted by Warwick Ball in the 1970s suggests that the temple was rebuilt by the Hindu Shahi after its sacking by Fardghān in 870 CE, with architectural, ceramic and documentary evidence showing influence from the Hindu Shahi culture of the 10th century. The mud-brick structure currently sitting on top of the original pre-Islamic platform further suggests that the temple was at some point again destroyed and rebuilt in the Islamic era. The site has in modern times been known locally as the Takht-i Jamshēd (Persian: تخت جمشید, "the throne of Jamshēd"), from the mythological character Jamshēd of Ferdowsi's Shahnamah. The site is currently outside the regulation of the Afghan authorities and have been subject to looting. In the 90s during Taliban rule, two golden statues are known to have been unearthed from the site and sold on the black market, yet to have been recovered.

Various scholars have recorded the importance of Sakawand as a major centre of Hindu pilgrimage, where the deity Surya was honoured as believers from all over Hindustan gathered to worship him.

=== The Shrine of Hazrat-o Ashiqan wa Arifan ===
In Sajawand lies also the shrine (or dargah) of the Naqshbandi masters Khwaja Ahmad Sajawandi and Khwaja Yunus Sajawandi, known as the Ziārat-e Hazrat-o 'Āshiqān wa Ārifān (Persian: زیارت حضرت عاشقان و عارفان) meaning "the shrine of the master of lovers and mystics". Within the shrine lies also the grave of Siraj ud-Din Muhammad, locally known as "Sirāji Bābā". The site is a well known place of pilgrimage, attracting people from around the province.

== Notable people ==
- Muhammad ibn Tayfour Sajawandi, a 12th-century qari and Islamic scholar.
- Ahmad ibn Muhammad Sajawandi, a 12th-century Islamic scholar.
- Siraj ud-Din Muhammad ibn Abd ur-Rashid Sajawandi, a 12th-century jurist, mathematician and scholar on Islamic inheritance law.
- Khwaja Ahmad Sajawandi, a 15th-century Sufi sheikh and part of the Naqshbandi Khwājagān-movement.
- Khwaja Yunus Sajawandi, a 15th-century Sufi sheikh and part of the Naqshbandi Khwājagān-movement.
- Mawlana Bekasi Sajawandi, a 16th-century Naqshbandi Mawlana, poet and a member of the Majlis of Mirza Muhammad Hakim at Kabul.
- Abd ul-Malik Sajawandi, a 16th-century leader of the Mahdawi movement and author of the Sirāj ul-Absār.

== See also ==
- Zabulistan
- Zamindawar
