= Chak, Wardak =

Settlement in Maidan Wardak Province of Afghanistan

Chak چک
- Location in Afghanistan
- Coordinates: 34.1077°N 68.5787°E
- Country: Afghanistan
- Province: Maidan Wardak Province
- District: Chak District
- Elevation: 2,206 m (7,238 ft)

Population
  - Total: 5,065
- Time zone: UTC+04:30 (AFT)

Chak (Pashto: چک), referred to by some as Chak-e Wardak (meaning Chak of Wardak in Dari), is a town along the Chak River in Maidan Wardak Province of Afghanistan. The town serves as the administrative center of Chak District. The main attraction in the area is the Chak Dam, which is named after the town of Chak.

The town of Chak has a population of around 5,065. It is located within the heartland of the Wardak tribe of Pashtuns.

== History ==
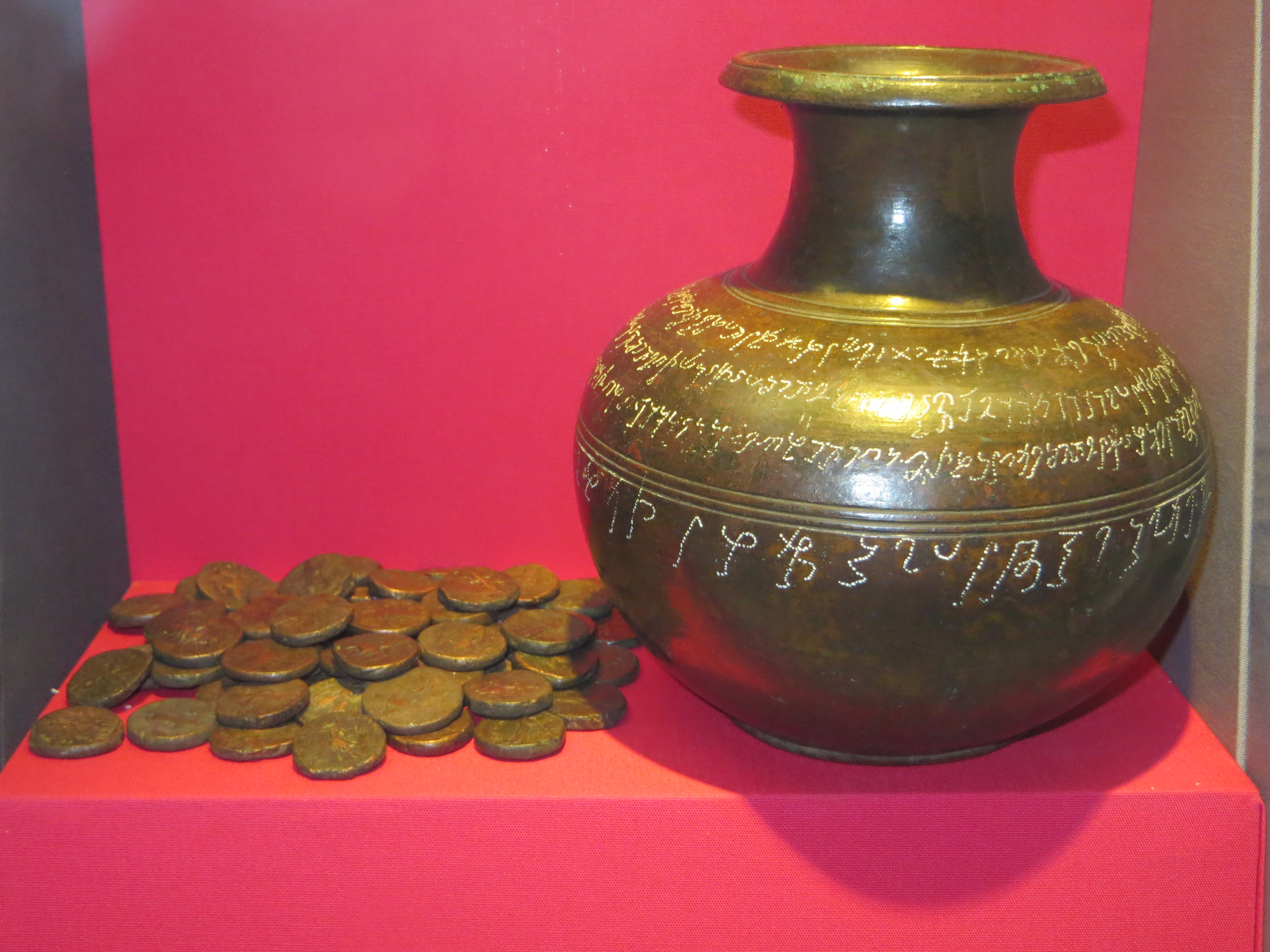
Wardak Vase and coins in the British Museum

Archaeological excavations carried out in the area of Chak indicate that the history of human settlement in this region goes back to ancient times. Outside the town, there are many ancient Buddhist remains, including a fortified monastery and six stupas, one of which contained a bronze vase with a Kharoshthi inscription that held 61 Kushan coins (pictured), which is now in the British Museum's collection.

== Geography ==
The town of Chak is approximately 2,206 m (7,238 ft) above sea level.

== Demographics ==
The population mostly belongs to the Pashtun Wardak tribe, with most residents fluent in Pashto and Dari, the official languages of Afghanistan.
