= Kharwar Dam =

Dam in Logar Province of Afghanistan

- Location within Afghanistan
- Country: Afghanistan
- Location: Kharwar District, Logar Province
- Coordinates: 33°43′50″N 68°52′24″E
- Purpose: Irrigation
- Construction began: 1930s
- Owner: Ministry of Energy and Water

Dam and spillways
- Impounds: Charkh River
- Height: 36 m (118 ft)
- Length: 140 m (460 ft)
- Elevation at crest: 2,423 m (7,949 ft)
- Width (crest): 20 m (66 ft)

The Kharwar Dam, referred to as Band-e Kharwar in Dari and Kharwar Band in Pashto, is located on the Charkh River in the Kharwar District of Logar Province in Afghanistan. It is a rock-filled gravity dam, with a height of 36 m (118 ft) and length of 140 m (460 ft). Its reservoir has the capacity to store about 17 million cubic meters of water.

The Kharwar Dam is owned and maintained by the country's Ministry of Energy and Water. It was originally built in the 1930s by the government under King Mohammad Nadir Shah and his son Mohammad Zahir Shah.

== See also ==
- List of dams and reservoirs in Afghanistan
- Valleys of Afghanistan
