= Baraki Barak District =

- District
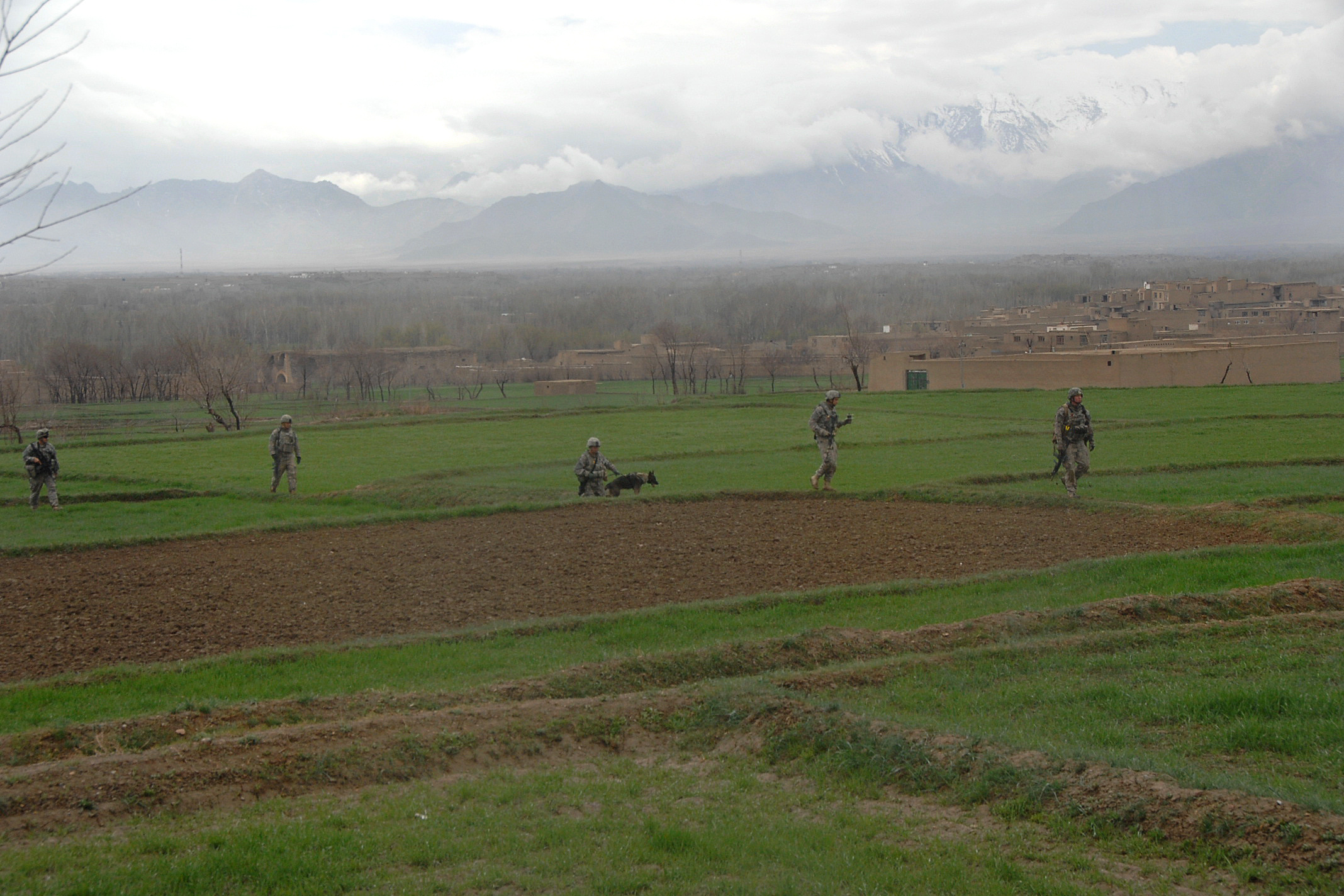
- U.S. Army soldiers help a provincial mentorship team look for weapons caches near Baraki Barak in the Logar province of Afghanistan in 2009

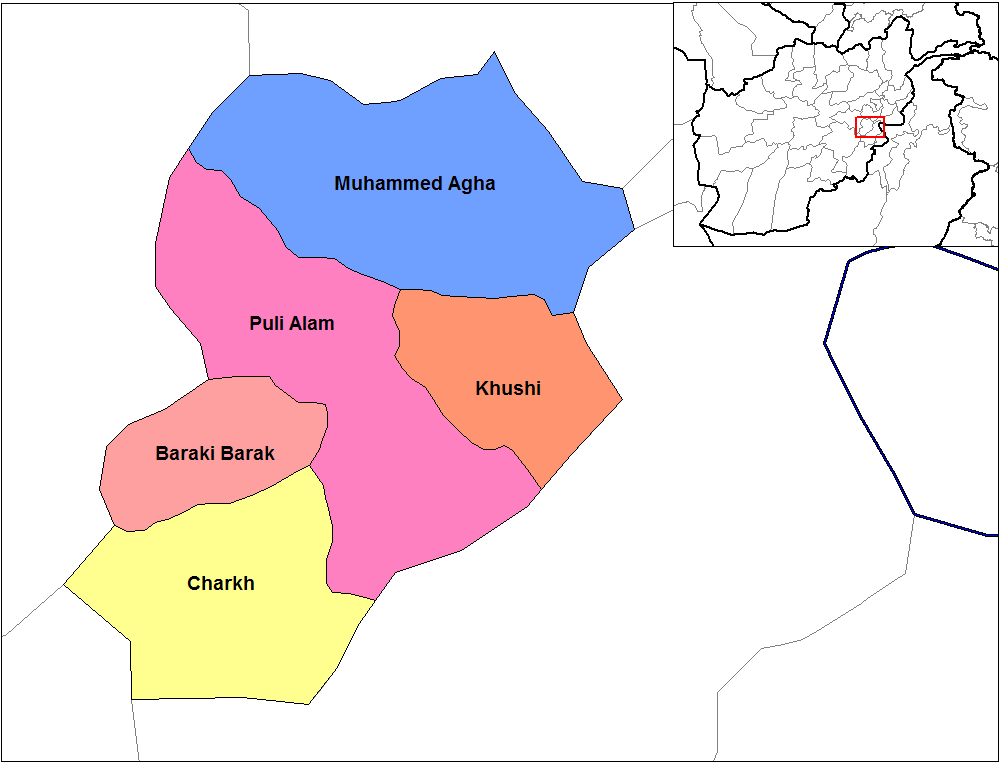
- Baraki Barak District is located in the south-west of Logar Province.
- Country: Afghanistan
- Province: Logar Province
- Time zone: UTC+4:30 (D† (Afghanistan Standard Time))

Baraki Barak District (Dari: ولسوالی برکی برک; Pashto: برکي برک ولسوالۍ) is situated in the western part of Logar Province, Afghanistan. It borders Wardak Province to the west and northwest, Puli Alam District to the north and east and Kharwar and Charkh districts to the south. The district's population is around 101,000 (2006) with a majority of over 90% Ormur Pashtuns. The district centre is the town of Baraki Barak – the former provincial capital, located in the northern part of the district in the valley of the Logar River. Baraki Rajan is another important town of this district which lies 4 km away from the district centre. The district is named after the historical Ormur tribe, also locally known as Baraki.

== Politics and security ==
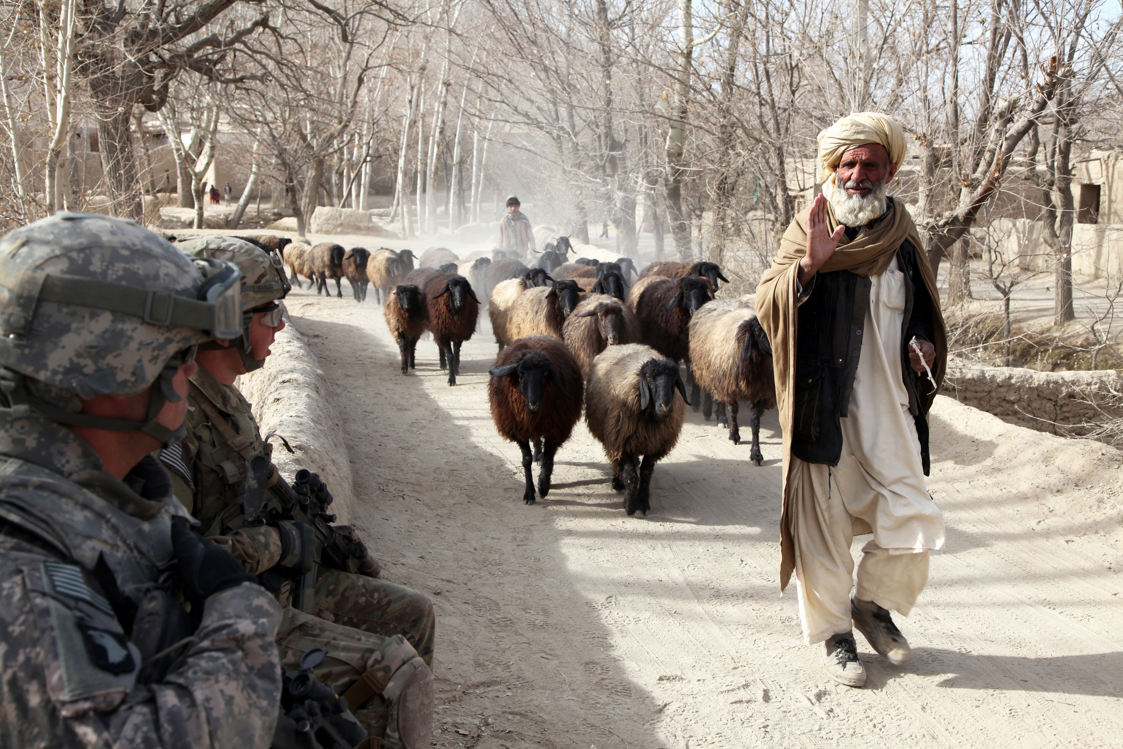
U.S. Army soldiers with the 10th Mountain Division look on as an Afghan local waves to them in the Baraki Barak District, 20 December 2010.

During the Soviet-Afghan War, the Soviet forces perpetrated the Baraki Barak massacre in September 1984.

The Baraki Barak District Sub-Governor is Mohammad Rahim "Amin". Mr. Rahim replaced Yasin Lodin in January 2010 Mr. Rahim called the first Shura for his newly elected District Community Council (DCC) in February 2010. The 45 member council consists of elected representatives from the five sub-districts of Baraki Barak, religious leaders and five female representatives. The DCC is sub-divided into three sectors: Security, Rule of Law and Development. The female representatives will serve in the Development Sector. According to the Afghanistan Social Outreach Program (ASOP), the community councils will also "strengthen security by fostering community solidarity, provide a forum for conflict resolution and provide quality assurance for sustainable development projects."

The 8 March marked the first time International Women's Day (IWD) was celebrated in Baraki Barak District. 76 burqa clad women began arriving at the District Center as early as 08:30. General Khatol Mohammadzai was the keynote speaker at the ceremony and the only female General in the Afghan National Army (ANA). General Mohammadzai is also the only woman to be airborne qualified with more than 500 free and competition parachute jumps. General Mohammadzai spoke about the equality of men and women and expressed her hope that other women might follow in her footsteps and also fight for Afghanistan's future by joining the ANA. The General is also an accomplished poet and has written poetry that proclaims the importance of women. General Mohammadzai's poems condemn discrimination and harsh treatment of women. Other speakers included Sub-Governor Rahim Amin and a female member of the Afghan Parliament – Dr. Shakila Hashimi. Upon completion of the ceremony General Khatol Mohammadzai assisted in distributing humanitarian assistance to every woman attending the ceremony.

On 27 October 2009 the Baraki Barak District Center officially opened. The district center houses offices for the district sub-governor, the local mayor and three judges who handle everything from land disputes to criminal issues.

On 22 November 2009 it was reported that several militants were detained in both the village of Kashimiri Bala and Ebrahim Kheyl in an attempt to locate a Taliban weapons facilitator actively operating in the area.

On 23 November 2009 it was reported that a government employee was abducted in the district.

According to some reports, as of 1 December 2009, insurgent activity has gone down as much as 80% since the summer of 2009 in the district capital although this could be attributed to the arrival of the winter months. The 2009 Afghan "surge" was stated to have created a security bubble for the district capital, covering about half of the district's population. However, the increase in aid and US troops to the region caused additional problems, as more civilians were targeted by the Taliban for co-operating with the government and foreign forces.

In 2008 the area experienced an influx of anti-government forces into the district. Around the beginning of 2009, no American troops were located in this district, a fact which has changed significantly as of the end of the same year as the new "Ink Spot" strategy was implemented in the area. As of 1 December 2009, at least 150 American troops from the 10th Mountain Division were located in the district, among others. Furthermore, attacks are down approximately 50% and thousands of refugees have begun to return to the area.

== See also ==
- Districts of Afghanistan
