= Cheragh Ali Cheragh =

Dr. Cheragh Ali Cheragh is a politician, born in 1950 in Kabul, and Abdullah Abdullah's running mate in the 2009 Afghanistan presidential election.

Cheragh was born in the town of Wazir Abad, in Kabul. He graduated from the Kabul Institute of Medicine and specializes in the field of surgery. Dr. Cheragh is also a professor of surgery who has achieved the highest rank in his clinical and academic field.

== Education ==
Dr. Cherag completed the Massoud-i-Saad elementary school and subsequently attended the Naderia High School. Moreover, he entered the Kabul University Medical College in 1966. After receiving his Medical Doctorate degree in 1973, he was assigned as the Director of the Health Center at Baraki Rajan, in the Logar Province. Two years later, in 1975, he entered the American Care Medico program (in Ibn-i- Sina Hospital) for specialty training in Surgery which he successfully completed. He subsequently served as trainer and then supervisor in the Jumhooriate hospital in Kabul. From 1980 to 1986, Dr. Cheragh trained young physicians in Ibn-i-Sina Hospital in the Ghazni Province.

== Career ==
In 1987, Dr. Cheragh was appointed, at the request of Kunduz Physicians, as the chief of Public Health in the Province of Kunduz and the North East zone. In 1988 he was appointed as the chief of Surgery of the Jumhooriat Hospital and in 1989 served as the chief of Surgery in Baghlan Province, which was followed by a second term appointment as the Chief of Public Health in Kunduz and the North East zone.

In 1992, Dr. Cheragh returned to the Jumhooriat Hospital, in Kabul, and served as the chief of Surgery and the Physician- in – Chief of the hospital. From 1994 until the Transitional government, he served as Chief of Surgery (at the Jumhooriat Hospital) and chief of Thoracic Surgery (at the Kabul Thoracic Surgery clinic and Hospital). Moreover, at the beginning of the transitional government of Afghanistan, Dr.Cheragh was elected as the vice president for the academic affairs of the Kabul Institute of Medicine;

In 2002 he was also appointed as an advisor to the ministry of Higher Education. In 2003, Dr.Cheragh received the honor of being appointed as the President of the Kabul Institute of Medicine. Under Dr. Cheragh's leadership, the Kabul Institute of Medicine expanded to become the Kabul Medical University. Cheragh also served as chairman of the Kabul Academy of Medical Sciences.

Furthermore, Since 2005 Dr. Cheragh has been serving as the Medical advisor and the chief of Academic Affairs in the Ministry of Higher Education. Dr.Cheragh has been actively involved as an academician in the Kabul Medical College (now Kabul Medical University) since 1979. He had started there as an assistant Professor and eventually achieved the highest academic rank of full Professor. Over the many years of dedicated Public service, Dr. Cheragh has made a significant contribution in educating and training young Afghan Physicians and Surgeons. In 2009, Dr. Cheragh selected as a vice-presidential candidate by Dr. Abdullah Abdullah.

Since 2005 Dr.Cheragh has been serving as the Medical advisor in the Ministry of Higher Education.
