= Khoshi District =

District of Logar, Afghanistan

- District
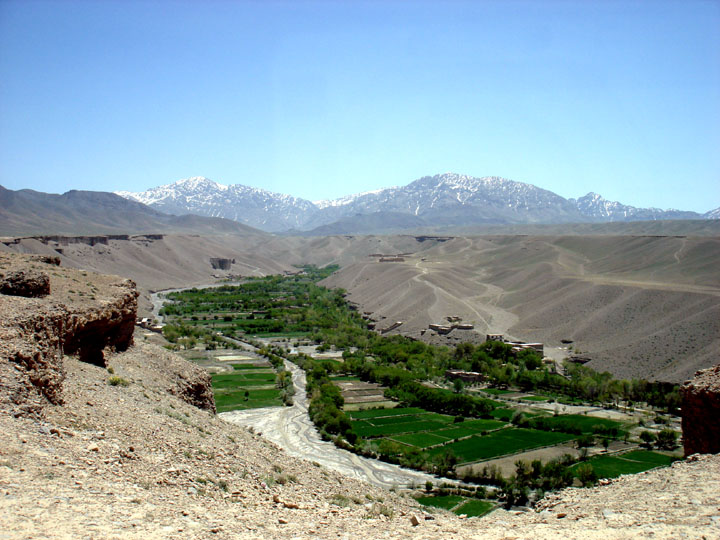
- Interactive map of Khoshi District
- Country: Afghanistan
- Province: Logar Province
- Time zone: UTC+4:30 (D† (Afghanistan Standard Time))

Khokhi District is located in the East part of Logar Province, Afghanistan. 80 km away from Kabul and 18 km from Pul-i-Alam centre of Logar Province. Centre of the district is called Khoshi and the population is made up of Pashtuns , Tajiks and Sadat, accounting for 65%, 34%, 1% of the total population respectively.

== Geography ==
Khoshi is a long narrow green valley, beginning from Qala-e-Wazer of Pul-i-Alam and ending into Lata Kora mountain in Dobandi with a length of 38 km. Khoshi is situated at an elevation of about 2,250 meters above sea level which, covering an area of 477 km^{2}. The district is surrounded by Mohammad Agha, Pul-i-Alam, Jaji, Azra and Baraki Barak.

=== Villages ===
The district has 86 villages and is divided into four parts (Khoshi, Karizona, Manai, and Dobandi). Main villages where Pashtuns are living are Dobandi, Manai, Darkh, Kandaw, Chenari, Tora Chena, Sher Agha, Baryam, fatihkhilo Karez, Darya Khan Karez, Sulimankhailo Karez, Degaan kariz, Kajer Karez, Gul Mohammad Khailo Karez and Sraghowanda.

The main villages of Khoshi are Abtak, Bala Deh, Meyana Deh and Payan Deh, where Tajiks live. Shia are living in Abtak, Bala Dah, Meyana Deh and Payan Deh of Khoshi. Dobandi is one of the most destroyed areas as it was on the main supply road for Mujahideen during the Russian invasion in Afghanistan.

== Demographics ==
The estimated population of Khoshi District in 2010 was roughly 30,000.

== Economic ==
The area has been severely affected by drought in the past four years. The socio-economic situation of the residents is poor. The main sources of income are from agriculture, selling of wood and trading inside Afghanistan or Pakistan.

== Education ==
There are around 4 high schools and 12 primary schools in the district.
