= 2011 Baraki Barak airstrike =

Coalition airstrike

Baraki Barak airstrike
- Part of the War in Afghanistan (2001–present)
- Type: Airstrike
- Location: Baraki Barak district, Logar province, Afghanistan
- Target: Local Taliban commander
- Date: August 26, 2011
- Executed by: NATO
- Casualties: 13 (including 6 civilians) killed

The Baraki Barak airstrike was a coalition airstrike that occurred on August 26, 2011, in Eastern Afghanistan. Six Afghan civilians from the same family were killed in the air strike in the Baraki Barak district of Logar province, Afghanistan. Four insurgents and three Afghan army members were also killed.

Logar provincial police chief Ghulam Sakhi Rogh Lewani said the operation had targeted a Taliban commander, Qari Hijran, who had a bounty on his head. The top official in the district, Mohammad Rahim Amin, claimed that the incident occurred when a local teacher provided shelter for the commander in his home.
