= Chak Dam =

Dam in Maidan Wardak Province of Afghanistan

- Location within Afghanistan
- Country: Afghanistan
- Location: Chak, Chak District, Maidan Wardak Province, Afghanistan
- Coordinates: 34.106728°N 68.578339°E
- Purpose: Irrigation and electricity
- Status: Operational
- Opening date: 1938
- Owner: Ministry of Energy and Water

Dam and spillways
- Type of dam: Gravity
- Impounds: Chak River

The Chak Dam (Pashto: چک برېښناکوټ), referred to by some as Band-e Chak (meaning Dam of Chak in Dari), is located near Chak, which is the center of Chak District in Maidan Wardak Province of Afghanistan. It is a hydroelectric gravity dam built by German engineers in 1938. It was mainly designed to regulate the flow of the Logar River and provide electricity to Kabul.

== History ==
Wardak province used to have a significant energy-generating capacity with the Chak Dam. Its four turbines could provide electricity to Maidan Wardak and parts of Kabul, Logar and Ghazni provinces.

In May 2005 the Chak Dam nearly overflowed as its main and emergency floodgates were rusted shut after six years of dry weather. The UN Development Programme, the Afghanistan Emergency Trust Fund, and the Ministry of Energy and Water took emergency action to address the threat. The co-operative effort saw a rapid response through immediate financing, planning and implementation of a 16 m (52 ft) ancillary gate that could hold the water while the rusted gates were lifted and repaired. The repairs were successful at a reported cost of $18,000 allowing evacuated residents to return to their homes in the valley.

== See also ==
- List of dams and reservoirs in Afghanistan
- List of power stations in Afghanistan
- Tourism in Afghanistan
