= Siraj al-Din al-Sajawandi =

Abū Tāhir Muhammad Sajāwandī
- Born: 12th century CE; Sajawand, Zabulistan, Ghaznavid Empire (modern-day Afghanistan)
- Died: 1203 CE; Sajawand, Zabulistan, Ghorid Empire (modern-day Afghanistan)

Academic background
- Influences: Muhammad ibn Musa al-Khwarizmi, Al Biruni

Academic work
- Era: Islamic Golden Age
- Main interests: Islamic inheritance jurisprudence, mathematics, astrology, geography, theology
- Notable works: The Sirajiyya, The Analogy for the Calculations, Treatise on Algebra
- Influenced: Ali ibn Mohammed al-Jurjani, Shahab ud-Din Ahmad ibn Mahmud al-Siwasi, Burhan ud-Din Haidar ibn Muhammad al-Hirwi, Shams ud-Din ibn Hamza al-Fanari, Abdul Karim ibn Muhammad al-Hamdani

Sirāj ud-Dīn Muhammad ibn Muhammad ibn 'Abd ur-Rashīd Sajāwandī (Persian: محمد ابن محمد ابن عبدالرشید سجاوندی) also known as Abū Tāhir Muhammad al-Sajāwandī al-Hanafī (Arabic: ابی طاهر محمد السجاوندي الحنفي) and the honorific Sirāj ud-Dīn (سراج الدین, "lamp of the faith") (died c. 1203 CE or 600 AH) was a 12th-century Hanafi scholar of Islamic inheritance jurisprudence, mathematics astrology and geography. He is primarily known for his work Kitāb al-Farāʼiḍ al-Sirājīyah (Arabic:کتاب الفرائض السراجیه), commonly known simply as "the Sirājīyah", which is a principal work on Hanafi inheritance law. The work was translated into English by Sir William Jones in 1792 for subsequent use in the courts of British India. He was the grand-nephew of qari Muhammad ibn Tayfour Sajawandi. He lies buried in the Ziārat-e Hazrat-o 'Āshiqān wa Ārifān in Sajawand.

== Name ==
His full name is Sirāj ud-Dīn Abū Tāhir Muḥammad Ibn Muhammad ibn 'Abd ur-Rashīd ibn Tayfoūr Sajāwandī (Persian: سراج الدین محمد سجاوندی). His nasab, Ibn Muhammad ibn 'Abd ur-Rashīd ibn Tayfoūr refers to him being the "son of Muhammad son of 'Abd ur-Rashīd son of Tayfour". Sajāwandī is his nisbah meaning "from Sajawand". He is also known by the teknonym Abū Tāhir meaning "father of Tahir".

== Works ==
- Kitāb al-Farāʼiẓ al-Sirājīyah (The Sirajite Book of Inhertiance laws, کتاب الفرائض السراجیه) a.k.a. al-Sirājīyah ("The Sirajite")
- al-Tajnīs Fī al-Hasāb (The Analogy for the Calculations, کتاب التجنیس فی الحساب)
- Resālat Fī al-Jabr wa al-Muqābilah (Treatise on Algebra, رسالة فی الجبر و المقابله)
