= Baraki Barak massacre =

War crime perpetrated by the Soviet Army

- Part of Atrocity crimes in the Soviet–Afghan War
- Map of Afghanistan with Logar highlighted
- Location: Baraki Barak District, Logar Province, Afghanistan
- Date: 10 September 1984
- Target: Afghan civilians and anti-communists
- Attack type: summary execution, massacre
- Deaths: ~40–45
- Perpetrator: USSR
- Motive: reprisals against civilians for anti-communist resistance members

The Baraki Barak massacre was a war crime perpetrated by the Soviet Army on 10 September 1984 in the Baraki Barak District, Logar Province, Afghanistan, during the Soviet–Afghan War. Reports indicate 40 people were killed.

According to the Human Rights Watch report, based on eyewitness testimonies, the Soviet army occupied the Baraki Barak District on 6 September during the Logar offensives. They were expecting reinforcements from the Afghan Democratic Republic army in Kabul, but one of the officers defected to anti-communist resistance members, taking a large part of convoy with him. As reprisals, the Soviet army arrested 40 local civilians, tied them up, poured gasoline over them and set them on fire, burning them alive.

According to a March 1985 Congressional Record report, 45 people were killed in the area. 30 were killed while on their way to Iran; some were burned alive with petrol; others had dynamite tied up to their backs and were blown up. Allegedly some were maimed by Russians. A man was robbed and shot in the foot.

== See also ==
- Laghman massacre
- Soviet war crimes

== Bibliography ==
- Human Rights Watch (1984). "Tears, Blood and Cries. Human Rights in Afghanistan Since the Invasion 1979–1984" (PDF). New York, Washington D.C.
