= Tera Pass =

- Interactive map of Tera Pass
- Elevation: 9,498 feet (2,895 m)
- Traversed by: Commercial and civilian traffic

Third Approach
- Location: Afghanistan
- Range: Hindukush Mountains
- Coordinates: 33°45′27.6″N 69°08′55.4″E

The Tera Pass is the primary route connecting Logar and Paktia provinces in Afghanistan. The pass was unimproved until 2006, when construction of a paved surface was completed as part of the ongoing international reconstruction effort.

== History ==
The pass has been in use since Antiquity, and serves as one of the primary passes connecting Kabul to India. Unlike the Khost-Gardez Pass to the south, the Tera Pass is only sporadically inhabited. Alternate passes exist through Logar's Kharwar district to the west.

== Geography ==
The pass crosses a rugged mountain ridge with nearby peaks topping out at 11,000'. The pass itself rises approximately 3,500' from the lowest part of Logar, and descends approximately 2,000' into the Gardez river valley to the south. The pass receives heavy snowfall during the winter months, often to the point of being impassable. Snow tends to persist into the summer months on the north-facing side of the mountain ridge.

== People ==
The Tera Pass area is largely uninhabited, with only minor settlements on the north side of the pass.

== Security ==
The pass is relatively secure, owing to the presence of ANP checkpoints, daunting geography and paved surface, which makes IED attacks more difficult.
