= Sayed Abdul Ghafar Sayed Zadah =

Afghan Lieutenant-General (born 1956)

Lieutenant General Sayed Abdul Ghafar دګرجنرال سیدعبدالغفار سید زاده

Director of counter criminal investigation directorate
- Incumbent
- Assumed office 7 August 2013

Personal details
- Born: 1956 (age 69–70) Logar Province, Afghanistan

Lieutenant General Sayed Abdul Ghafar Sayed zadah (سيد عبدالغفار سيدزاده) (born September 10, 1956), is an Afghan Lieutenant general. He served for more than 30 years in policing in Afghanistan; currently he is serving as General Chief of Herat police headquarters.

After graduation from high school, he joined the police academy in Kabul City (اكادمي پوليس). After three years of studies in various sections of police, mainly in Crime Investigation section.تحقيقات جنايي he graduated and passed with first position.

== Positions ==
General Sayed Zadah served for police force in the following positions at Afghanistan:

- Director of 10 District police Station.
- Senior Adviser of Kabul Police HQ.
- Director of anti prowl and Larceny Kabul Police HQ.
- First Director of Area Control in police History of Afghanistan.
- Senior Deputy of Kabul Police Crime Investigation Department (CID)
- Director of Surveillance and Discovery in Kabul Police HQ
- Senior Adviser of central Crime Investigation Department (MOI)
- Deputy Director of counter Drugs&Smuggling-(CCID-(MOI)
- Director of surveillance and Discovery(CCID)-(MOI)
- General Director of Kandahar Crime Investigation Department-CID-(2004–2006)
- Senior Adviser, and Senior collaborator of (MOI) Minister of Interior Affairs (Dr Zarar Ahmad Muqbil (2006–2007)
- General police chief and Commander of Nangarhar Province and Chief of Eastern Afghanistan Police (2007–2009), He served as police chief of Nangarhar province with struggle against the cultivation of poppy, Drug and Narcotic process and production, national and international Mafia, and Criminals, cleaning of the Feud and enmity between the Tribes and struggle for reconciles and support the peace process, Education and Islamic Democracy for Women and human rights and Rebuilding and Constructions of their homeland. During his 2-year duty and his 24-hours efforts, he changed Nangarhar province as the most peaceful province of Afghanistan which still people are witnesses.
- General Chief of Kabul Criminal Investigation Department (CID) Kabul Police HQ (2009-7/2010) Served as a General Chief of Criminal Investigation Department/CID, Kabul Police HQ, with many achievements and struggles against the Social Crimes a Huge Strike on Kidnappers and thefts, and Struggle Against Bribery. He led during the 2009 elections.
- In March 2010, he was granted/awarded the BRAVERY AND COURAGE Official Medal of Afghanistan Islamic Republic from President Hamid Karzai, after counteracting and destroying of Insurgents and Suicide Attackers In Safi Land Mark.
- In June 2010, he was promoted from Brigadier general rank to Major General Rank by proposal of Minister of Interior of Afghanistan and approval of president Hamid Karzai.
- Worked as General Director of Counter Terrorism Police Ministry of Interior MOI (7/2010-2011) and dissolved all the private security companies according to decree of president.
- General Director of GDPSU(General Directorate of Police Special Unit)(2011–2012) with highest achievement and success in history of police in commando operation and anti suicide attack operations under his direct command.
- on January-09-2012 got assigned as Director General of Central Criminal investigation Department by the president of Afghanistan Hamid Karzai till present.

In an Extraordinary Decree of President of Islamic Republic of Afghanistan Hamid Karzai, he was assigned as General Commander of Herat Police and Granted with Special reward the lieutenant General Rank. General Sayed Zadah has written a book by the name of POLICE YA TABIBE AMRAZ-E-EJTIMAYEE (police, The Doctor of Social Disease and Problems, along with innumerable strategies like (how to cope with narcotic) and many topics and guidelines to CID police and anti narcotic police of interior ministry.
