= Muhammad ibn Tayfour Sajawandi =

Islamic scholar, mystic, and theologian

Shams ul-'Ārefīn Abu'l-Fazl Ibn Tayfour Sajāwandī
- Born: late 11th century CE; Sajawand, Zabulistan, Ghaznavid Empire (modern-day Afghanistan)
- Died: 1165 CE

Academic work
- Main interests: Tajwid, Sufism
- Notable works: Kitāb al-Waqf wa al-Ibtidāʾ, Jāmiʿ al-Wuqūf wa al-Āy

ʿAbū ʿAbdullāh Muhammad Ibn ʿAbū Yazīd Tayfūr Sajāvandī Ghaznavī (Persian: ابو عبدالله محمد ابن ابو یزید طیفور سجاوندی غزنوی), also known as Abū al-Fazl as-Sajāwandī al-Qāriʾ (Arabic: أبو الفضل السجاوندي القارئ) (died 1165 CE or 560 AH) was a 12th-century Islamic scholar, mystic, Qāriʾ and theologian. He is primarily known for his contributions to the Islamic traditions of recitation and pronunciation, creating a set of rules and markers used to indicate the pronunciation and pauses of Quranic recital, known as Sajawandi stop signs or Rumuz al-Awqaf as-Sajāwandī. He is also credited as being the first known person to use coloured circles as a means of separating verses in the Quran, a design choice which has persisted til today, with the addition of a verse number inside of the circle. In Persian, the term muṣ·ḥaf sajāwandī مُصْحَف سَجَاوَنْدِي ("a Sajawandi book/ mus'haf") may today be used to denote an elegantly written Quran, accounting for the association between Sajawandi and his use of lavish red and golden dots as pause markers. His son Ahmad ibn Muhammad Sajawandi was also a well-known chronicler, commentator on the Quran, poet and orator.

== Name ==
His full name is Abu'l Fazl Muḥammad Ibn Ṭayfūr Sajāwandī Ghaznavī (Persian: ابوالفضل محمد ابن طیفور سجاوندی غزنوی), though in short form he is commonly known simply by this nasab Ibn Ṭayfūr ("son of Tayfour") Sajāwandī. Sajāwandī and Ghaznavī are his nisbahs meaning "from/ of Sajawand" and "from/ of Ghazna", respectively. He is known by a number of teknonyms, mainly ʿAbū al-Fazl meaning "father of al-Fazl", ʿAbū ʿAbdullāh meaning "father of Abdullah" and ʿAbū Jaʿfar meaning "father of Ja'far". He is likewise attested with a number of honorifics such as Shams ad-Dīn (Arabic: شمس الدين "Sun of the Islamic Faith"), Burhān ud-Dīn (Arabic: برهان الدین "Proof/ Witness of the Islamic Faith") and Shams ul-'Ārefīn (Persian/ Perso-Arabic: شمس العارفین "Sun of the Saints").

== Life ==
He was born in the town of Sajawand in the Ghaznavid Empire at the end of the 11th century. Little of his life is known, however while being noted mainly for his work in tajwid as well as his Quranic recitation manuals, he has also been remembered as a noteworthy mystic, earning him honorifics such as Imām al-Zamān, Shams ad-Dīn and Shams ul-'Ārefīn. This suggests that he must have had quite a large following during his lifetime. He would've been a contemporary with Sana'i, however it is not known if he likewise had any association to the court of Bahram Shah (who ruled 1117-1157 CE). He was part of a line of influential Ghaznavid-era imams from Sajawand, with a certain Imam Yunus Sajawandi appearing in the Jawami ul-Hikayat wa Lawami ur-Riwayat of Muhammad Aufi as an influential figure at the court of Ibrahim of Ghazna (ruling 1059-99 CE) only two generation before. Out of his four known sons, Imam Ahmad Sajawandi as well as his grand-nephew Imam Siraj ud-Din Muhammad Sajawandi were also religious leaders and great scholars in their own right.

== Signs of Sajawandi ==
Sajawandi, in his book Kitāb al-Waqf wa al-Ibtidāʾ, identified five degrees to which recommendation to whether or not pausing in-between recited sentences may alter the understood meaning of the section of text or not. Summarizing these five recommendations, he set a sign to each of them for the Qāriʾ to have as a reminder when reciting each Quranic sentence, including a sixth sign for situations where stopping is prohibited.

These six signs can be summarized thusly:

- ^{ط} : An abbreviation of the word waqf muṭ·laq وَقْف مُطْلَق (universal stop). It implies that the statement stands completed at this point. Therefore, it is better to stop here.
- ^{ج} : An abbreviation of the word waqf jā’iz وَقْف جَائِز (permissible stop) and it implies that it is permissible to stop here.
- ^{ز} : An abbreviation of waqf mujawwaz وَقْف مُجَوَّز (permitted stop), which implies that stopping here is permissible but that it is better not to.
- ^{ص} : An abbreviation of waqf murakh·khas وَقْف مُرَخَّص (dispensation stop), which implies that the statement has not yet been completed but that, because the sentence has become long, this is the place to breathe and stop rather than elsewhere.
- ^{م} : An abbreviation of waqf lāzim وَقْف لَازِم (mandatory stop), which means that if a stop is not made an outrageous distortion in the meaning of the verse is possible. Some phoneticians of the Quran have also called this type of stop a waqf wājib وَقْف وَاجِب (obligatory stop). Note that wājib (وَاجِب) here is not a legal term and therefore does not entail sin if it is abandoned. The purpose of the term is to stress that stopping here is the most preferable of all stops.
- ^{لا} : An abbreviation of la taqif/ la tawaqqif' لَا تَوَقِّف (lit. do not stop). It indicates that one should not stop at this sign but does not imply that stopping is completely impermissible, since there are certain places bearing this sign where stopping entails no harm and resuming from the following word is also permissible. Therefore, the correct meaning of this sign is: “If a stop is made here, it is better to go back and read over again. Initiation from the next word is not preferred.

== Works ==
- Kitāb al-Waqf wa al-Ibtidāʾ (Book of the Stop and Commencement, کتاب الوقف و الابتداء)
- Gharāʾib al-Qurʾān (Oddities of the Quran, غرائب القرآن)
- ʿIlal al-Qurʾān or Jāmiʿ al-Wuqūf wa al-Āy (Reasons of the Quran or Collection of the Stops and the Specifics, علل القرآن / جامع الوقوف والآي)
- Maʿrefa ʾAḥzāb al-Qurʾān wa ʾAnsāfah wa ʾArbāʿah wa ʾajzāʾah (Introduction to the Parts of the Quran and its Divisions, Quarters and Components, معرفه أحزاب القرآن وأنصافه وأرباعه وأجزائه)
- ʿAyn al-Maʿānī Fī Tafsīr al-Kitāb al-Azīz wa as-Sabʿi al-Mathānī (The Essential Significance of Commentary on the Great Book and its First Seven Chapters, عين المعاني في تفسیر الکتاب العزيز والسبع المثاني)
