= Wardak Vase =

Ancient Buddhist vase

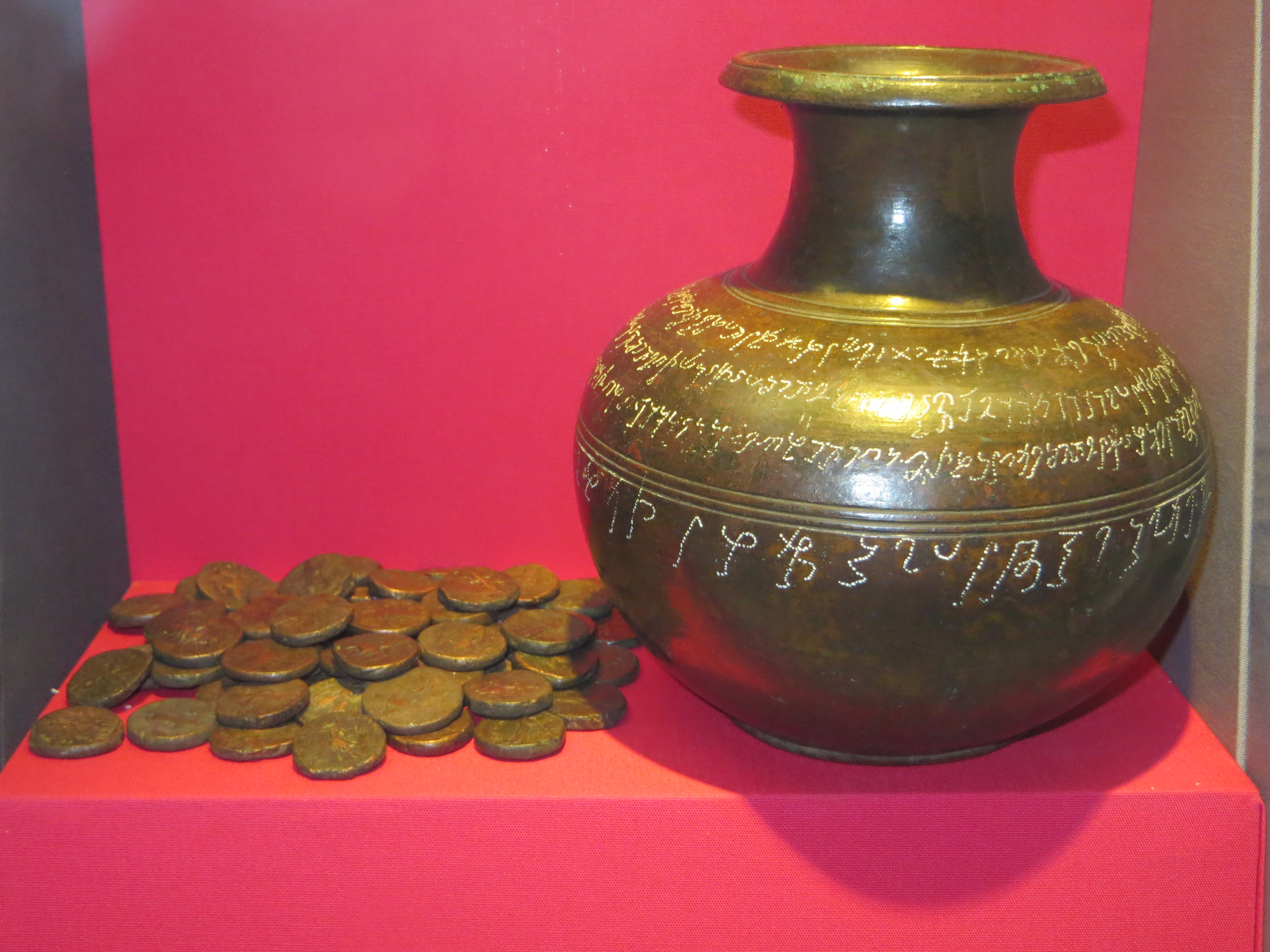
- Wardak Vase and coins displayed in the British Museum
- Material: Copper alloy
- Size: Height 17.8 cm
- Created: 2nd Century AD
- Present location: British Museum, London
- Registration: OA 1880-93;CM 1979-2-15-21 to 41

The Wardak Vase is an ancient globular-shaped buddhist copper vase that was found as part of a stupa relic deposit in the early nineteenth century in the Wardak Province of Afghanistan. The importance of the vase lies in the long Kharoshthi inscription which dates the objects to around 178 AD and claims that the stupa contained the sacred relics of the Buddha. Since 1880, the vase has been part of the British Museum's Asian collection.

== Discovery ==
The vase, coins and other relics were found by the British adventurer and archaeologist Charles Masson in 1836. The vase was unearthed in one of the Buddhist relic deposits (stupas) in the district of Wardak about 80 km (50 mi) south-west of Kabul in Afghanistan. Unusually, Masson did not supervise the excavation himself and did not provide details of exactly where the individual artefacts were found. (Note: As explained by Fussman in 1974, Wardak or Maidan Wardak is now the name of a province in eastern Afghanistan. The location of the stupas has been identified by Fussman at coordinates 34°7′18.1″N 68°30′2″E. The site is about 80 km (50 mi) (as the crow flies) southwest of Kabul in the valley of the Chak River. Downstream the Chak River becomes the Logar River. Fussman's plan of the site is redrawn in Errington, 2017 but upside-down with the north and south directions switched.) The finds arrived in London in 1839, where they became part of the Indian Museum's collection. In 1880, they were transferred to the British Museum. (Note: The finds from Wardak were listed when the articles were dispatched by Masson from Kabul to Colonel Pottinger on 18 October 1836. The list included 11 groups of items. Group 1 included the Wardak Vase: "A copper vessel with dotted Pehlevi [Kharoshthi] inscription, containing sundry relics. To this belong 66 copper coins separately placed in a bag." Several other groups on the list included reliquaries but these cannot now be traced.)

== Description ==
The Wardak Vase is spherical in shape and made of copper alloy. The vase has a slim neck with an inverted rim and a low flat base. It measures 17.6 cm (6.9 in) in height, with the largest diameter of 16.9 cm (6.7 in) and a neck of diameter 9.7 cm (3.8 in). It has a series of three parallel grooves running around the middle of the vase and a second set of grooves running around the vase just below the neck. Engraved on the shoulder of the vase between the upper and lower grooves are three lines of Kharoshthi script. Below the lower set of grooves is a fourth line in larger letters. The text dates the vase and deposits to around 178 AD. With the vase were found a number of beads and sixty-six coins. The coins have not been identified among the museum's collection. Masson mentions that they were of the "Indo-Scythic class", which implies that they would have been of the Kushan kings Vima Kadphises, Kanishka I and Huvishka.

== Inscription ==
The long inscription refers to the Kushan year 51; Kanishka I reigned c. AD 127 to 151. The text mentions Kanishka's successor Huvishka who ruled c. AD 151 to 190; it thus provides useful evidence for reconstructing the chronological reigns of the Kushan royalty. The inscription also indicates that the monastery was built by the Mahasanghikas, one of the earliest buddhist schools in India, who were based at Mathura, near Delhi. The vase therefore provides evidence for the widespread distribution of Buddhism in South Asia almost 2000 years ago.

Inscription of the Wardak Vase
Inscription	Original (Kharosthi script)	Transliteration	English translation
Line 1	𐨯𐨎 𐩅 𐩅 𐩄 𐩀 𐨨𐨯 𐨀𐨪𐨿𐨠𐨨𐨁𐨯𐨁𐨩 𐨯𐨯𐨿𐨟𐨅𐨱𐨁 𐩄 𐩃 𐩀 𐨀𐨁𐨨𐨅𐨞 𐨒𐨜𐨁𐨒𐨅𐨞 𐨐𐨨𐨒𐨂𐨫𐨿𐨩𐨤𐨂𐨟𐨿𐨪𐨬𐨒𐨨𐨪𐨅𐨒 𐨯 𐨀𐨁𐨭 𐨑𐨬𐨡𐨨𐨁 𐨐𐨡𐨫𐨩𐨁𐨒𐨬𐨒𐨨𐨪𐨅𐨒𐨬𐨁𐨱𐨪𐨨𐨿𐨨𐨁 𐨠𐨂𐨦𐨨𐨿𐨨𐨁 𐨧𐨒𐨬𐨡 𐨭𐨐𐨿𐨩𐨨𐨂𐨞𐨅 𐨭𐨪𐨁𐨪 𐨤𐨪𐨁𐨛𐨬𐨅𐨟𐨁	saṃ 20 20 10 1 masa arthamisiya sastehi 10 4 1 imeṇa gaḍigeṇa kamagulyaputra vagamarega sa iśa khavadami kadalayiga vagamaregaviharammi thu[ba]mmi bhagavada śakyamuṇe śarira pariṭhaveti	In the year 51, in the month Artemisios, on the 15th day, in this moment Kamagulya's son Vagamarega here in Khavada in the Kadalayiga Vagamarega Monastery a stupa for the relics of the Lord, the Śākya Sage, establishes
Line 2	𐨀𐨁𐨨𐨅𐨞 𐨐𐨂𐨭𐨫𐨨𐨂𐨫𐨅𐨞 𐨨𐨱𐨪𐨗𐨪𐨗𐨟𐨁𐨪𐨗𐨱𐨂𐨬𐨅𐨮𐨿𐨐𐨯 𐨀𐨒𐨿𐨪𐨧𐨒𐨀𐨅 𐨧𐨬𐨟𐨂 𐨨𐨡𐨤𐨁𐨱𐨪 𐨨𐨅 𐨤𐨂𐨩𐨀𐨅 𐨧𐨬𐨟𐨂 𐨧𐨿𐨪𐨱𐨪 𐨨𐨅 𐨱𐨮𐨿𐨠𐨂𐨞𐨏𐨨𐨪𐨅𐨒𐨯 𐨤𐨂𐨩𐨀𐨅 𐨧𐨬𐨟𐨂 𐨩𐨆 𐨕 𐨨𐨅 𐨧𐨂𐨩 𐨞𐨟𐨁𐨒𐨨𐨁𐨟𐨿𐨪𐨯𐨎𐨧𐨟𐨁𐨒𐨞 𐨤𐨂𐨩𐨀𐨅 𐨧𐨬𐨟𐨂 𐨨𐨱𐨁𐨩 𐨕 𐨬𐨒𐨨𐨪𐨁𐨒𐨯 𐨀𐨒𐨿𐨪𐨧𐨒𐨤𐨜𐨁𐨩𐨎𐨭𐨀𐨅	imeṇa kuśalamuleṇa maharajarajatirajahuveṣkasa agrabhagae bhavatu madapidara me puyae bhavatu bhradara me haṣthunaḥmaregasa puyae bhavatu yo ca me bhuya ṇatigamitrasaṃbhatigaṇa puyae bhavatu mahiya ca vagamaregasa agrabhagapaḍiyaṃśae	Through this root of good may it be the best lot of the great king, chief of kings, Huviṣka; may it be in honour of my mother and father; may it be in honour of my brother Haṣthunaḥ-marega; and may it be in honour of my further relatives, friends, and associates; may it be the best share and lot of me, Vagamarega;
Line 3	𐨧𐨬𐨟𐨂 𐨯𐨪𐨿𐨬𐨯𐨟𐨿𐨬𐨞 𐨀𐨪𐨆𐨒𐨡𐨐𐨿𐨮𐨁𐨞𐨀𐨅 𐨧𐨬𐨟𐨂 𐨀𐨬𐨁𐨩𐨞𐨪𐨒𐨤𐨪𐨿𐨩𐨟 𐨩𐨬 𐨧𐨬𐨒𐨿𐨪 𐨩𐨆 𐨀𐨟𐨿𐨪 𐨀𐨎𐨟𐨪 𐨀𐨎𐨜𐨗𐨆 𐨗𐨫𐨩𐨂𐨒 𐨭𐨭𐨿𐨬𐨅𐨟𐨁𐨒 𐨀𐨪𐨂𐨤𐨿𐨩𐨟 𐨯𐨪𐨿𐨬𐨁𐨞 𐨤𐨂𐨩𐨀𐨅 𐨧𐨬𐨟𐨂 𐨨𐨱𐨁𐨩 𐨕 𐨪𐨆𐨱𐨞 𐨯𐨡 𐨯𐨪𐨿𐨬𐨁𐨞 𐨀𐨬𐨮𐨟𐨿𐨪𐨁𐨒𐨞 𐨯𐨤𐨪𐨁𐨬𐨪 𐨕 𐨀𐨒𐨿𐨪𐨧𐨒𐨤𐨜𐨁𐨩𐨎𐨭𐨀𐨅 𐨧𐨬𐨟𐨂 𐨨𐨁𐨠𐨿𐨩𐨒𐨯 𐨕 𐨀𐨒𐨿𐨪𐨧𐨒 𐨧𐨬𐨟𐨂	bhavatu sarvasatvaṇa arogadakṣinae bhavatu aviyaṇaragaparyata yava bhavagra yo atra aṃtara aṃḍajo jalayuga śaśvetiga arupyata sarviṇa puyae bhavatu mahiya ca rohaṇa sada sarviṇa avaṣatrigaṇa saparivara ca agrabhagapaḍiyaṃśae bhavatu mithyagasa ca agrabhaga bhavatu	may it be for the reward of health of all beings; and, from the boundary of the Avīci Hell to the top of existence, whether egg-born, womb-born, moisture-born, formless, may it be for the honour of all; and may it always be for the best lot and share of my horsemen, with all umbrella-bearers and with the retinue; and may there be a best lot for the one who is wrong.
Line 4	𐨀𐨅𐨮 𐨬𐨁𐨱𐨪 𐨀𐨕𐨪𐨩𐨞 𐨨𐨱𐨯𐨎𐨓𐨁𐨒𐨞 𐨤𐨪𐨁𐨒𐨿𐨪𐨱	eṣa vihara acarayaṇa mahasaṃghigaṇa parigraha	This monastery is in the possession of Mahāsāṃghika teachers.

== Similar vase ==
The description of a similar vase that is privately owned was published in 2008. It bears a closely related inscription and the original content has been conserved. The Kharoshthi inscription records that the relics were consecrated on the same day in Kanishka year 51 (c. AD 178) by the daughter of "Vagamarega", the donor of the Wardak Vase. The contents of the vase included a relic container made of silver, a folded sheet of birch bark and 21 coins. Of these, 19 were Kushan bronze coins but two were much later Napki Malka silver coins of the Nezak Huns indicating that the relics had been re-deposited in the 5th–6th century.

== Sources ==
- Baums, David (2012). "Catalog and revised texts and translations of Gandharan reliquary inscriptions" (PDF). In Jongeward, D.; Errington, E.; Salomon, R.; Baums, S. (eds.). Gandharan Buddhist reliquaries. Seattle: University of Washington Press. pp. 200–309. ISBN 978-0-295-99236-5.
- Bracey, Robert (2017). "The date of Kanishka since 1960". Indian Historical Review. 44 (1): 21–61. doi:10.1177/0376983617694717. S2CID 149016806.
- Errington, Elizabeth (2017a). Charles Masson and the Buddhist Sites of Afghanistan: Explorations, Excavations, Collections 1832-1835. British Museum Research Publication 215. London: British Museum Press. ISBN 978-0-86159-215-9.
- Errington, Elizabeth (2017b). The Charles Masson Archive: British Library, British Museum and Other Documents Relating to the 1832–1838 Masson Collection from Afghanistan. British Museum Research Publication 216. London: British Museum Press. ISBN 978-0-86159-216-6.
- Falk, Harry (2008). "Another reliquary vase from Wardak and consecrating fire rites in Gandhāra". In Bautze-Picron, Claudine (ed.). Religion and Art: New issues in Indian iconography and iconology. Vol. 1 of the Proceedings of the 18th Conference of the European Association of South Asian Archaeologists, London, 2005. London: The British Association for South Asian Studies. pp. 63–80. ISBN 978-0-9553924-2-9.
- Fussman, Gérard (1974). "Ruines De La Vallée De Wardak". Arts Asiatiques (in French). 30: 65–130. doi:10.3406/arasi.1974.1086. JSTOR 43485375.
- Konow, Sten (1929). Kharoshṭhī Inscriptions with the Exception of those of Aśoka, Corpus Inscriptionum Indicarum. Vol. 2, Part 1. Calcutta, India: Government of India.
- Masson, Charles (1841). "Memoir on the topes and sepulchral monuments of Afghanistan". In Wilson, H.H. (ed.). Ariana Antiqua: A Descriptive Account of the Antiquities and Coins of Afghanistan. London: East India Company. pp. 55–118.
