= Afghanistan Emergency Trust Fund =

United Nations humanitarian aid

According to the United Nations's Office for the Coordination of Humanitarian Affairs, the Afghanistan Emergency Trust Fund was established in June 1988 by the Secretary-General. The Afghanistan Emergency Trust Fund ceased financing activities in 2009. It channeled funds received from donors for humanitarian activities in Afghanistan. The fund supported the Office of the Deputy Special Representative of the Secretary-General to the United Nations Assistance Mission in Afghanistan, providing grants to non-governmental organizations working to address rehabilitation needs, and supporting humanitarian and economic development activities.

As of 2011, it was in the process of closing its operations.

== Initiatives ==
In 2005 the fund supported an effort to make emergency repairs to the Chak E Wardak Dam in order to prevent an impending overflow. Since June 2007 it provided some funding to the United Nations Development Programme's Comprehensive Disaster Risk Reduction Project.
