= Baraki Rajan =

Baraki Rajan باراکي راجان
- town
- Location in Afghanistan
- Coordinates: 33°58′9″N 68°56′41″E
- Country: Afghanistan
- Province: Logar Province
- District: Baraki Barak District
- Elevation: 6,293 ft (1,918 m)

Population
  - Total: 22,622
- Time zone: UTC+4:30 (IRST)
  - Summer (DST): UTC+5:30 (IRDT)

Barakī Rajan (Pashto: باراکي راجان Dari: باراکي راجان) is a town and the center of Baraki Barak District, Logar Province, Afghanistan. It was also the former capital of Logar Province. The town is in a mountainous area in the valley of the Logar River. The main road Ghazni-Kabul passes about 20 km to the West of the town. The town is named after the historical Ormur tribe, also locally known as Baraki.

== Ethnography ==
Baraki Rajan has historically been home to the Ormur tribe, also known as "Burki" or "Baraki", and to other Pashtuns and Tajiks. The town is named after the Baraki people, some of whom still speak the Ormuri (Baraki) language; they live to the northwest and west of the town, and also inside the town.

== See also ==
- Kaniguram
- Baraki Rajan
