= Ahmad ibn Muhammad Sajawandi =

12th-century Islamic poet and orator

Abū Badīl Ahmad ibn Muhammad Sajāwandī (Persian: ابوبدیل احمد بن محمد سجاوندی) (died 1176 CE or 571 AH) was a 12th-century chronicler, commentator on the Quran, poet and orator. He was the son of the scholar Muhammad ibn Tayfour Sajawandi. He is mentioned in the Lubab ul-Albab ("Heart of hearts") of Aufi and the Chahar Maqalah ("Four Discourses") of Nizami Aruzi as a great poet and orator at the court of Tughan-Shah Ibn Alp Arslan (reigning Herat in the mid-11th century), under the name Malik al-Kalām Majd ad-Dīn Aḥmad Badi'hī Sajāwandī. However, as this event must have preceded Abu Badil's lifetime by close to a century, it is likely that these individuals have been confused from an early date, with Malik al-Kalām Aḥmad Badi'hī ("the king of speech") being known for his poetry, and Imâm-e Kabīr Ahmad ibn Muhammad Sajāwandī ("the great Imam") for his religious scholarship.

== Name ==
His full name is ʿAbū Badīl Aḥmad Ibn Muhammad Ibn Tayfour Sajāwandī (Persian: ابوبدیل احمد ابن محمد ابن طیفور سجاوندی). Sajāwandī is his nisbah meaning "from Sajawand". He is mentioned by the honorifics Majd ad-Dīn (مجد الدین "splendour of the faith") and Imâm-e Kabīr (امام کبیر "the Great Imam").

== Work ==
- ʾInsān ʿAyn al-Maʿānī (The Essential Significance of Humanity, إنسان عين المعاني), a commentary on his fathers work, the ʿAyn al-Maʿānī Fī Tafsīr al-Kitāb al-Azīz wa as-Sabʿi al-Mathānī (The Essential Significance of Commentary on the Great Book and its First Seven Chapters, عين المعاني في تفسیر الکتاب العزيز والسبع المثاني).
- Zokhāyer-e Samâr dar Maʿânī-e Akhbâr-e Sayyid Mokhtâr (The Beneficial Reservoir of Sayyid Mokhtar's Significant Instructions, ذخایر ثمار در معانی اخبار سید مختار)
