= Chak District =

Settlement in Wardak Province, Afghanistan

Chak چک
- District
- Location in Afghanistan
- Coordinates: 34°06′30.80″N 68°34′47.19″E
- Country: Afghanistan
- Province: Maidan Wardak Province
- Administrative center: Chak
- Time zone: UTC+04:30 (AFT)

Chak (Pashto: چک) is a district in the southern part of Maidan Wardak Province of Afghanistan. Its population was estimated at 83,376 in 2005, the last year for which figures are available. The administrative center of Chak district is the town of Chak.

Chak District is within the heartland of the Wardak tribe of Pashtuns. To its southeast is Saydabad District, to the northeast Nirkh District, and to the northwest is Day Mirdad District.

== History ==
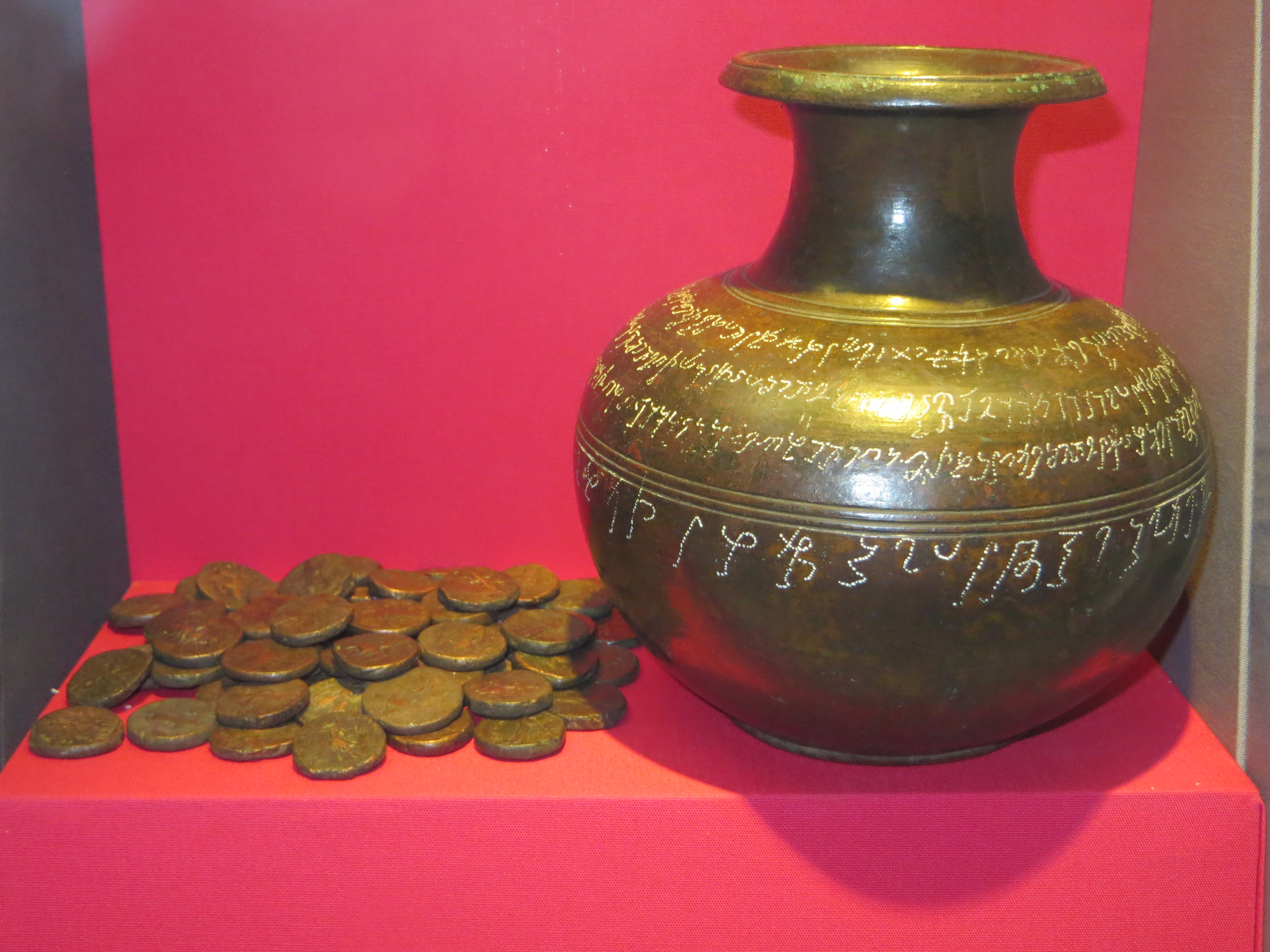
Wardak Vase and coins in the British Museum

Outside the district of Chak there are many ancient Buddhist remains, including a fortified monastery and six stupas, one of which contained a bronze vase with a Kharoshthi inscription that held 61 Kushan coins, which is now in the British Museum's collection.

== See also ==
- Districts of Afghanistan
- Chak Dam
