= Puli Alam District =

District of Logar Province, Afghanistan

- District
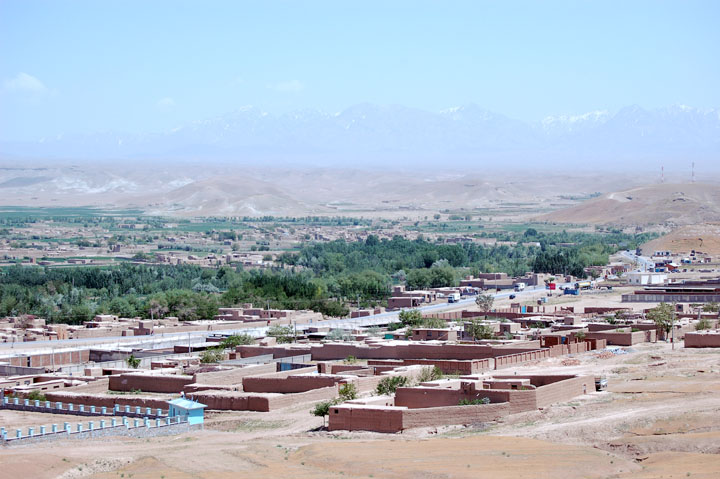
- Puli Alam in 2007
- Interactive map of Puli Alam District
- Country: Afghanistan
- Province: Logar Province
- Time zone: UTC+4:30 (D† (Afghanistan Standard Time))

Puli Alam, also spelled Pul-i-Alam or Pol-e Alam, is a district of Logar Province, Afghanistan. The population of Puli Alam is estimated at around 108,000, which is composed of Pashtuns, Tajiks and a few others. The capital of the district is Puli Alam city, which is also the provincial capital.

Puli Alam has undergone reconstruction work after the fall of Taliban government.

A Provincial Reconstruction Team (PRT) of the Czech Republic is based in the district.

== Security and politics ==
It was reported on 23 November 2009 that unknown armed men destroyed a girls' school in the district's headquarters.

== See also ==
- Districts of Afghanistan
