= Zabulistan =

Historical Region

Zabulistan (Persian: زابلستان, Zābolistān, Persian: [zɒːbolest̪ɒːn], Zāwulistān or simply زابل, Persian: [zɒːbol]), is an ancient and medieval name for a historical region that included mainly southern Afghanistan as well as southeastern Iran.

By the tenth century, Iranian sources mention Zabulistan as part of the Khorasan marches, a frontier region between Khorasan and India. In the Tarikh-i Sistan, finished around 1062 CE, the author regards Zabol as part of the land of Sistan, stretching from the Hamun Oasis all the way to the Indus River.

Today, the Afghan province of Zabul and the Iranian city of Zabol take their names from the historical region. Zabulistan has become popularized as the birthplace of the character Rostam of Ferdowsi's Shahnameh, in which the word "Zabulistan" is used interchangeably with "Sistan", which is the same historical region, located in present-day southern Afghanistan (Nimruz, Helmand, Zabul and Kandahar) and some parts of Iran (Sistan and Baluchestan Province).

== Names ==
Zābulistān (Persian: زابلستان) which is the Persian name literally means "the land of Zābol". The etymology of the name Zābol has been marred with speculation. The German historian Marquart, proposed the word, including its uncommon Medieval variant Jāwulistān (Persian: جابلستان) as being a variation of the Sanskrit term. Others have speculated that the word zābol might be an abbreviation of zūnbīl, a supposed royal title of the region known from Arabic sources, earlier read as rutbīl, and now used to refer to a local dynasty of Zamindawar now called the Zunbils. This notion however currently stands on loose ground, and Minorsky holds that the consonant resemblance between these two words look merely fortuitous.

Jāguḍa (Sanskrit: जागुड), meaning saffron, was the Sanskrit name of the region. It is also regarded as being referred to by this name in 644 CE by the Chinese traveling monk Xuanzang in the Chinese transliteration Tsau-kü-ta.

== Geography ==
The earliest detailed description of Zabulistan comes from the Great Tang Records on the Western Regions, written by the travelling monk Xuanzang in the early seventh century. He places the country of Tsau-kü-ta (Jāguḍa) between the Great Snowy Mountains (the Hindu Kush) and the Black Range (probably the Sulaiman mountains), bordering the country of Vrjisthāna in the north, Kāpiśī to its north-east and Kaikānān to its east. While the Chinese pilgrims never explored the south or west of the region, it is known from later Arabic accounts that Zabulistan at this time was bordered by Turan to its south and Rukhkhudh to its west.

"The country of Jāguda is more than seven thousand li in circuit, and its capital city, named Hexina (Ghazni), is over thirty li in circuit; but the capital is sometimes located in the city of Hesaluo (Guzar), which is also over thirty li in circuit, both cities being strongly fortified in invulnerable positions. The mountains and valleys are rich in natural resources, and the cultivated farmlands, divided by ridges, are high and dry. Crops are sown in proper seasons. Winter wheat is abundant, and vegetation is luxuriant with profuse flowers and fruits. The soil is good for growing aromatic turmeric, and it produces the hingu herb (Ferula asafoetida), which grows in the Rama-Indu Valley. In the city of Hesaluo there are gushing springs, the water of which flows to all sides, and the people make use of it for irrigation. The climate is severely cold with much frost and snow." - Xuanzang, 644 CE

During the Medieval Islamic era, the region is continuously mentioned in geographical works such as Istakhri's Kitab al-Masalik (930-933 CE), the Hudud al 'Alam (982 CE), Qazvīnī's Nuzhat al-Qulub etc.

== History ==
=== Pre-Islamic period ===
The first mentions of the region coincides with its takeover by the Iranian Huns in the 4th century. Initially being conquered by the Alkhan, then the Nezaks in the 5th century. The region fell to the Turk Shahis in the 7th century, then being controlled by a collection loose suzerains of the Hindu Shahis to the 10th century. According to Andre Wink:

It is clear however that in the seventh to ninth centuries the Zunbils and their kinsmen the Kabulshahs ruled over a predominantly Indian rather than a Persianate realm. The Arab geographers, in effect, commonly speak of 'that king of al-Hind ... (who) bore the title of Zunbil'.

The region was finally conquered and Islamized by the Ghaznavids after 961 CE.

==== The Alkhans ====
The first mentions of the word Zabol is from coinage of what's known as "the early anonymous clan-rulers". These were late fourth-century tribal chiefs and possibly former governors of the Sasanids from the north of the Hindu Kush, who following the course of the Kidarites, declared independence from Sasanid dominance. By 384/5 CE, they controlled Kāpiśī and Gandhara, and started minting their own characteristic coins in the formerly Sasanian mint. A set of these anonymous coins including some of the coins of king Khingila I, the first of Alkhan kings known by name, bore the legend Shāh Zāwbul Ālkhān (Bactrian: ϸαυο ζαοβλ αλχανο) translated as 'King of Zabol Alkhan'. This suggests Alkhan control of the Zabulistan region from an early time of Alkhan dominance in the region. Alkhan power, primarily based in the Kapisa and Gandhara valleys, was seldom concentrated with one king alone, as shown by the variety of Alkhan coins minted simultaneously in the different regions of the empire's control, which by 484 CE reached all the way to Mawla in Central India. Northern Zabulistan is understood to have remained under nominal control of the Alkhan rulers of Kāpiśī, with the rest remaining under nominal Sasanid rule until Peroz I's defeat by the Hephthalites in 484 CE, which facilitated the takeover of Zabulistan by the new independent ruler Nezak Shah.

==== The Nezaks ====
Following the collapse of Sasanid control in Tokharistan in 484 CE, and with Alkhan coinage expanding into the Indian subcontinent, numismatic evidence accounts for the consolidation of a new dynasty in Kapisa and Zabul. The Nezak Shah dynasty, identified through their unique coin designs and the Pahlavi Nezak Shah stamp (previously interpreted by Göbl as Napki MLK) on their coins, supposedly opened a mint in Ghazni (which's coins are identified by Göbl as the š-group of Nezak coinage) following 484 CE. Later, they managed to also consolidate their rule over Kāpiśī, where they overtook the local mint around the first quarter of the 6th-century CE (whose coins are identified by Göbl as the ā-group). Unlike the contemporary Hephthalites and Alkhan, they did not use a tamga, but instead donned a golden winged bull-headed crown as their primary signifier.

Sometime after 532 CE, after Mihrakulas devastating defeat against Yasodharman at Malwa, Alkhan power is understood to have subsequently returned to the Gandhara and the Kāpiśī valleys, thereby having to confront the Nezaks. Whether this encounter was mostly peaceful or hostile is currently unknown, but has been recorded in part among numismatic evidence, from Alkhan coins minted in Gandhara with the characteristic Nezak bull-headed crown over an otherwise typically Alkhan design, to the overstriking of Nezak coins in the second half of the 6th century by the Alkhan ruler Toramana II. At around the same period, the Sasanians under Khusro I (r. 531-579) briefly reestablished their control of Balkh, and probably also Zabulistan, which is supported by a Sasanian administrative seal found there from the same period. Succeeding Sasanian control of Zabulistan by the end of the 6th-century, a new group of coins are struck with an š-mint (Zabol) brand and in a design reminiscent of both Alkhan and Nezak coinage, though ultimately missing the bull-headed crown of the Nezaks and struck with the Alkhan tamga, while the Nezak ā-coinage is retained in Kāpiśī. This new issue is known as the Alkhan-Nezak Crossover, and which dynasty continued to issue coinage from the Ghazni-mint until the middle of the 7th century.

==== The Rutbils and the Kabul Shahis ====
The region of southern Afghanistan was first invaded by Muslim Arabs from Zaranj in what is now Nimruz Province. From there they marched toward Bost, Kandahar, Zabulistan, and reached Kabul. In 683 Kabul revolted and defeated the Muslim army.

According André Wink:

"In southern and eastern Afghanistan, the regions of Zamindawar (Zamin I Datbar or land of the justice giver, the classical Archosia) and Zabulistan or Zabul (Jabala, Kapisha, Kia pi shi) and Kabul, the Arabs were effectively opposed for more than two centuries, from 643 to 870 AD, by the indigenous rulers the Zunbils and the related Kabul-Shahs of the dynasty which became known as the Buddhist-Shahi. With Makran and Baluchistan and much of Sindh this area can be reckoned to belong to the cultural and political frontier zone between India and Persia. It is clear however that in the seventh to the ninth centuries the Zunbils and their kinsmen the Kabulshahs ruled over a predominantly Indian rather than a Persian realm. The Arab geographers, in effect commonly speak of that king of "Al Hind" ...(who) bore the title of Zunbil."

According to C. E. Bosword:

"One of the most important aspects of the early Saffarid policy of significance for the spread of Islam in Afghanistan and on the borders of India long after their empire had collapsed, was that of expansion into eastern Afghanistan. The early Arab governors of Sistan had at times penetrated as far as Ghazana and Kabul, but these had been little more than slave and plunder raids. There was a fierce resistance from the local rulers of these regions, above all from the line of Zunbils who ruled in Zamindavar and Zabulistan and who were probably epigoni of the southern Hepthalite or Chionite kingdom of Zabul; on more than one occasion, these Zunbils inflicted sharp defeats on the Muslims. The Zunbils were linked with the Kabul-Shahs of the Shahi dynasty; the whole river valley was at this time culturally and religiously an outpost of the Indian world, as of course it had been in the earlier centuries during the heyday of the Buddhist Gandhara civilization."

The Kabul Shahis are generally split up into two eras: the Buddhist Shahis and the Hindu Shahis, with the change-over thought to have occurred sometime around 870 CE. The kingdom was known as the Kabul Shahan or Ratbelshahan from 565 CE to 670 CE, when the capitals were located in Kapisa and Kabul, and later Udabhandapura, also known as Hund, for its new capital. (Note: Keay 2000, p. 203: The Hindu Shahis, and in the late ninth century great was [their fame] ... in 870 Kabul itself was captured [lost] ... But in the Panjab they consolidated their kingdom and established a new capital first at Hund.) The kingdoms of Kapisa-Gandhara in modern-day Afghanistan, Zabulistan and Sindh (which then held Makran) in modern-day Pakistan, all of which were culturally and politically part of ancient India since ancient times, were known as "The Frontier of Al Hind".

==== Saffarid invasion and the Ghaznavids ====
"We are told that it was only in 870 AD that Zabulistan was finally conquered by one Yakub who was the virtual ruler of the neighbouring Iranian province of Siestan. The king was killed and his subjects were made Muslims."

The Hindu Shahis under Jayapala, is known for his struggles in defending his kingdom against the Ghaznavids for the control over Zabulistan and the surrounding region. Jayapala saw a danger in the consolidation of the Ghaznavids and invaded their capital city of Ghazni both in the reign of Sebuktigin and in that of his son Mahmud, which initiated the Muslim Ghaznavid and Hindu Shahi struggles. Sebuk Tigin, however, defeated him, and he was forced to pay an indemnity. Jayapala defaulted on the payment and took to the battlefield once more. Jayapala, however, lost control of the entire region from Zabulistan to between the Kabul Valley and Indus River.

However, Jayapala's army was hopeless in battle against the Ghaznavid forces, particularly against the young Mahmud of Ghazni. In the year 1001, soon after Sultan Mahmud came to power and was occupied with the Qarakhanids north of the Hindu Kush, Jayapala attacked Ghazni once more and upon suffering yet another defeat by the powerful Ghaznavid forces, near present-day Peshawar. After the Battle of Peshawar, he committed suicide because his subjects thought he had brought disaster and disgrace to the Shahis. Jayapala was succeeded by his son Anandapala, who along with other succeeding generations of the Shahis took part in various unsuccessful campaigns against the advancing Ghaznavids but were unsuccessful. These Ghaznavid victories in these wars resulted in the Islamization of Zabulistan and the surrounding regions.

=== Archeological sites ===
Zabol is home to several important archeological sites. The Burnt City (Shahr-e Sokhteh) is an ancient urban site in the region established in 3200 BCE, covering 151 hectares and built on a promonotory between Hamun Lake and the Helmand River. It was established by migrants from various surrounding regions. Two major fires occurred between 3200 BCE and 2750 BCE. It is from here the city derives its name from. Qaleh Now (meaning "New Castle") is another site, consisting of a Qajar-era village that is 160 years old with ancient archeological sites found within the village. The region of Zabulish is also replete with old ancient windmills, found on the outskirts of Zahedan, showcasing the engineering talent of the ancient Persians, a crucial piece of technology created to meet the region's agricultural needs. A national heritage site, Machi Castle, is also found in the Zabol region.

== Religion ==
=== Buddhist period ===
During Buddhist period Zabulistan is known to have been a place of various religious cults and practices, with Ghazni being an old stop on the silk and spice trade flowing between Tokharistan and Afghanistan. Chinese monk Xuanzang recorded numerous Buddhist stupas and monasteries supposedly built by Ashoka and several dozen Hindu temples, which were demolished by Islamic invaders around 653/54 CE. Xuanzang also made an account of Zabul (which he called by its Sanskrit name Jaguda), which he describes as animists and adherants of Mahayana Buddhism, which although in the minority had the support of its royals. In terms of other cults, the god Śuna, is described to be the prime deity of the country.

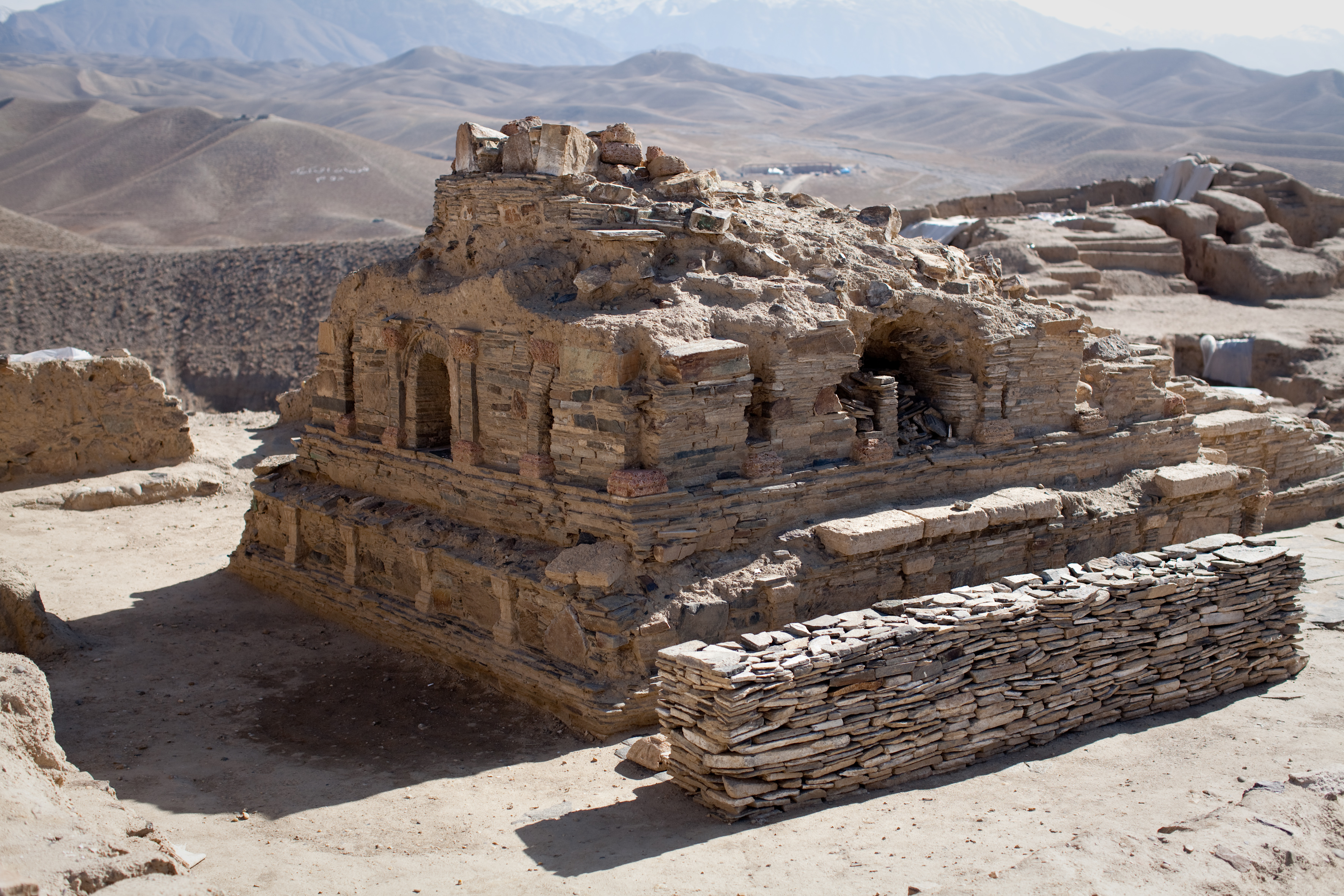
Newly excavated Buddhist stupa at Mes Aynak in Logar Province. Similar stupas have been discovered in neighboring Ghazni Province, including in the northern Samangan Province.

Although they worship various gods, they respect the Triple Gem. There are several hundred monasteries with more than ten thousand monks, all of whom study Mahayana teachings. The reigning king is a man of pure faith who inherited a throne handed down through many generations. He has engaged himself in performing meritorious deeds and is intelligent and studious. There are more than ten stupas built by king Asoka. Deva-temples number several tens, and the heretics, who are in the majority, live together. Their disciples are extremely numerous, and they worship the god Śuna.

- Xuanzang, The Great Tang Records on the Western Regions, 644 CE

=== Zhun ===
He goes on to describe the god as residing on top of a mountain in Zabul called the Śunāsīra mountain, where people came "from far and near and high and low", even attracting kings, ministers, officials and common people of regions where different customs were observed, to pay homage and make donations.

They either offer gold, silver, and rare gems or present sheep, horses, and other domestic animals to the god in competition with each other to show their piety and sincerity. Therefore, gold and silver are scattered all over the ground, and sheep and horses fill up the valley. Nobody dares to covet them, for everyone is eager to make offerings to the god. To those who respect and serve the heretics and practice asceticism whole-heartedly, the god imparts magical incantations, of which the heretics make effective use in most cases; for the treatment of disease, they are quite efficacious.

- Xuanzang, 644 CE

The god Śuna is again mentioned in Islamic sources in the recounting of the Saffarid conquest of Zabulistan, in the Arabic rendering Zūn (Arabic: زون). These sources mention two temples, one at Zamindawar and one at Sakkawand. The temple at Sakkawand was sacked and plundered in 870 CE.

"It is related that, Amru Lais conferred the governorship of Zabulistan on Fardghan and sent him there at the head of four thousand horses. There was a large place of worship of the God Zhun in the country, which was called Sakawand, and people used to come on pilgrimage to the Idols of that place. When Fardaghan arrived in Zabulistan he led his army against it, took the temples broke the idols in pieces, and overthrew the idolators. Some of the plunder he distributed among the troops, the rest he sent to Amru Lais."

"Fardaghan, the governor of Zabulistan region around Ghazni under Amr ibn Layth, plundered Sakawand, a place of pilgrimage to God Zhun, which was within the kingdom of the Shahis."

"The activities of the Saffarid brothers on the Indian frontier attracted special attention in the Caliphate thanks to the care they took to send exotic presents from the plunder to the Abbasid court. Yaqub, for instance, at one time sent fifty gold and silver idols from Kabul to the caliph Al-Mutamid who dispatched them to Mecca. Another set of Idols lavishly decorated with jewels and silver, sent by him, Amr in 896 from Sakawand (a place in the Logar valley between Ghazni and Kabul which the sources describe as a pilgrimage centre dedicated to God Zhun), caused a sensation in Baghdad on account of their strangeness."

=== Sakawand a pilgrimage centre ===
Sakawand was a major centre of Hindu pilgrimage.

"It is related that, Amru Lais conferred the governorship of Zabulistan on Fardghan and sent him there at the head of four thousand horses. There was a large place of worship of the God Zhun in the country, which was called Sakawand, and people used to come on pilgrimage to the Idols of that place. When Fardaghan arrived in Zabulistan he led his army against it, took the temples broke the idols in pieces, and overthrew the idolators. Some of the plunder he distributed among the troops, the rest he sent to Amru Lais."

== See also ==
- Zabul Province
- Zabol
- Zunbils
- Abu Ali Lawik
- Sajawand
- Zamindawar

== Bibliography ==
- "15. The Rutbils of Zabulistan and the "Emperor of Rome" | Digitaler Ausstellungskatalog", pro.geo.univie.ac.at, archived from the original on 2 August 2017
- "6. ALKHAN: From the Anonymous Clan-rulers to King Khingila | Digitaler Ausstellungskatalog". pro.geo.univie.ac.at. Archived from the original on 14 June 2018.
- "9. Toramana and Mihirakula - The Rise and Fall of the Alkhan in India | Digitaler Ausstellungskatalog". pro.geo.univie.ac.at. Archived from the original on 1 November 2019.
- "Ameer Nasir-ood-deen Subooktugeen", Ferishta, History of the Rise of Mohammedan Power in India, Volume 1: Section 15, Packard Humanities Institute, archived from the original on 29 October 2013
- Bosworth, C. E. (1975), "The Tāhirids and Ṣafārids", in Frye, R. N. (ed.), The Cambridge History of Iran, vol. 4, Cambridge University Press, pp. 90–135, ISBN 978-0-521-20093-6
- "Definition of jāguḍa", sanskritdictionary.com, n.d.
- Elliot, Sir Henry Miers (1953). The History of India. Trübner and Co. p. 20. "There was a large Hindu place of worship in that country, which was called Sakawand, and people used to come on pilgrimage from the most remote parts of Hindustan to the idols of that place. When Fardaghan arrived in Zabulistan he led bis army against it, took the temple, broke the idols in pieces, and overthrew the idolaters. Some of the plunder he distributed among the troops, the rest he sent to Amru Lais, informing him of the conquest, and asking for reinforcements."
- ḠAZNĪ – Encyclopaedia Iranica, 3 February 2012
- The Gupta Empire and India (320 AD – 750AD), n.d., archived from the original on 21 November 2008
- Holt, P. M.; Lambton, Ann K. S.; Lewis, Bernard, eds. (1977), The Cambridge history of Islam, Cambridge University Press, p. 3, ISBN 978-0-521-29137-8, "Jaypala of Waihind saw danger in the consolidation of the kingdom of Ghazni and decided to destroy it. He, therefore, invaded Ghazni, but was defeated"
- Keay, John (2000). India: A History. Grove Press. ISBN 978-0-8021-3797-5.
- Leyden, John; Erskine, William, eds. (1921). "Events Of The Year 910 (1525)". Memoirs of Babur. Packard Humanities Institute. p. 8. Archived from the original on 13 November 2007.
- Li, Rongxi (1995), The Great Tang Dynasty Record of the Western Regions, Berkeley, California: Numata Center for Buddhist Translation and Research, ISBN 1-886439-02-8
- Majumdar, R. C., ed. (1964), The History and Culture of the Indian People: The Age of Imperial Kanauj, Bharatiya Vidya Bhavan
- Minorsky, V. (1937), Ḥudūd al-ʿĀlam (The Regions of the World), Great Britain: The E. J. W. Gibb Memorial Trust – via Internet Archive
  - Minorsky, V. (2015), Ḥudūd al-ʿĀlam (The Regions of the World), Great Britain: The E. J. W. Gibb Memorial Trust, ISBN 978-0-906094-03-7
- Mishra, Yogendra (1972). The Hindu Sahis of Afghanistan and the Punjab, A.D. 865-1026: a phase of Islamic advance into India. Vaishali Bhavan. pp. 42–43. "When Fardaghan arrived in Zabulistan, he led his army against Sakawand, a large Hindu place of worship in that country with a temple and many idols. He took the temple, broke the idols into pieces, and overthrew the idolaters. He informed Amr ibn Lais of the conquest and asked for reinforcements. When the news of the fall of Sakawand reached Kamalu, who was Rai of Hindustan, he collected an innumerable army and marched towards Zabulistan to- take revenge."
- Morgenstierne, Georg (2003). A New Etymological Vocabulary of Pashto. Wiesbaden, Germany: Reichert Verlag. ISBN 978-389500364-6.
- Mustawfi, Hamd-allah (1919), The Geographical Part Of The Nuzhat-al-qulub – via Internet Archive
- Rezakhani, Khodadad (2017), Reorienting the Sasanians: East Iran in Late Antiquity, Edinburgh University Press, ISBN 978-1-4744-0030-5
- Vondrovec, Klaus (2014), Coinage of the Iranian Huns and Their Successors from Bactria to Gandhara: 4th to 8th Century ce, Vienna: Verlag der Österreichischen Akademie der Wissenschaften, ISBN 978-370017695-4
- Wink, André (1996) [first published 1990], Al-Hind: The Making of the Indo-Islamic World, Vol 1: Early Medieval India and the Expansion of Islam, 7th-11th Centuries (Third ed.), Brill, ISBN 039104173-8
  - Wink, André (2002), Al-Hind, Vol. 1: Early Medieval India and the Expansion of Islam, 7th-11th Centuries, BRILL, ISBN 0-391-04173-8
