= Logar River =

River in Afghanistan

- Place of Joining with Kabul River

Location
- Country: Afghanistan
- Cities: Maidan Shahr, Puli Alam, Kabul

Physical characteristics
- Source: Baba Mountain
  - location: Maidan Wardak Province
  - coordinates: 34.45°N 68.44°E
  - elevation: 2,400 m (7,900 ft)
- Mouth: Kabul River
  - location: Kabul
  - coordinates: 34°32′20″N 69°17′40″E
- Length: 64 km (40 mi)
- Basin size: 1,216 km^{2} (470 sq mi)

Basin features
- Progression: Kabul→ Indus→ Arabian Sea
- Tributaries
  - left: Ghazni River

The Logar River (Pashto: د لوګر سیند) (also Lowgar) is a river of Afghanistan. It gives the name to the Logar Valley and Logar Province. In Maidan Wardak Province where the river originates, it is called Chak River. The Chaki Wardak Dam is built on the river in Chaki Wardak District, Maidan Wardak Province.

The Logar River drains a wide tract of country, rising in Maidan Wardak Province on the southern slopes of the Sanglakh Range and receiving tributaries from hills in the Kharwar District, north-east of Ghazni. It joins the Kabul River a few kilometres below the city of Kabul. The fertile and well irrigated Logar Valley, which is watered by the Logar's southern tributaries, is about 64 km (40 mi) long and 19 km (12 mi) wide. Lying in the vicinity of the capital, the district contributes significantly to its food supply.
