= Kharwar District =

District of Logar, Afghanistan

- District
- Afghan soldiers and policemen provide security from a hill overlooking Kharwar district's Balukhel village
- Interactive map of Kharwar District
- Country: Afghanistan
- Province: Logar Province
- Time zone: UTC+4:30 (D† (Afghanistan Standard Time))

Kharwar District (Pashto: خروار ولسوالۍ), also known as Kharvar, Khawrakay, Karfir Kowt, and Kefir Kot, is a district of Logar Province, Afghanistan. It was created from Charkh District.

The district is named after the village of Kharwar (Khawrakay), which is about 56 miles (90 kilometers) south of Kabul and about 40 kilometers northeast of Ghazni.

== History ==
In July 2008 a U.S. helicopter was shot down by small arms fire, an American officer said he was worried about the rising violence in the area.

In 2009 a United States Army combat outpost was set up in the district by Cherokee Troop 3-71 CAV 3BCT 10th Mountain Division (LI).

In 2013, a United States Army combat outpost was set up in the district by Chosin Company 3-7 INF, 4IBCT, 3rd ID to assist FOB Shank with QRF.

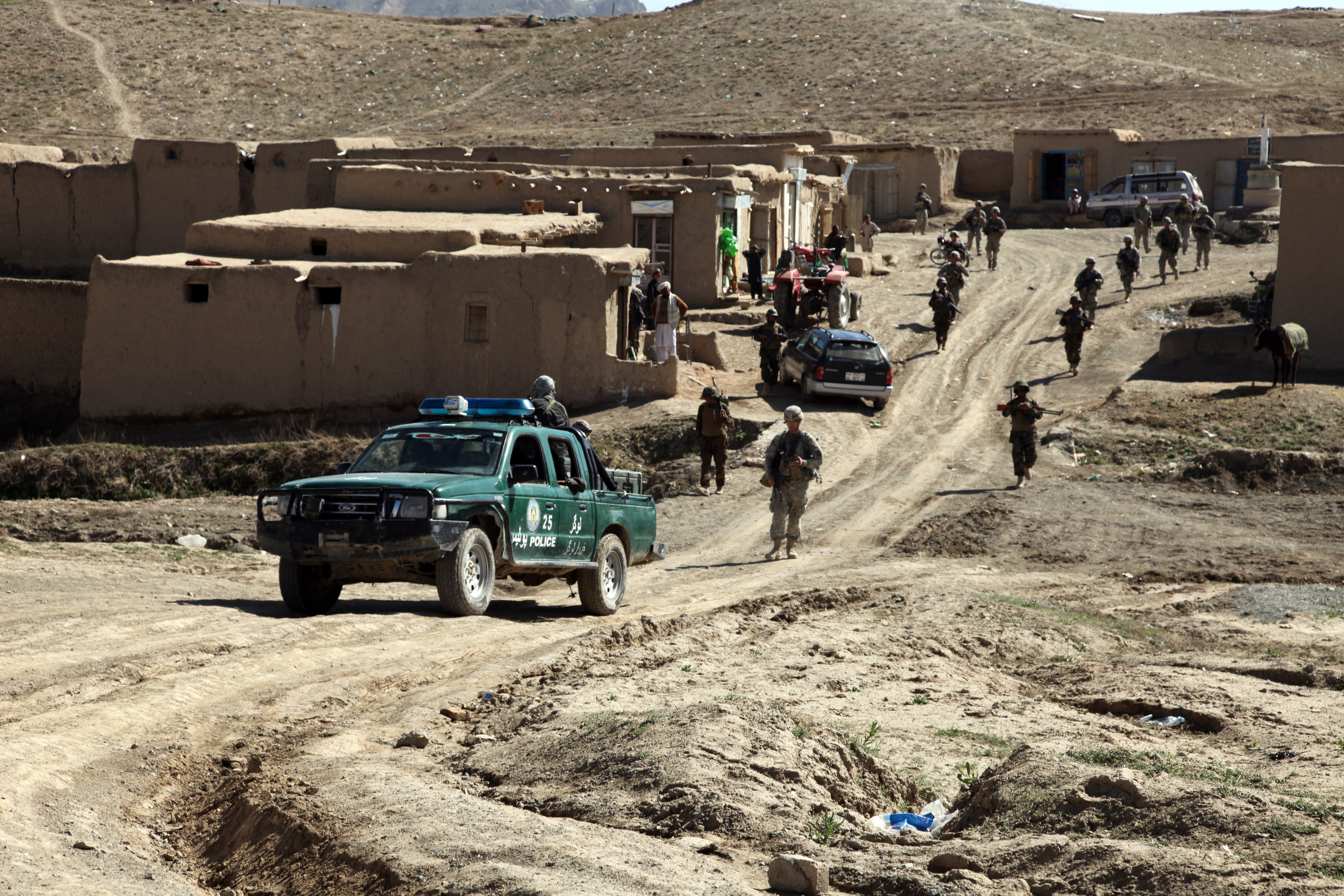
Afghan National Police patrol through a bazaar while on their way into the village of Bakshikhala, Kherwar District, Logar Province

== Kafir Kot - Archaeological remains ==
Near the village are a series of archaeological remains known as Kafir Kot (not to be confused with Kafir Kot in Dera Ismail Khan District of Khyber Pakhtunkhwa, Pakistan). These are believed to date from the Kushano-Sassanian period (3rd-7th century AD).

Warwick Ball described Kharwar as "an extensive plain c. 40 km northeast of Ghazni on the route to Charkh-i Logar. Description: ruins of a large town, where many coins have been found." Dr. S M Raheen, the Afghan Minister of Culture and Information has said that "Kharwar is possibly more beautiful than Mes Aynak, almost the same age. Unfortunately looting is going on there, but no one pays any attention … I don't know why everybody cares just about Mes Aynak."

The site is very large — approximately 19 square miles centered on the given coordinates, but never scientifically excavated, so its true size remains unknown— comprising a number of sites and ruins of an immense Buddhist monastery complex or city, where a fortified gate, many stupas, statues and coins have been found.

The site has been looted nearly continuously by locals and organized teams for the past several years. An Italian archaeological team was allowed to visit the site for one day in September, 2003.

All efforts should be made to halt the looting of this site, which archeologists term "the Pompeii of the Buddhist world": meaning a site that was essentially frozen in time, abandoned when the first Muslim armies reached this part of Central Asia during the 8th or 9th century.

Warwick Ball (in Archaeological Gazetteer of Afghanistan, nr 565) located a portion of Kharwar (or Khurwar) at latitude 34º43'N, longitude 68º52'E.

World City Database locates Kharwar at Lat. 33.74, long. 68.8958333
