= Logar Province =

Province of Afghanistan

Logar لوگر
- Province
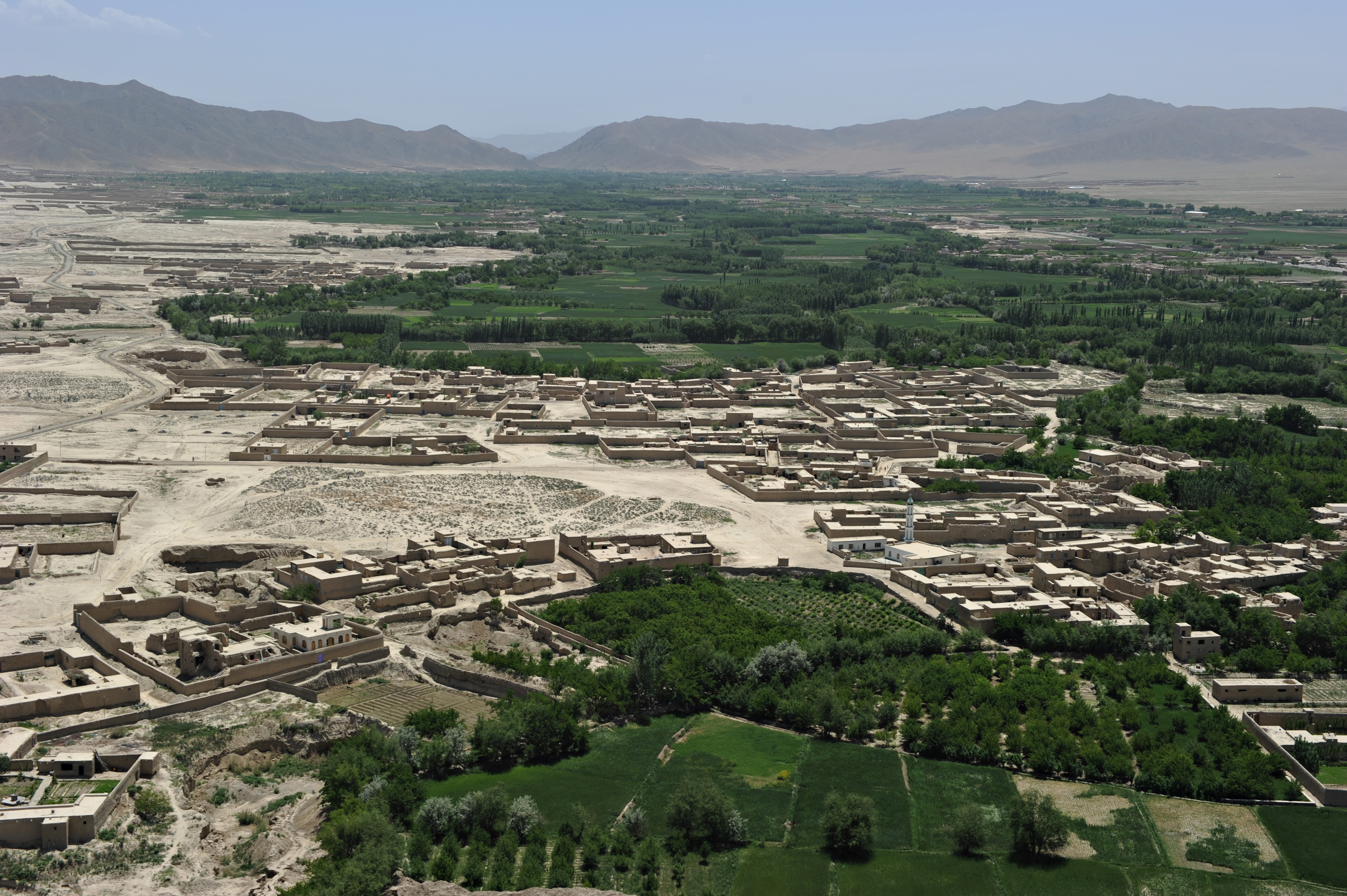
- Aerial view of Mohammad Agha District in Logar province

- Map of Afghanistan with Logar highlighted
- Coordinates (Capital): 34.0°N 69.2°E
- Country: Afghanistan
- Capital: Puli Alam

Government
  - Governor: Maulvi Inayatullah
  - Deputy Governor: Maulvi Inamullah Salahuddin
  - Police Chief: Mohammaduddin Shah Mukhtab

Area
  - Total: 4,568 km^{2} (1,764 sq mi)

Population (2021)
  - Total: 442,037
  - Density: 96.77/km^{2} (250.6/sq mi)
- Time zone: UTC+4:30 (AFT)
- Postal code: 14xx
- ISO 3166 code: AF-LOG
- Main languages: Dari; Pashto

Logar (Note: Pashto: لوگر, romanized: Logar, pronounced [loˈgaɾ]; Dari: لوگر, romanized: Lōgar, pronounced [loːˈgáɾ]) is one of the 34 provinces of Afghanistan, located in the eastern section of the country. It is divided into 7 districts and contains hundreds of villages. Puli Alam is the capital of the province. As of 2021, Logar has a population of approximately 442,037 people, most of whom are ethnic Pashtuns and Tajiks.

The Logar River enters the province through the west and leaves to the north.

== History ==
A 2,600-year-old Zoroastrian fire temple was found at Mes Aynak (about 25 miles or 40 kilometers southeast of Kabul). Several Buddhist stupas and more than 1,000 statues were also found. Smelting workshops, miners’ quarters (even then the site's copper was well known), a mint, two small forts, a citadel, and a stockpile of Kushan, Sassanian and Indo-Parthian coins were also found at the site.

=== Recent history ===
During the Soviet–Afghan War, Logar was known among some Afghans as the Bab al-Jihad (Gates of Jihad) because it became a fierce theatre of war between US-backed/trained mujahideen groups and the Soviet-backed Afghan government troops. The Ahmadzai Pashtuns and Stanikzai Pashtuns is dominant in this region. Haji Shuja, Haji Zareen and Haji Bahadur were the prominent traders and chieftains in the region before the soviet invasion of Afghanistan. It was one of the main supply routes of mujahideen rebels coming from Pakistan. Like other parts of the country, Logar has also seen heavy fighting since the Soviets started a crackdown against the elders of the Ahmadzai tribe and Stanikzai tribe during the 1980s. Swedish journalist Borge Almqvist, who visited the province in 1982, wrote that: "Everywhere in the Logar province the most common sight except for ruins are graves". Soviet operations included using bombing, the use of flammable liquids to burn alive people in hiding, poisoning of drinking water, and destruction of crops and farmland. One writer who witnessed the events argues that the Soviet actions in Logar amounted to genocide.

By 1995, the province had fallen to the Taliban government. During the presidency of Hamid Karzai, the International Security Assistance Force (ISAF) and Afghan National Security Forces (ANSF) gradually took over the security of the area. The Provincial Reconstruction Team Logar (PRT Logar) was established in March 2008. It provided several benefits to the locals, including security, development, and jobs.

On 19 August 2014, a major Taliban offensive took place with 700 insurgents aiming to take control of the province, while the NATO-led foreign force mistakenly killed three civilians in an airstrike in December 2014.

On 20 January 2019, the Taliban claimed responsibility for a car bomb attack on the province's governor and his convoy, which killed eight security forces and wounded at least 10 on the highway to Kabul. The governor and the provincial head of the National Directorate of Security were uninjured.

On 14 August 2021, the Taliban offensive reached Puli Alam (the province capital), and the province of Logar fell to the Taliban, setting their sights on Kabul the following day.

== Geography ==
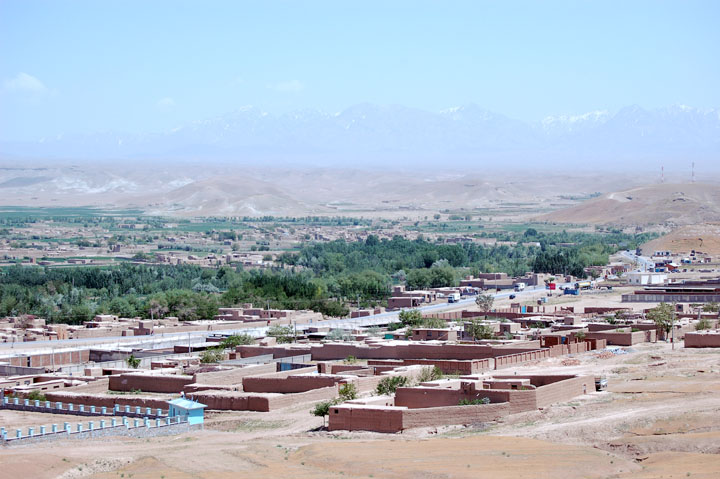
Puli Alam, the capital of Logar province.

Logar can be generally described as a relatively flat river valley in the north and central regions, surrounded by rugged mountains to the east, south, and southwest. The district of Azra, in the east, consists almost entirely of mountains, while travel to the Paktia Province to the south is limited to the Tera Pass, a 2896 m high road that was recently completed as part of the international reconstruction effort in Afghanistan. The Kabul-Khost Highway runs north–south through Logar Province, from the Mohammed Agha District.

The government of Afghanistan officially recognizes all the districts of the Logar province as part of the province.

Puli Alam, which is located in the district of Puli Alam, serves as the capital of Logar province. It is connected by a highway to Kabul in the north and Gardez to the southeast.

The highway to Kabul was completed in 2006. Additional projects include numerous schools, radio stations, government facilities, and a major Afghan National Police base situated south of the city.

Like many Afghan cities, there is municipal planning and services. During the tenure of President Ashraf Ghani the city gained electricity, clean drinking and water facilities.

== Administrative divisions ==
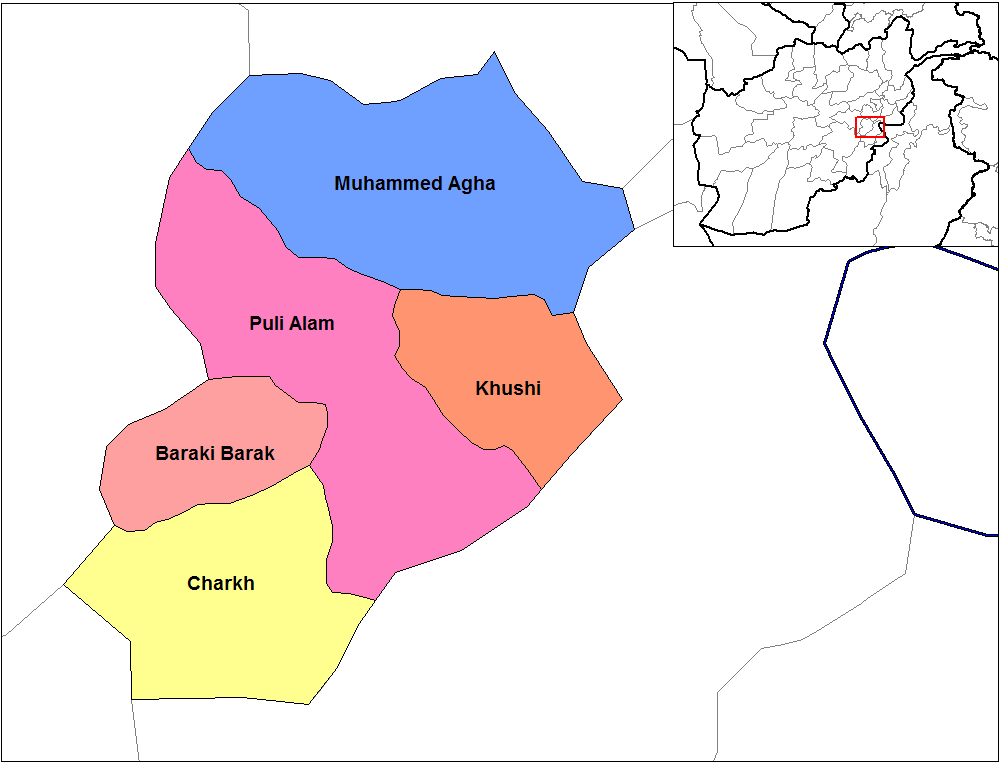
Map of the districts of Logar as of January 2004, prior to the redrawing of provincial and district boundaries later that year

Until 2005 the district was administratively subdivided into five districts. In that year the province gained Azra District from neighboring Paktia Province; also part of Charkh District was split off into the new district of Kharwar.

Districts of Logar province
District	Capital	Population (2021)	Area	Pop. density	Ethnicity	Notes
Azra		22,985	777	30	100% Pashtuns.	Officially recognized by the Afghan government as a district of Logar province.
Baraki Barak		99,210	239	416	100% Tajik.	Includes the road linking Puli Alam with Highway 1 to the west. Recognised as a vital commerce district.
Charkh		50,220	304	165	Predominately Tajiks.	Officially recognized by the Afghan government as a district of Logar province.
Kharwar		29,628	469	63	Predominately Pashtun .	Officially recognized by the Afghan government as a district of Logar province. Used to belong to Charkh District
Khoshi		27,236	398	69	Predominately Tajiks .	Home to the minority Shiite of Logar.
Mohammad Agha		85,295	1,076	79	60% Pashtuns and 40% Tajik.	The northern portion of Mohammad Agha is contiguous with the southern 'suburbs' of Kabul.
Puli Alam	Puli Alam	119,800	1,131	106	Mix of Tajiks, Pashtuns, and Hazaras.	The Capital
Logar		434,374	4,568	95	Majority Tajik, minority of Pashtun and Hazara	

== Economy ==
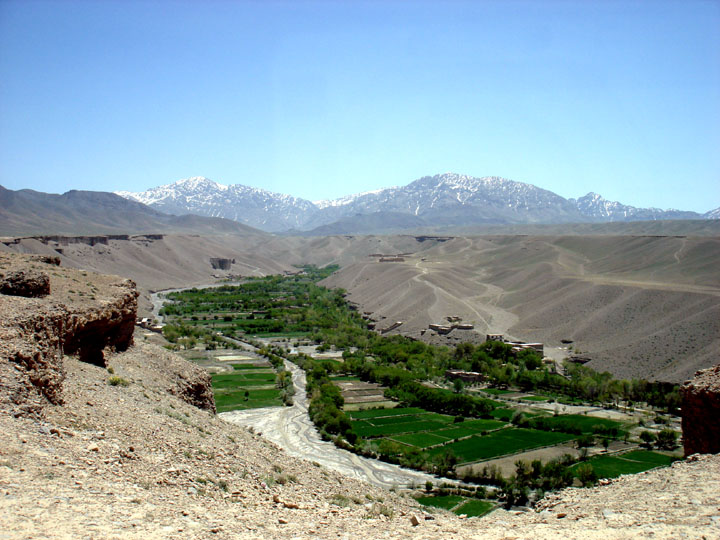
The main river valley in the Khoshi District of Logar province. Extensive irrigation and canal works, known as karez, provide water for the majority of the agriculture in southeastern Afghanistan.

Logar is an agricultural province with a wealth of minerals such as copper and chromite. Many residents of the province are engaged in the agriculture and transport business. In terms of industry, the province has one textile and one copper factory. Agriculture, commerce and services, and livestock products account for the majority of commercial operations. Agriculture is a significant source of income for 31% of households. However, commerce and services provide income to 30% of rural households, while non-farm-related labor provides income to 46% of rural households. Tobacco and sugar extract are the two most important industrial crops. The main industry is honey production, which is a small industry. Jewelry, ceramics, and carpets are made in a small number of settlements. Eighty-four percent of the province's households have access to irrigated land. Wheat, maize, potatoes, alfalfa, clover, and other feed are among the most significant field crops. Sheep, cattle, camels, and poultry are the most frequent livestock.

== Demographics ==
=== Population ===
In 2008, the population of Logar was estimated to be at 349,000 people. The province has 44,209 households, with an average of eight individuals per home. Rural districts are home to 72 percent of the population.

=== Ethnicity, languages and religion ===
Pashto is spoken by two-thirds of villages and 60% of the population, whereas Dari is spoken by one-third of villages and 40% of the people. The Kochi people (nomads) also live in Logar, and their numbers fluctuate with the seasons. In the winter, 96,280 or 4% of them stay in Logar and live in 29 settlements. During the summer, the Kochi's population increases to 208,339, making Logar the province with the second-highest number of Kochi people after neighboring Kabul province.

As of 2021, Logar has a population of approximately 442,037. It is a multi-ethnic tribal society, while about 60% of its residents are made up by Pashtuns, whereas the remainder are Tajiks and Hazaras. The Logar River enters the province through the west and leaves to the north. Pashtuns (Ahmadzai and Stanikzai tribes) are influential in the region.

Estimated ethnolinguistic and -religious composition
Ethnicity	Pashtun	Tajik/ Farsiwan	Hazara	Others	Sources
Period	Pashtun	Tajik/ Farsiwan	Hazara	Others	Sources

2004–2021 (Islamic Republic)	60 – 70%	≥30%	≤10%	∅
2020 EU	1st	2nd	3rd	–
2018 UN	70%	30%	–	–
2015 NPS	∅ (Note: incl. Kochi.)	∅	∅	∅
2011 PRT	60% (Note: excl. Kochi.)	40%		–
2011 USA	60%	40%		–
2009 ISW	60%	40%		–

Legend:
- ∅: Ethnicity mentioned in source but not quantified
- –: Ethnicity not mentioned specifically
- Source abbreviations: Empirical sources: –, Government sources: EU – European Union Agency for Asylum, PRT – Provincial Reconstruction Team of the United States government, UN – United Nations Assistance Mission in Afghanistan, Editorial sources: ISW – Institute for the Study of War, NPS – Naval Postgraduate School, USA – United States Army

=== Education ===
The overall literacy rate (6+ years of age) increased from 21% in 2005 to 30% in 2011. The overall net enrolment rate (6–13 years of age) increased from 22% in 2005 to 45% in 2011.

The overall literacy rate in Logar province was 21% in 2005 however, while nearly one-third (31%) of men are literate this is true for just under one-tenth (9%) of women. There are around 168 primary and secondary schools in the province catering for 81,538 students. There are nearly 2,082 teachers working in schools in the Logar province. There are several girls schools in the province, mostly located in Koshi and Pul-e-alam. Due to the large Taliban presence in Chark and Baraki Barak, the freedom of women in Logar does not always allow for an education. As of 2007, the province had a literacy rate of 17%.

There are 19 religious centers including a Dar-ul-Ulum, three Darul Hifaz and the rest are Madrasas.

Three technical and vocational high schools and two private high schools function in Logar Province.

=== Health ===
The percentage of households without clean drinking water fell from 45% in 2005 to 14% in 2011. The percentage of births attended to by a skilled birth attendant increased from 9% in 2005 to 73% in 2011.

In 2008, the province of Logar has 32 health clinics and a 137-bed hospital. According to data from 2008, the Ministry of Health employs 48 doctors and 218 other health professionals in the province. There are 156 pharmacies in the province. The majority of villages do not have a permanent health worker. To access their nearest health center, the majority of the populace must travel 5 to 10 kilometers.

== Culture ==
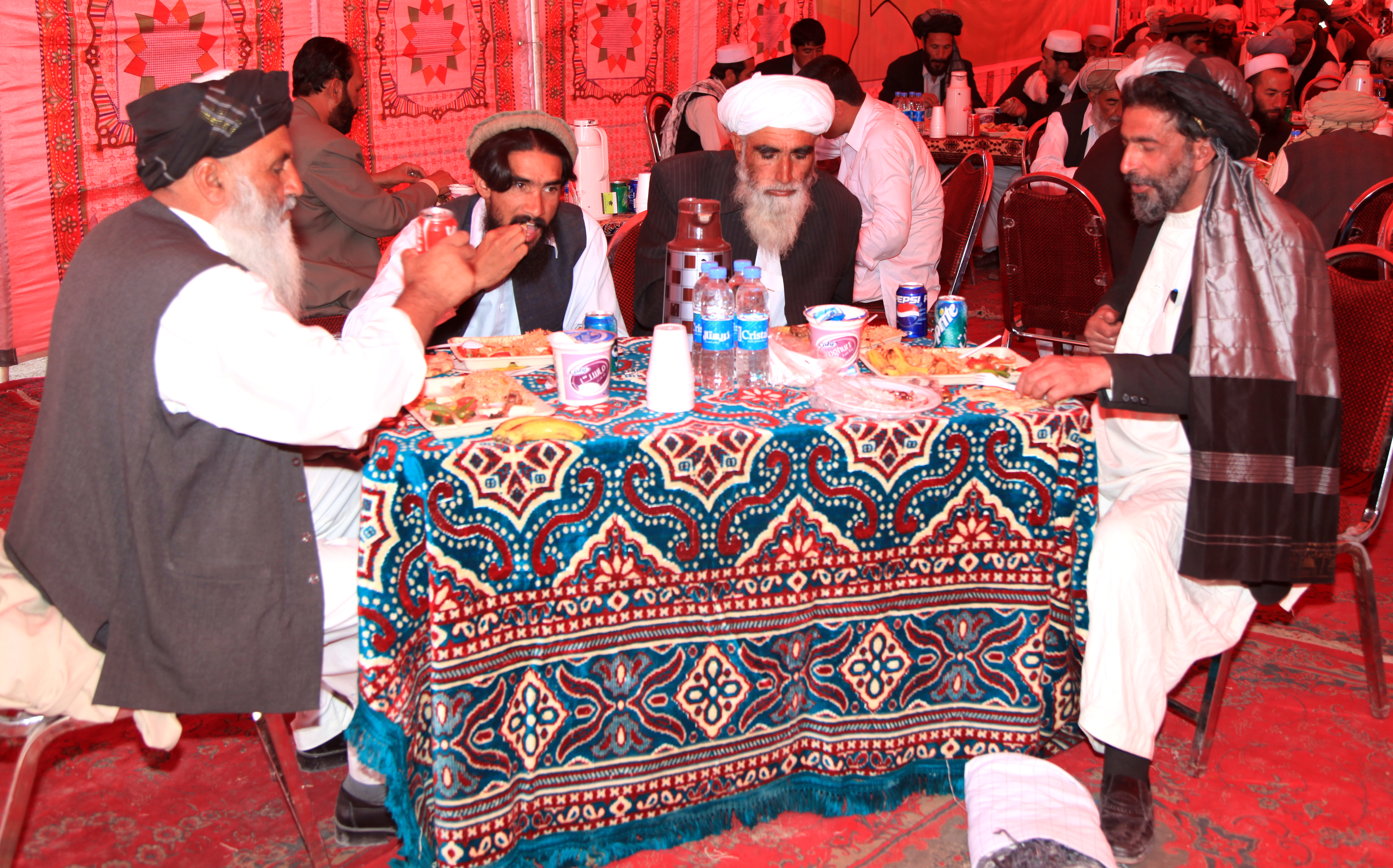
Logari men eating traditional Afghan food

=== Sport ===
Cricket is the most popular sport in the province. Logar has been a major supplier of players for the Afghanistan national cricket team. Former players include Dawlat Ahmadzai, Ahmad Shah Pakteen and former national team captain Raees Ahmadzai. Among the active national players hailing from Logar are: Mohammad Nabi (captain of the national team), Shahpoor Zadran, Hashmatullah Shahidi, Nasir Jamal Ahmadzai and Gulbadin Naib Ahmadzai.

Football is the second most popular sport in the province. De Abasin Sape (meaning "Waves of Abasin") plays in the Afghanistan Premier League. Abasin means "father of the rivers" in Pashto and refers to the Indus River. The team represents the provinces of Khost, Paktia, Logar, and Paktika.

Other popular sports are volleyball, boxing, taekwondo, Washoe, kick boxing and wrestling.

== Notable people ==
- Sayed Abdul Ghafar Sayed Zadah, lieutenant general of the Afghan army
- Hashmatullah Shahidi, test captain of the Afghan Cricket Team
- Ashraf Ghani, Former president of Afghanistan

== See also ==
- Provinces of Afghanistan
- Mes Aynak – the world's second largest copper deposit
