= Munji =

Munji may refer to:

- Munji language, an Iranian language of the Pamirs
- Yidgha-Munji people, the people who speak the language
- Munji, Afghanistan, village in Badakhshan Province, Afghanistan
- Munji Downs, a homestead in Western Australia
- Titus Munji, a marathon runner from Kenya

== See also ==
- Munj (disambiguation)
- Munja (disambiguation)
- Munjya, a 2024 Indian horror film
