= Yidgha =

Yidgha may refer to:

- Yidgha language, a language spoken in Chitral, Pakistan
- Yidgha people, the people who speak the language
