= Sarghulami =

Extinct Iranian language

- Saraghlani
- lavz-e-mazor
- (spurious?)
- Native to: Afghanistan
- Region: Badakhshan Province (Panj river)
- Era: attested 1920s?
- Language family: Indo-European: Indo-Iranian; Iranian; Eastern Iranian; Munji-Yidgha; Sarghulami

Language codes
- ISO 639-3: None (mis)
- Glottolog: None

Sarghulami is a possible extinct Iranian language formerly spoken in the village of Sarghulam in Badakhshan, Afghanistan. It was recorded by Russian professor Ivan Zarubin in the 1920s, though many linguists doubt that the language even existed. Zarubin said it was spoken in a valley east of Fayzabad and collected a few words, though it may be referring to the village of Sarghulam. It is thought to be part of the Munji-Yidgha branch of the Pamir language, though many Pashto words have been noted in the language.
