= Sebak =

Sebak may refer to:

- Sevayat, servitors of Jagannath, see Jagannath Temple, Puri
- Rick Sebak (born 1953), American television producer, writer and narrator
- Sobek, also spelled Sebak, ancient Egyptian deity
- Zebak District, Badakhshan Province, Afghanistan
  - Zebak, Afghanistan, capital of Zebak District
