= Yidgha-Munji people =

Dardic ethnic group of Pakistan and Afghanistan

Yidgha-Munji
یدغا-مونجی مردم

Regions with significant populations
- Pakistan: 9,600
- Afghanistan: 5,300

Languages
- Yidgha, Munji; Also Persian and Khowar

Religion
- Islam (Nizari Isma'ilism)

Related ethnic groups
- Wakhi, Shughni, other Pamiris

The Yidgha-Munji people (مردمې مونجی وې یدغا) also known as Mukhbani (مُخبانی) are the Iranian-Pamiri peoples inhabiting the Lotkoh Valley in Chitral (Khyber Pakhtunkhwa) and Kuran wa Munjan District in Badakhshan in both Pakistan and Afghanistan.

== History ==
Historically the Munji and the Yidgha were one group. 500 years ago, the Yidgha people fled Munjan Valley (in Afghanistan) to Chitral because of persecution by the Arghun dynasty which then had lost control of Chitral. The place where the Munjis originated was from the village of Munji, hence the name. Many Munji later fled to Pakistan during the War in Afghanistan as there were many killed during the American Invasion of Afghanistan.

== Lifestyle ==
The Yidgha are engaged in agriculture and livestock including potatoes, animals, and dry fruits. Many Yidgha speakers have married the Kho as well as Dari speakers. The literacy rate of the Yidgha is only three percent. The people visit Shekhani speakers in nearby Afghanistan's Hamadiwanababa in Nuristan Province where they trade.

The Munji people, the majority who now live in Pakistan, have intended to return to their homes in Afghanistan after the conflict ends. The Munji live a simple life and are primarily involved in trading with nearby communities like the Gawar (Gawar-Bati speakers) and the Parachi (Parachi speakers). Many Munji are said to have come earlier to Chitral, from Nasir Khusrow, who went to treat his sick wife.

== Languages ==
The Munji and Yidgha speak their respected language, Munji and Yidgha, which are both mutually intelligible with each other and belong to the Pamiri languages, a subgroup of the Eastern Iranian languages, which in turn is part of the Iranian languages. The languages have some dialectal differences with Yidgha borrowing more words from Khowar than Munji, with Munji rarely borrowing from Khowar and more from Nuristani languages like Kata-vari and Shekhani.
