= Sanglechi language =

Iranian language of Afghanistan and Tajikistan

Sanglechi
- Dargi
- Native to: Afghanistan, Tajikistan
- Native speakers: 2,200 (2009)
- Language family: Indo-European: Indo-Iranian; Iranian; Southeastern; Sanglechi–Ishkashimi; Sanglechi
- Writing system: None

Official status
- Recognised minority language in: Tajikistan (in Gorno-Badakhshan)

Language codes
- ISO 639-3: sgy
- Glottolog: sang1344
- Linguasphere: 58-ABD-db
- Sanglechi is classified as Severely Endangered by the UNESCO Atlas of the World's Languages in Danger

Sanglechi is a Pamiri language spoken in villages in the Zebak District of Afghanistan: Dashte Rubat, Eskatul, Faruq, Flaxmadek, Sar-Sanglech, and Takya. It is also spoken in Tajikistan, where it is called Sanglich. The name originates from the Sanglech Valley, in which many of the people live. The language is closely related to the Munji and Pashto languages of Afghanistan.
