= Munji, Afghanistan =

Munji
- Location in Afghanistan
- Coordinates: 36°49′51″N 70°32′39″E
- Country: Afghanistan
- Province: Badakhshan Province
- Time zone: + 4.30

Munji is a village in Kuran wa Munjan District, Badakhshan Province in north-eastern Afghanistan, where Munji people originate, who speak Munji which is closely related to Yidgha spoken in the Upper Lotkoh Valley of Chitral, west of Garam Chishma in Khyber Pakhtunkhwa, Pakistan.

== See also ==
- Badakhshan Province
