= Vanji language =

Extinct Iranian language of Bukharan Emirate

Vanji
- Old Wanji
- w/vanǰi, vanǰiwor(í), vanǰivor
- Native to: Bukharan Emirate
- Region: Vanj river valley
- Extinct: late 19th century
- Language family: Indo-European: Indo-Iranian; Iranian; Southeastern Iranian; Shughni-Yazghulami-Munji; Shughni-Yazghulami; Yazghulami-Vanji?; Vanji
- Writing system: Unwritten

Language codes
- ISO 639-3: None (mis)
- Glottolog: oldw1238

The Vanji language, also spelt Vanchi and Vanži (Vanji: vanǰivor) is an extinct Iranian language, one of the areal group of Iranian languages. It was spoken in the Vanj River valley in what is now the Gorno-Badakhshan Autonomous Region of Tajikistan. There are only 64 known words.

In the 19th century the region was forcibly annexed to the Bukharan Emirate and a campaign of violent assimilation undertaken, and by the end of the 19th century, the Vanji language had completely disappeared, displaced by Tajik Persian as a result of assimilation. The local dialect of Tajik Persian spoken in Vanj has some Vanji influence.

== Documentation ==
The Russian linguist Ivan Ivanovich Zarubin was the first to assess the language in the early 20th century, by which time it was already extinct. Zarubin was able to collect only words and phrases recalled by older inhabitants of the region as having been spoken by their grandparents who still knew something of the language, and he considered it one of the Pamir languages.

== Phonology ==
The language as reconstructed had a phonology consisting of the stop consonants p, b, t, d, k, g and q, the fricative consonants f, v, θ, ð, s, z, ʃ, ʒ, x, ɣ, χ, ʁ and h, the affricate consonants t͡ʃ and d͡ʒ and the sonorants m, w, n, r, l, j and ŋ as well as the vowels a, e, ẹ, i, ə, o, ü and u.

	Bilabial	Labiodental	Dental	Alveolar	Postalveolar	Palatal	Velar	Uvular	Glottal
Plosive	p b		t d				k ɡ	q	
Affricate				(t͡s) (d͡z)	t͡ʃ d͡ʒ				
Fricative		f v	θ ð	s z	ʃ ʒ		x ɣ	χ ʁ	h
Nasal	m			n			(ŋ)		
Approximant	w			l		j			
Trill				r					

== Grammar ==
Much less can be discerned about the grammar of Vanji: there were probably two genders, masculine and feminine, with plurals of nouns formed by adding a suffix -ev, comparative forms of adjectives by adding -tar and Infinitives of verbs were formed by adding -ak.
