= Ab Daw =

Village in Badakhshan Province, Afghanistan

Ab Daw Āb Daw
- Location in Afghanistan
- Coordinates: 36°15′N 71°10′E
- Country: Afghanistan
- Province: Badakhshan Province
- District: Wurduj
- Time zone: UTC+4:30 (Afghanistan Time)

Ab Daw is a village in Badakhshan Province, Afghanistan, about 16 miles (26 km) northwest of Zebak. Historically, the majority of its inhabitants have been Tajiks.
