= Munj =

Munj or Mownj (Persian: مونج) may refer to:

- Munj, Fars
- Munj, Kohgiluyeh and Boyer-Ahmad
- Munj, Mazandaran
- Vakpati Munja, a 10th-century Indian king; also known as Munj in Hindi

== See also ==
- Monj (disambiguation)
- Munja (disambiguation)
- Munji (disambiguation)
- Munjya, a 2024 Indian horror film
