= HGB =

HGB may refer to:

- Hamilton, Grimsby and Beamsville Electric Railway, or HG&B, a defunct Canadian interurban railway company
- Handelsgesetzbuch, the German Commercial Code
- Hellogoodbye, an American power pop band
- Hemoglobin
- Himalayan Geothermal Belt
- Hochschule für Grafik und Buchkunst Leipzig
- Hollywood Guaranty Building
- Greater Bay Airlines (ICAO: HGB), Hong Kong SAR
