= Monj =

Monj may refer to:

- Monj, Chaharmahal and Bakhtiari
- Monj, Kohgiluyeh and Boyer-Ahmad
- Monj, Razavi Khorasan
- Monj-e Olya, a village in Bavanat County, Fars province, Iran

== See also ==
- Munj (disambiguation)
