= Pamiri =

Pamiri could refer to:

- Pamiri languages spoken in Afghanistan, Tajikistan, and China
- Pamiri people of Afghanistan, Tajikistan
