= Garam Chashma =

Garam Chashma گرم چشمہ
- valley
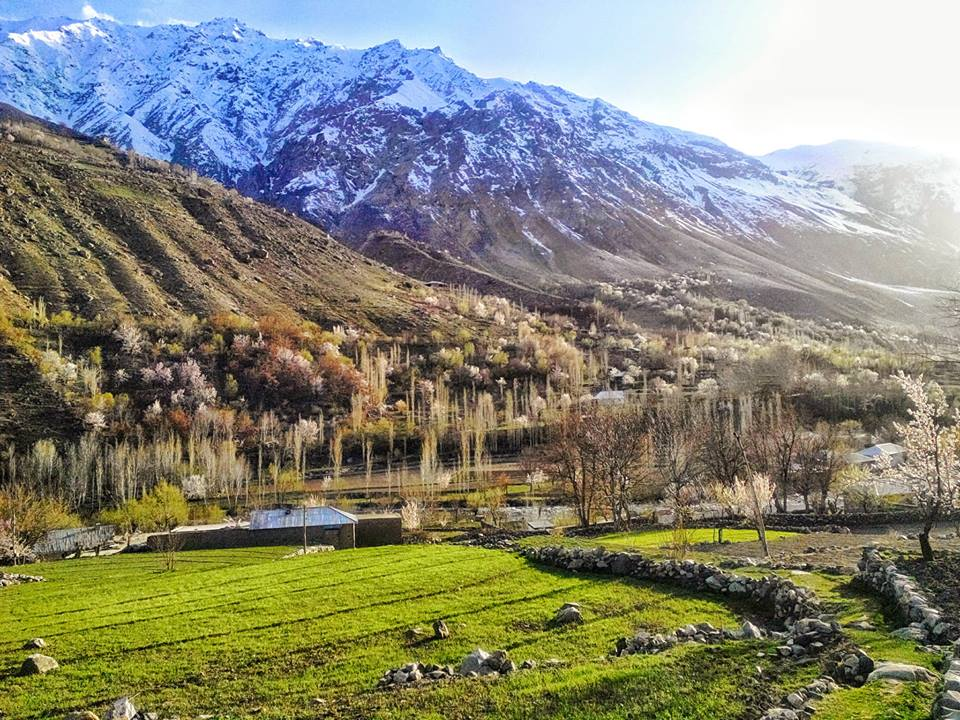
- Spring in Garam Chashma

- Location within Pakistan
- Coordinates: 35°59′36″N 71°33′35″E
- Country: Pakistan
- Province: Khyber Pakhtunkhwa
- District: Lower Chitral
- Elevation: 2,550 m (8,370 ft)

Population (2003)
  - Total: 50,000

Languages
  - Official: Urdu
- Time zone: UTC+5 (PST)
- Postal Code: 17130 - 0xx
- Website: chitral.gov.pk

Garam Chashma (Urdu: گرم چشمہ ; Pashto: ګرم چینه; Dari: چشمه آب گرم) (literally: Hot Spring) is one of the many branch valleys of Chitral, situated in the extreme north-west of Pakistan. It is one of the highest human settlements in the Hindukush ranges with an altitude of almost 2550 meters (8389 feet). The place is known for its hot spring, which is one of the tourist attraction sites. It is also famous for its trout fish. The water flowing down through the length of the valley is famous for fishing sports. The Lotkoh River (Garam Chashma River) running down from the lofty peaks of the Hindu Kush is most suitable for the brown type of trout fish. Other features of the area include snow-covered peaks, pleasant weather, and natural springs, and more recently, has remained in the limelight for being a potential site of hydropower generation. Besides tourists, people suffering from skin diseases also visit the hot spring for treatment (not proven scientifically). It is located in the northwest of Chitral at a distance of about forty-eight kilometres by road. It shares international borders with Afghanistan being situated in the extreme northwest of Pakistan. Dorāh Pass 4,554 metres connects this part of Pakistan with Badakhshan, the adjacent province of Afghanistan.

== Hot spring ==
The spring water emerges from underground sulfur deposits making its temperature rise above boiling point. For the same reason, the spring is also known as Sulphur Spring. The spring is the warmest in the westward extension of the Himalayan Geothermal Belt. It emerges from leucogranites of the Hindu Kush Range that date from 20–18 Ma. Reservoir temperatures may be as high as 260 °C (500 °F). It is not clear whether the circulation of deep groundwater in this region is driven by topography or by tectonic lateral stress.

== Demography ==
The Khowar is the official language spoken in this valley. The population of Garam Chashma is approximately 50,000 people. Since the last census in Pakistan was conducted in 1998, there is no precise source of information in this regard. The male-to-female ratio is almost 50-50. Almost 60 percent of the population is young people. The majority religion in Garam Chashma is Ismaili Shi'ite Islam and adherence to the Aga Khan is widespread.

== Languages ==
Khowar is the main language spoken and understood by the majority of the population. The second most spoken language is Yidgha, an Iranian language spoken by a few thousand people in Parabeg valley. A small number of people, in Gobor Valley, also speak Sheikhan-War, a dialect spoken in the Nuristan province of Afghanistan.

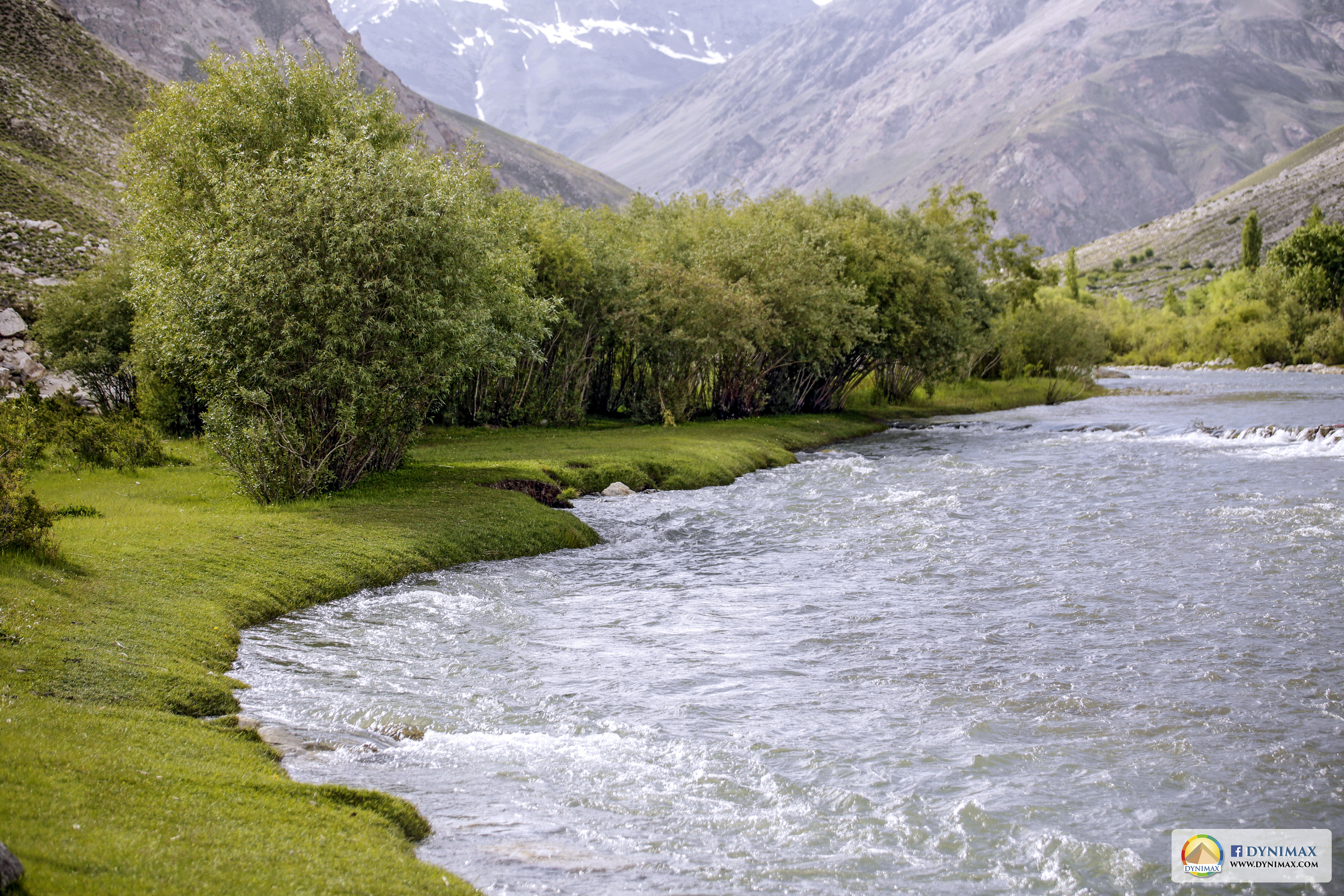
Gobor Valley

In addition, many people understand and some can even speak Persian. This is due to the influence of Nasir Khisraw, the eleventh-century poet and philosopher. One of his disciples had come to this part of the region and settled here permanently. He preached the Ismaili thought, hence marking the dawn of Ismailism in this part of the world. More recently, the neighbouring country, Afghanistan, was involved in the war with the USSR and as a result, a huge influx of refugees fled to this area. Since Garam Chashma was easily accessible from Badakhshan, many Afghans chose to stay and some of the refugees are still living here. This interaction with Dari speakers refreshed the memories associated with Persian.

== Educational institutions ==
- Aga Khan Schools (A network of schools from ECD-High School, spread across the area)
- Government Higher Secondary School Garam Chashma
- Government Higher Secondary School for Women, Izh, Garam Chashma
- Community Based Degree College for Women Ovirk, Garam Chashma
- Government High School Ovirk, Garam Chashma
- Government Primary and Middle School (a network of schools spread across the area)
- Pamir Public School and College, Garam Chashma
- Al-Nasir Community Based School, Garam Chashma
- Chamber of Commerce College, Garam Chashma
- Injigan Ideal Public school, Garam Chashma. (Sardar Gulab)
- Government high school for girls Murdan
- Community school Shagrm (Murdan)
- Government high school Parabag for boys
- Injigan Ideal Public school Chitral, Garamchashma.
