= Zebak, Afghanistan =

Zebak
- Location in Afghanistan
- Coordinates: 36°32′N 71°21′E
- Country: Afghanistan
- Province: Badakhshan
- District: Zebak
- Elevation: 8,500 ft (2,590 m)
- Time zone: UTC+4:30

Zebak (Dari: زيباك or زیباک) (also Zibak or Zebok) is the capital of the Zebak District in the Badakhshan province of Afghanistan. The city is based in the delta of the Sanglich river.

It lies at the foot of the Daliz Pass on one of the natural routes that connects it with Tajikistan approximately 35 kilometers to the north, and with Pakistan which is just 20 kilometers to the south. It has a distinctive landscape and is known for its scenic pasture and natural springs.

Its inhabitants are Ismaili and have a unique language and culture. They speak the Sanglechi-Ishkashmi language.

Nearby villages are Gol Khaneh (1.8 nm), Khal Khan (0.8 nm), Naw Abad (2.0 nm), Ziak (3.7 nm) and Kedah (1.4 nm).

From 2005 on, NGOs have committed a great deal of effort to constructing new roads in the area, with great success. Most of the people in the area live as farmers, growing the land and taking care of great hordes of sheep.

== Climate ==
Zebak has a humid continental climate (Köppen climate classification: Dsb), verging on a subarctic climate (Dsc), with mild, dry summers and cold, snowy winters.

Climate data for Zebak, Badakhshan Province
Month	Jan	Feb	Mar	Apr	May	Jun	Jul	Aug	Sep	Oct	Nov	Dec	Year
Mean daily maximum °C (°F)	−5.6 (21.9)	−4.4 (24.1)	0.9 (33.6)	7.7 (45.9)	12.3 (54.1)	18.0 (64.4)	21.0 (69.8)	21.0 (69.8)	17.3 (63.1)	10.8 (51.4)	3.7 (38.7)	−2.4 (27.7)	8.4 (47.0)
Daily mean °C (°F)	−10.3 (13.5)	−8.6 (16.5)	−3.2 (26.2)	3.1 (37.6)	7.1 (44.8)	12.0 (53.6)	14.9 (58.8)	14.7 (58.5)	10.6 (51.1)	5.0 (41.0)	−1.0 (30.2)	−6.3 (20.7)	3.2 (37.7)
Mean daily minimum °C (°F)	−15.0 (5.0)	−12.8 (9.0)	−7.3 (18.9)	−1.5 (29.3)	1.9 (35.4)	6.1 (43.0)	8.8 (47.8)	8.5 (47.3)	4.0 (39.2)	−0.8 (30.6)	−5.7 (21.7)	−10.2 (13.6)	−2.0 (28.4)
Average precipitation mm (inches)	65 (2.6)	85 (3.3)	117 (4.6)	110 (4.3)	80 (3.1)	23 (0.9)	20 (0.8)	16 (0.6)	10 (0.4)	33 (1.3)	46 (1.8)	66 (2.6)	671 (26.3)
Source: weather2visit.com

== See also ==
- Badakhshan Province
