= Pamir languages =

Areal group of Eastern Iranian languages

Pamir
- Ghalchah (obsolete)
- (ethnically defined)
- Geographic distribution: Pamir Mountains
- Ethnicity: Pamiris
- Linguistic classification: Indo-European: Indo-Iranian; Iranian; Eastern; Southeastern; Pamir

Language codes
- Glottolog: shug1237 Shughni-Yazghulami yidg1239 Yidgha-Munji sang1316 Sanglechi-Ishkashimi wakh1245 Wakhi

The Pamir languages are an areal group of the Eastern Iranian languages, spoken by numerous people in the Pamir Mountains, primarily along the Panj River and its tributaries.

In the 19th and early 20th centuries, the Pamir language family was sometimes referred to as the Ghalchah languages by western scholars. The term Ghalchah is no longer used to refer to the Pamir languages or the native speakers of these languages.

== Geographic distribution ==
Map of modern Iranian languages. The Pamir languages are spoken in the extreme east of the distribution.

The Pamirian languages are spoken primarily in the Badakhshan Province of northeastern Afghanistan and the Gorno-Badakhshan Autonomous Region of eastern Tajikistan.

Pamirian languages are also spoken in Xinjiang and the Pamir language Sarikoli is spoken beyond the Sarikol Range on the Afghanistan-China border and thus qualifies as the easternmost of the extant Iranian languages.

Wakhi communities are also found in the adjacent Chitral District, Khyber Pakhtunkhwa and in Gojal, Gilgit Baltistan in Pakistan.

Other living members of the Southeastern Iranian group are Pashto, Ormuri, and Parachi.

== Classification ==
No features uniting the Pamir languages as a single subgroup of Iranian have been demonstrated. The Ethnologue lists the Pamir languages along with Pashto as Southeastern Iranian, however, according to Encyclopedia Iranica, the Pamirian languages and Pashto belong to the North-Eastern Iranian branch.

Members of the Pamirian language area include four reliable groups: a Shughni-Yazghulam group including Shughni, Sarikoli, and Yazghulami; Munji and Yidgha; Ishkashimi and related dialects; and Wakhi. They have the subject-object-verb syntactic typology.

Václav Blažek (2019) suggests that the Pamir languages have a Burushaski-like substratum. Burushaski is a language isolate spoken in Pakistan to the south of the Pamir language area. It may have formerly had a much wider geographic distribution before being assimilated.

== Subgroups ==
=== Shughni–Yazghulami ===
The Shughni, Sarikoli, Rushani, Bartangi, etc. belong to the Shughni-Rushani branch, also known as Shughni-Sarikoli branch. There are about 250,000 speakers of languages in this subgroup in Afghanistan, Tajikistan, China, Pakistan, and India. In 1982, there were about 20,000 speakers of Sarikoli in the Sarikol Valley located in the Tashkurgan Tajik Autonomous County in Xinjiang Province, China.

As of 1994, approximately 4,000 people spoke Yazghulami, primarily residing along the Yazgulyam River in Tajikistan. The language has no established writing system.

The Vanji language was historically spoken in the Vanj river valley, located in the Gorno-Badakhshan Autonomous Region of Tajikistan, and was closely related to the Yazghulami. In the 19th century, following the annexation of the region by the Bukharan Emirate, a campaign of assimilation was carried out. By the end of the century, the Vanji language had become extinct, having been replaced by Tajik Persian.

=== Munji–Yidgha ===
The Munji and Yidgha languages are closely related. There are about 6,000 speakers of Yidgha in Upper Lotkoh Valley recorded in the former Chitral district of Pakistan, and in 2008 there were around 5,300 speakers of Munji mainly in the Mamalgha and Munjan valleys in the Kuran wa Munjan district of the Badakhshan province in northeastern Afghanistan. Munji-Yidgha shares with Bactrian a development *ð > /l/, absent from the other three Pamir groups. The extinct Sarghulami language of Badakhshan is thought to be of the Munji-Yidgha branch.

=== Sanglechi–Ishkashimi ===
There are about 2,500 speakers of Sanglechi and Ishkashmi in Afghanistan and Tajikistan respectively; they are not written languages.

=== Wakhi ===
There are around 58,000 speakers of the Wakhi language in Afghanistan, Tajikistan, China, Pakistan, and Russia.

== Status ==
The vast majority of Pamir speakers in Tajikistan and Afghanistan also use Persian as a literary language, the historical literary language of the Iranian world. Persian belongs to the Western Iranian branch, unlike the Pamir languages, which belong to the Eastern Iranian branch. The language group is endangered, with the total number of speakers roughly around 100,000 in 1990.

== Study ==
One of the most prolific researchers of the Pamir languages was Soviet linguist Ivan Ivanovich Zarubin. Linguist Ross Perlin is also leading a Pamir languages research and preservation project at the Endangered Language Alliance.

== See also ==
- Wakhan

== Bibliography ==
- Payne, John, "Pamir languages" in Compendium Linguarum Iranicarum, ed. Schmitt (1989), 417–444.
