= Munja =

Munja may refer to:

- Munja Aboriginal Cattle Station or Munja Aboriginal reserve, historic property within the Charnley River–Artesian Range Wildlife Sanctuary, Western Australia
- Munja i grom, a song by Vukašin Brajić
- Munjamyeong of Goguryeo, a 5th-century monarch of Goguryeo in present-day Korea
- Tripidium bengalense, synonym Saccharum munja, a grass
- Upanayana, a Hindu ceremony
- Vakpati Munja, 10th century Paramara king from Malwa region of central India

== See also ==
- Munj (disambiguation)
- Munji (disambiguation)
- Munjya, a 2024 Indian horror film
