= Kaniguram Valley =

Valley in Pakistan

Coordinates: 32°31′N 69°47′E

The Kaniguram Valley is a mountainous region in South Waziristan District, Khyber Pakhtunkhwa province, Pakistan. It is inhabited by the Ormur people. During the Operation Rah-e-Nijat against the Tehrik-i-Taliban Pakistan, nearly whole population of the valley was forced to leave.

Pir Roshan was born in the area.

== See also ==
- Kaniguram
