= Ishkashimi language =

Iranian language primarily spoken in Badakhshan

Ishkashimi
- škošmi zəvůk
- Škošmi in Nastaliq and Cyrillic
- Native to: Afghanistan, Tajikistan
- Native speakers: 3,000 (2009)
- Language family: Indo-European: Indo-Iranian; Iranian; Southeastern; Sanglechi-Ishkashimi; Ishkashimi
- Writing system: Cyrillic, Persian script

Language codes
- ISO 639-3: isk
- Glottolog: ishk1244
- ELP: Ishkashimi
- Linguasphere: 58-ABD-db

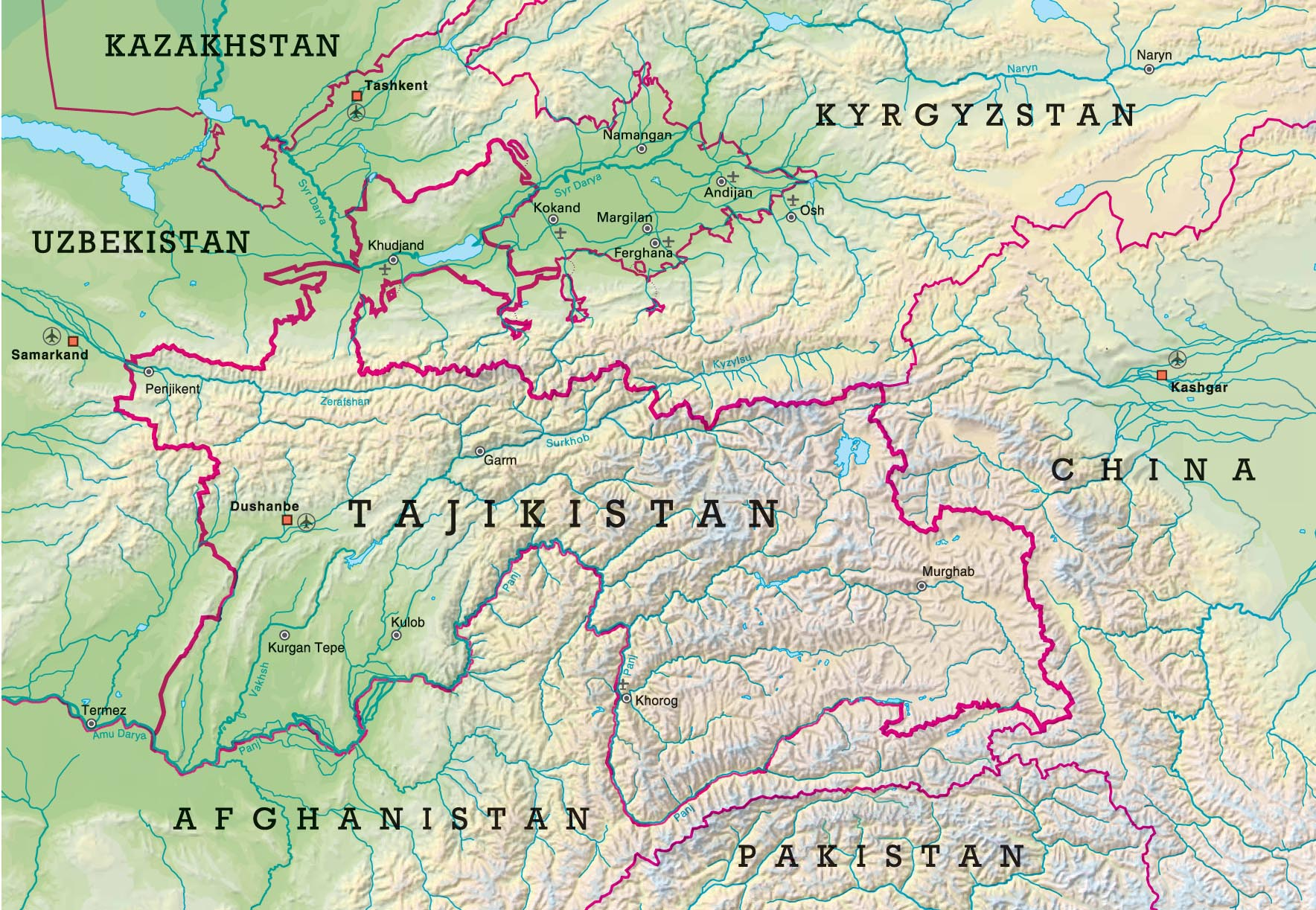
The Badakhshan, Gorno-Badakhshan, and Chitral regions together

Ishkashimi (Ishkashimi: škošmī zəvuk/rənīzəvuk) is an Eastern Iranian language spoken by the Ishkashimi people who predominantly live in the Badakhshan Province in Afghanistan and in Gorno-Badakhshan Autonomous Region in Tajikistan.

The total number of speakers is c. 2,500, most of whom are now dispersed throughout Tajikistan and Afghanistan and small villages within the vicinity. Based on this number, Ishkashimi is threatened to becoming critically endangered or extinct in the next 100 years, being completely replaced by Persian in Tajikistan and Afghanistan. Besides, information about Ishkashimi language is limited due to the lack of extensive and systematic research and the lack of a written system.

Ishkashimi is closely related to Sanglechi dialects, spoken in Zebak District, Afghanistan. It was grouped until recently with the Sanglechi dialect under the parent family Sanglechi-Ishkashimi (sgl), but a more comprehensive linguistic analysis showed significant differences between these speech varieties. Phonology and grammar of Ishkashimi language is similar to phonology and grammar of the closely related Zebaki dialect.

== Name ==
The name Ishkashimi (natively called Škošmi), may have been adopted from an Indo-Aryan form *śaka-kṣamā, meaning "land of the Saka", which refers to an ancient Eastern Iranian tribe.

== Geographic distribution ==
The Ishkashimi language has approximately 2500 speakers, of which 1500 speakers are in the Ishkashim and Wakhan districts and a variety of villages in the Badakhshan Province in Afghanistan, and 1000 speakers are in the Gorno-Badakhshan Autonomous Region in Tajikistan, particularly in Ishkoshim town and neighboring Ryn and Sumjin villages.

== Classification ==
Ishkashimi is an Eastern Iranian language of the Indo-European family. Originally Ishkashimi was considered to belong to the Sanglechi-Ishkashimi family of Eastern Iranian languages. But recent research showed that such a combination was inappropriate for these dialects due to the significant linguistic differences between them. And on January 18, 2010 the parent language had retired and been split into what are now Sanglechi and Ishkashimi dialects. This subfamily has furthermore been considered a part of the Pamir languages group, together with the Wakhi language, and of the subgroup comprising Shughni, Rushani, Sarikoli, Yazgulyam, etc. However, this is an areal rather than genetic grouping.

=== Official status ===
Ishkashimi is a threatened language that does not have a status of official language in the countries of its use.

=== Language domain ===
The Ishkashimi language vitality, despite the positive attitudes towards the language, is declining due to increasing use by native speakers of Persian in Afghanistan and Tajikistan in a variety of domains, such as education, religious, private domain and others. For example, due to Persian being the language of the education system, almost all Ishkashimi speakers, and especially the younger ones, have high Persian proficiency. Education can get complicated with the use of two languages, therefore schools prefer to use Persian. Instructions are solely in Persian, but rarely will teachers speak Ishkashimi to students for explanations. Similar to schools, religion is widely practiced in Persian especially for preaching and prayers, and when it comes to mass media and the government, Persian is exclusively used. Meanwhile, in the private and community domains both Persian and Ishkashimi languages are used equally. In Tajikistan Ishkashimi is a first choice for communication between family members and in private conversations between friends and coworkers, however the use of Persian officially and Wakhi locally in other domains leads to decline in Ishkashimi use. There is an understanding in the Ishkashimi speaking community that the language can face a possible extinction because of its limited use .

== Dialects/varieties ==
There are Afghan and Tajik Ishkashimi varieties of Ishkashimi language, and they're considered to be mutually comprehensible, as some sociolinguistic questionnaires demonstrated.

== Phonology ==
=== Vowels ===
There are seven vowel phonemes: /i ɪ e ä o ʊ u/.

3 Groups
Long and stable	e	i	o	u	ʊ
Varying	ä				
Short	ɪ				

=== Consonants ===
There are thirty two consonant phonemes:

		Labial	Dental/ Alveolar	Retroflex	Post-alv./ Palatal	Velar	Uvular	Glottal
Nasal		m	n					
Stop	voiceless	p	t	ʈ		k	q	
Stop	voiced	b	d	ɖ		ɡ		
Affricate	voiceless		t͡s		t͡ʃ			
Affricate	voiced		d͡z		d͡ʒ			
Fricative	voiceless	f	s	ʂ	ʃ	x		(h)
Fricative	voiced	v	z	ʐ	ʒ	ɣ		
Approximant		w	l	ɭ	j	w		
Tap/Trill			r					

- The use of the consonant [h] in the language is optional.

=== Stress ===
There are many exceptions, stress falls on the last syllable in a word with multiple syllables. Sometimes, as a result of the rhythm in the phrase, the stress will freely move to syllables other than the last syllable.

== Grammar ==
=== Morphology ===
- Ishkashimi is a genderless language like Persian.
- There is no variation between adjectives and no distinction in number.
- Unlike Persian, the expression of comparatives and superlatives is done through syntax and adverbial modifiers, while pre- and postpositions and suffixes are used for case relations like Persian.

==== Suffixes ====
Function	Suffixes	Example
Plural	-ó	olax-ó (mountains)
Indefinite article	-(y)i	
Derivation	-don, -dor, -bon	

==== Pronouns ====
Personal pronouns
Singular	Plural		
I	we	you	they
az (i)	məx(o)	təməx	tə

Demonstrative pronouns (used for third person pronouns*)
this (near me)	that (near you)	that (near him/them)(near him/them)

==== Numerals ====
Ishkashimi numerals
	1	2	3	4	5	6	7	8	9	10	20
Ishkashimi	wok	dōu	rōī	čōr	ponj	xol	hōvd	hōt	nao	das	wīst

==== Tenses ====
STEM	FORMATION	EXAMPLE
Present Stem	personal endings	
Past Stem	endings are movable	γažd-əm (“I said”)
Perfect Stem	endings are movable	γaž-əm ("I say")

=== Syntax ===
The word order in Ishkashimi is SOV (Subject–object–verb) like most Iranian languages, however the order can be influenced by the varieties of the information structure in the sentences.

== Vocabulary ==
=== Borrowed words ===
A significant part of Ishkashimi vocabulary contains words and syntactic structures that were borrowed from Persian.

=== Taboo words ===
Taboo words were formed and added into Ishkashimi language as a result of use of ancient epithets and of derivation of the words from other languages, mostly from Persian, often followed by the change of their meaning and pronunciation. Some of the taboo Ishkashimi words, which are also similarly seen as taboo in other Pamir languages, are as follows:

- Xirs - for bear
- Sabilik - for wolf
- Urvesok - for fox
- Si - for hare
- Purk - for mouse/rat

== Writing system ==
Ishkashimi is a non-written language that does not have a writing system or literature. The Persian language, which is the literary and primary language of the region, has been used to write down some of the traditional folklore. There were, however, some efforts made at the end of the twentieth century to implement a writing system based on Cyrillic alphabet.

=== Written sources ===
The first attempts by linguists to collect and organize data about the Ishkashimi language were made around the beginning of the 19th century, and were later continued by Russian and Ishkashimi linguists, such as T. Pakhalina. Before any systematic description and documentation of Ishkashimi language, the researchers collected some random vocabulary examples and mentioned the language in the works about Iranian languages. Only in the end of the twentieth century linguists created a more comprehensive description of Ishkashimi language.

=== Alphabets ===
Table of correspondence between Ishkashimi alphabets:

IPA	Karamshoyev 1992	Latifov 2019	Nazarova, Nazarov 2019
[a]	А а		
[b]	Б б		
[v]	В в		
[w]	Въ въ	В̌ в̌	Ԝ ԝ
[g]	Г г		
[ʁ]	Ғ ғ		
[d]	Д д		
[ɖ]	Дъ дъ	Д̈ д̈	Д̣ д̣
[e]	Е е	Е е, Э э	Е е
[ə]	Ь ь	Ә ә	
[ʒ]	Ж ж	Җ җ	Ж ж
[ʐ]	Жъ жъ	Ж ж	Ж̣ ж̣
[z]	З з		
[d͡z]	Зъ зъ	Ц̌ ц̌	Ӡ ӡ
[i], [ɪ]	И и		
[j]	Й й		
[k]	К к		
[q]	Қ қ		
[l]	Л л		
[ɭ]	Лъ лъ	—	Л̣ л̣
[m]	М м		
[n]	Н н		
[o], [ɔ]	О о		
[p]	П п		
[r]	Р р		
[s]	С с		
[t]	Т т		
[ʈ]	Тъ тъ	Т̈ т̈	Т̣ т̣
[u]	У у		
[ʊ]	—	О̃ о̃	У̊ у̊
[f]	Ф ф		
[χ]	Х х		
[t͡s]	Ц ц		
[t͡ʃ]	Ч ч		
[ʈ͡ʂ]	Чъ чъ	Ӵ ӵ	Ч̣ ч̣
[d͡ʒ]	Ҷ ҷ		
[ʃ]	Ш ш	Щ щ	Ш ш
[ʂ]	Шъ шъ	Ш ш	Ш̣ ш̣
[d͡ʑ]	Чъ Чъ	—	—

One of the current versions of the Ishkashimi alphabet:

А а	Б б	В в	В̌ в̌	Г г	Ғ ғ	Д д	Д̈ д̈	Е е	Ё ё	Ж ж
Җ җ	З з	И и	Й й	К к	Қ қ	Л л	М м	Н н	О о	О̃ о̃
П п	Р р	С с	Т т	Т̈ т̈	У у	Ф ф	Х х	Ц ц	Ц̌ ц̌	Ч ч
Ӵ ӵ	Ҷ ҷ	Ш ш	Щ щ	Ә ә	Э э	Ю ю	Я я			

== Bibliography ==
- Bauer, B. L., & Pinault, G. J. (Eds.). (2003). Language in time and space: a festschrift for Werner Winter on the occasion of his 80th birthday. Mouton De Gruyter.
- Beck, S. (2012). The effect of accessibility on language vitality: the Ishkashimi and the Sanglechi speech varieties in Afghanistan. Linguistic Discovery, 10(2), pp. 196–234. Data Elicitation in Endangered Pamiri communities: Interdependence of Language and History. p. 3.
- Grierson, G. A. (1921). Specimens of Languages of the Eranian Family: Compiled and Edited by George Abraham Grierson. Superintendent Government Printing, India. pp. 505–508.
- Ishkashimi. Glottolog.
- Ishkashimi. Ethnologue.
- Tiessen, C., Abbess, E., Müller, K., Paul, D., Tiessen, G., (2010). "Ishkashimi: a father's language" (Survey report). Sil.org. Tajikistan. p. 3.
- Windfuhr, G. (2013). "The Iranian Languages". Routledge. ISBN 9781135797034, pp. 773–777.
