= Khal Khan =

Khal Khan Khal Khān
- Location in Afghanistan
- Coordinates: 36°32′29″N 71°21′10″E
- Country: Afghanistan
- Province: Badakhshan Province
- District: Zebak
- Time zone: + 4.30

Khal Khan is a village in Badakhshan Province in north-eastern Afghanistan.

The language spoken by the majority of Khalkhana’s population is Dari. The main sector of the economy is agriculture. The principal crops grown in the surrounding fields are wheat and maize.
