= Ormuri =

Eastern Iranian language spoken in Pakistan

- Baraki, Ormur, Ormui, Bargista
- اورموړی
- Native to: Pakistan
- Region: South Waziristan
- Native speakers: 6,000 (2004)
- Language family: Indo-European: Indo-Iranian; Iranian; Ormuri–Parachi; Ormuri
- Writing system: Perso-Arabic

Language codes
- ISO 639-3: oru
- Glottolog: ormu1247
- ELP: Ormuri
- Ormuri is classified as Definitely Endangered by the UNESCO Atlas of the World's Languages in Danger

Ormuri (اورموړی [oɾˈmuɽi]), also known as Baraki or Bargista, is an Eastern Iranian language spoken in the Waziristan region of Pakistan. It is primarily spoken by the Ormur people in the town of Kaniguram in South Waziristan. A small number of speakers are also found in Logar, Afghanistan. The language belongs to the Eastern-Iranian language group. The extremely small number of speakers makes Ormuri an endangered language that is considered to be in a "threatened" state.

Ormuri is notable for its unusual sound inventory, which includes a voiceless alveolar trill that does not exist in the surrounding Pashto. Ormuri also has voiceless and voiced alveolo-palatal fricatives (the voiceless being contrastive with the more common voiceless palato-alveolar fricative), which also exist in the Waziristani dialect of Pashto, but could have been adopted from Ormuri due to its close proximity.

== Classification ==
Ormuri is an Iranian language belonging to the Indo-Iranian subdivision of the Indo-European languages. Glottolog classifies it within the Ormuri-Parachi subgroup of Iranian languages. Similarly, Ethnologue also classifies it within the Ormur-Parachi subgroup, however, places them among the Norhwestern Iranian languages. Despite being spoken in the eastern part of the Iranian language area, Ormuri and Parachi share some common islogloss and linguistic and structural features with some Northwestern Iranian languages, such as Zaza, Semnani, Sangsari.

=== Language status ===
According to the Endangered Languages Project, the Ormuri language is highly threatened. The language is used for face-to-face communication, however it is losing users.

== History ==
The Ormuri language is used by the Ormur/Baraki tribe in parts of the Kaniguram Valley in Waziristan, Pakistan. The language is also used in a small part of Logar Province, Afghanistan.

=== Ormuri tribe ===
An alternate name used by the Ormur people is Baraki. It is believed that there were eight to ten thousand families in the Logar area at the beginning of the 19th century and approximately four to five hundred families in Kaniguram at the beginning of the 20th century. The Ormur tribe does not occupy an ethnically homogeneous territory. In Afghanistan, the Ormur people live in mixed communities with both Tajiks and Pashtuns. Whereas, in Pakistan, the Ormur people live only with the Pashtuns.

Early history of the tribe can be traced in Herodotus' book. The Persian Emperor Darius Hystaspes; Governor of Egypt conquered the Greek colonies of Barca and Cyrene in Libya and took them to Egypt on their return from expedition. At this time, the King returned from his Scythian campaign to his capital, Susa. The Barakis were given a village in Bactria to live in, later named Barke. After two thousand three hundred and fifty years, the village was still inhabited in 1891 within the same territory.

=== Ormuri language ===
The endonym ormuṛ is originally derived from the Pashto word for 'fire'. The first man to have made mention of the Baraki language was Babar, in his book Baburnama. Ormuri, also called Birki at the time, was one of the eleven to twelve tongues that were observed by Babar while in the region of Kabul. It is known that many of the Ormuri speakers are at least bilingual or trilingual, speaking other tribal languages such as Pashto, Persian, Dari, or Kaboli

Pir Roshan (Bayazid Khan) was one of the first known Pashto prose writers and composers of Pashto alphabets who used several Ormuri words in his book Khairul-Bayan. A few of the words that were used within his book were nalatti ('pigs'), nmandzak [of Mazdak] ('mosque'), teshtan ('owner'), burghu ('flout'), haramunai ('ill-born'), etc.

=== Research ===
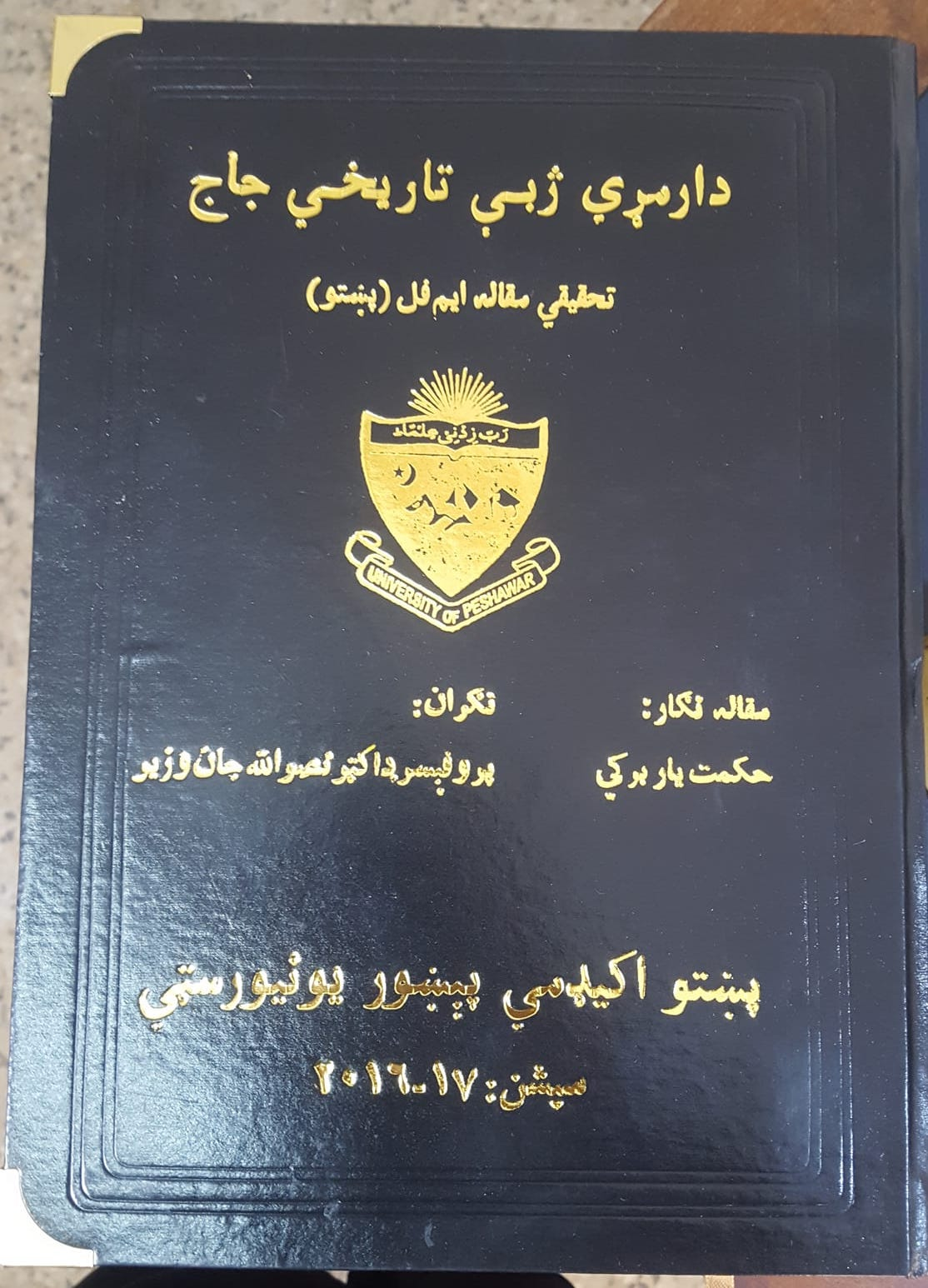
In Pashto: A historical examination of Ormuri

Hikmatyar Burki has also done an MPhil on Ormuri and published his work through the Pashto Academy.

== Research on the Ormuri language ==
The study of the Ormuri (Urmari) language has been carried out by a small number of linguists and researchers across Europe, South Asia, and the former Soviet Union, as well as by indigenous scholars. Their work spans documentation, grammatical description, historical classification, and language preservation.

=== Key researchers ===
==== Rozi Khan Burki ====
Rozi Khan Burki is a Pakistani civil servant and language activist known for his work on the documentation and preservation of Ormuri.

Although not trained in the classical European linguistic tradition, he is regarded as one of the most important indigenous contributors to modern Ormuri documentation.

Contributions include:

- Compilation of approximately 5,000 Ormuri lexical entries for a dictionary project
- Authorship of Dying Languages: Focus on Ormuri (2001)
- Development of an Ormuri orthography system (among the first of its kind)
- Collection of oral materials including poetry, vocabulary, and conversational usage
- Collaboration with linguistic NGOs involved in field documentation
- Advocacy for the preservation of Ormuri through education and awareness initiatives

Burki is primarily recognized as a community-based documentation figure rather than a formal academic classifier of the language.

==== Georg Morgenstierne ====
Georg Morgenstierne was a Norwegian linguist and one of the most influential scholars in Indo-Iranian frontier linguistics.

He conducted the first systematic linguistic fieldwork on Ormuri during the 1920s and 1930s.

Contributions include:

- Early phonological and grammatical description of Ormuri
- Comparative analysis with Pashto and Parachi
- Establishment of Ormuri as an Eastern Iranian language with a highly isolated structure
- Identification of archaic linguistic features preserved in the language

Morgenstierne is widely regarded as the founder of modern scientific research on Ormuri.

==== Charles M. Kieffer ====
Charles M. Kieffer is a French linguist considered the leading modern academic authority on Ormuri.

He conducted extensive field research in Afghanistan between the 1950s and 1970s.

Contributions include:

- Publication of a comprehensive grammar, Grammaire de l’ormuri de Baraki-Barak
- Fieldwork in Logar Province, Afghanistan, and data collection from Kaniguram
- Detailed analysis of Ormuri syntax and dialectal variation
- Historical classification within the Eastern Iranian language group

Kieffer's work is considered the most complete grammatical description of Ormuri to date.

==== Vladimir A. Efimov ====
Vladimir A. Efimov, associated with Soviet linguistic scholarship, contributed to the structural and historical analysis of Ormuri.

Contributions include:

- The Ormuri Language: Synchronic and Historical Analysis
- Studies of phonological development and grammatical structure
- Comparative analysis with Pashto and Parachi
- Integration of Ormuri into broader Iranian historical linguistics

His work contributed to a deeper understanding of Ormuri's historical development.

==== Modern typological researchers ====
Modern research has continued through Indo-Iranian and typological linguists, including Artem Trofimov and colleagues.

Research focus includes:

- Classification of Ormuri within the Eastern Iranian subgroup
- Comparative studies with Pashto and Parachi
- Use of lexical databases such as Swadesh lists
- Accentual and historical reconstruction models

These studies aim to situate Ormuri within modern Indo-European linguistic frameworks.

== Academic timeline of Ormuri research ==
Period	Researchers	Focus
19th century	Early colonial observers	Word lists and initial references
1920–1930s	Georg Morgenstierne	First systematic linguistic description
1950–1970s	Charles M. Kieffer	Comprehensive grammar and field documentation
1980–2000s	Vladimir A. Efimov and Soviet linguists	Historical and structural analysis
2000s–present	Rozi Khan Burki and modern typologists	Documentation, preservation, and classification refinement

== Scholarly significance ==
Research on Ormuri has generally been shaped by three major scholarly contributions:

- Georg Morgenstierne – established the foundational scientific classification of the language
- Charles M. Kieffer – produced the most comprehensive grammatical description
- Rozi Khan Burki – contributed significantly to modern documentation and language preservation efforts

== Linguistic classification context ==
Modern research places Ormuri within the Eastern Iranian languages, with close relationships and comparative interest in:

- Pashto, as the closest major Eastern Iranian relative
- Parachi, as a structurally similar minority language
- Nuristani languages, due to geographical proximity and contact influences

== Relative similarity to Parachi and Pashto ==
Linguistic comparison shows that Ormuri is generally closer to Parachi than to Pashto.

=== Parachi ===
Parachi and Ormuri share:

- Conservative grammatical structures
- Retention of older Iranian phonological features
- Limited external linguistic influence
- Small endangered speaker populations

=== Pashto ===
Pashto, while also Eastern Iranian, differs due to:

- Greater standardization and expansion
- Strong internal linguistic innovations
- Larger divergence in phonology and grammar

== Comparison overview ==
Feature	Ormuri	Parachi	Pashto
Iranian branch	Eastern	Eastern	Eastern
Structural conservatism	Very high	Very high	Medium
Vocabulary similarity to Ormuri	—	High	Medium–low
Grammar similarity	—	Higher	Lower
Mutual intelligibility	None	None	None
Relative closeness	—	Closest	More distant

== See also ==
- Eastern Iranian languages
- Parachi language
- Pashto language
- Nuristani languages
- Indo-Iranian languages

== Geographic distribution ==
Ormuri is spoken primarily in the town of Kaniguram in South Waziristan, Pakistan. A small population also speaks it in the town of Baraki Barak in Logar Province, Baraki area in Kabul Afghanistan. The language is sustained by nearly fifty adherents in Afghanistan and around five to six thousand speakers in Pakistan

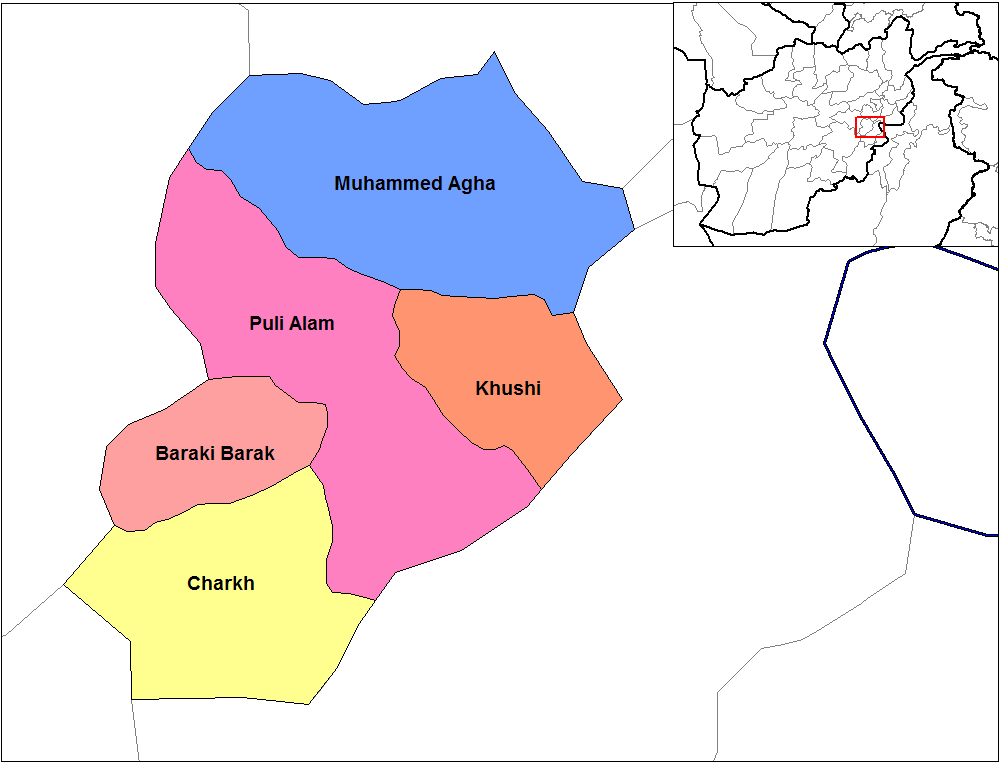
Districts of Logar province. This image does not include Azra district, located to the east of Khoshi and Mohammad Agha districts.

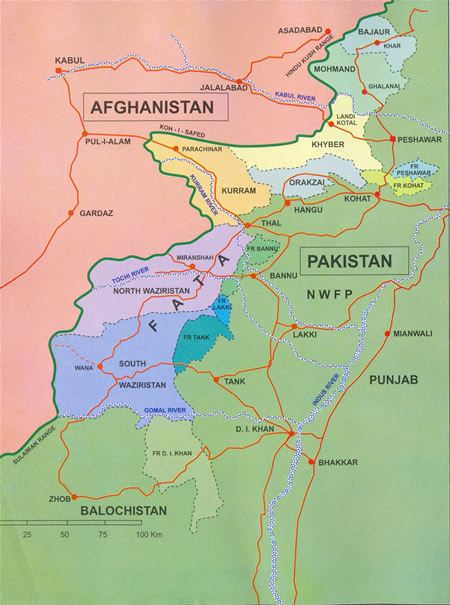
North (purple) and South (blue) Waziristan and surrounding Federally Administered Tribal Areas and provinces

=== Dialects ===
There are two dialects of Ormuri; one is spoken in Kaniguram, Waziristan, which is the more archaic dialect, and the other one in Baraki-Barak, Logar. The Kaniguram dialect is not understood in Baraki-Barak. The linguist Georg Morgenstierne wrote:

While Kaniguram has borrowed freely from Waziri Pashto, the vocabulary of Logar has been influenced by other Pashto dialects, and, to a still greater extent, by Persian.

The dialect of Kaniguram is currently strong, spoken by a relatively prosperous community of Ormur in an isolated part of the rugged Waziristan hills. However, the position of the dialect of Baraki Barak is not strong. Morgenstierne wrote he was told that:

Ormuri was no longer spoken in Baraki Barak, the ancient headquarters of the Ormur tribe. Even a man said to be from this village denied the existence of any other language than Persian and Pashto in his native place.

==== Lexical differences ====
Table 1: Lexical differences in Ormuri
	Logar	Kaniguram
'blind'	kor	wond
'soft'	narm	nořh
'fox'	roba	rawas
'flea'	kayk	řak
'shepherd'	čopan	šwān
'comb'	šåná	šhak(k)
'place'	jåy	jikak
'to fly'	parók	buryék

==== Differences in phonetic forms ====
Table 2: Differences in the phonetic form of vowels in Ormuri
	Logar	Kaniguram
'to go'	tsok	tsek, tsyek
'one'	še	sa
'house'	ner	nar
'dry'	wuk	wyok
'water'	wok	wak
'to sit'	nóstok	nástak

The vowel system of Ormuri is characterized as heterogenous. The language consists of a subsystem of vowels that found native within Ormuri vocabulary, as well as a subsystem of vowels that is considered "borrowed vocabulary." The differences seen between the Logar and Kaniguram dialects are mainly based on the quality of vowels instead of the quantity.

The system is based on six phonemes: i, e, a, å, o, u.

Table 3: Differences in the phonetic form of consonants in Ormuri
	Logar	Kaniguram
'one'	še	sa
'three'	šo	ři
'six'	xo	ša
'above'	pa-bega	pa-beža
'snow'	ɣoš	ɣoř

The consonant system varies slightly between both the dialects of Kaniguram and Logar. The Logar native consonant system contains 25 phonemes, while the Kaniguram system has 27.

== Phonology ==
=== Consonants ===
		Labial	Dental/ Alveolar	Retroflex	Post-alv./ Palatal	Velar	Uvular		Glottal
		Labial	Dental/ Alveolar	Retroflex	Post-alv./ Palatal	Velar	plain	labialised	Glottal
Nasal		m	n	(ɳ)					
Stop	voiceless	p	t	(ʈ)		k	(q)		
Stop	voiced	b	d	(ɖ)		ɡ			
Affricate	voiceless		t͡s		t͡ʃ				
Affricate	voiced		d͡z		d͡ʒ				
Fricative	voiceless	f	s	(ʂ)^{1}	ʃ	x^{2}	χ	χʷ^{1}	h
Fricative	voiced	w	z	(ʐ)^{1}	ʒ	ɣ^{2}	ʁ	ʁʷ^{1}	
Approximant		w	l		j	w			
Tap/Trill	plain		r	(ɽ)					
Tap/Trill	fricative		r̝^{1}						

1. Only in Kaniguram.
2. Only in Logar.

/t͡ʃ/ and /d͡ʒ/ are uncommon in native vocabulary. In both dialects free variation of dental and postalveolar affricates is widespread. /r̝/ usually corresponds to /ʃ/ in Logar.

Ľubomír (2013) claims there is a voiceless retroflex non-sibilant fricative [ɻ̊˔].

=== Vowels ===
	Front	Central	Back	
Close	i		u	
Mid	e		o	
Open		a	ɑ^{1}	ɒ^{2}

1. Only in Kaniguram.
2. Only in Logar.

=== Syllabic Patterns ===
Proper Ormuri words will have the following syllabic patterns: V, VC, CV, CCV, (C)VCC, CVC, CCVC, CCVCC. Both dialects from Kaniguram and Logar have similar syllabic structure.

==== Examples ====
- a 'this'
- (w)un 'so much'
- pe 'father'
- gri 'mountain'
- åxt 'eight'
- måx 'we'
- spok 'dog'
- breš 'burn'
- broxt 'burned, burnt'
- wroxt 'beard'

At the end of certain words CC occurs as spirant/sonant + occlusive. When separating most words into syllables, a medial CC will be divided:

- al-gox-tok 'to fall'
- kir-ží 'hen'
- er-zåk 'to come'

== Morphology ==
The language has undergone extensive change in comparison to its ancestral self. For nominal morphology (nouns, adjectives, and pronouns), aspects of the Kaniguram dialect of grammatical gender has completely been lost in the Logar. In terms of the verbal morphology, there is a greater variety of conjugations of modal and tense-aspect forms based on the present-tense stem. There is also a distinction made between masculine and feminine words based on the past-tense system. Finally, there is a greater number of distinctions between within the system of tense-aspect forms and there are different types of ergative constructions.

There is a developed system of noun and verb inflections. Nominal parts of speech contains: Three numbers (singular, dual, and plural), three genders (masculine, feminine, and neuter), and the verb has two voices (active and middle). There is the elimination of the category of case (loss in nouns, adjectives, numerals, and certain pronouns). There is also a complete loss of the category of gender, varying on the dialect (Complete loss in Logar and rudimentary masculine and feminine forms remain in Kaniguram). In Logar most original Ormuri nouns and adjectives have a simple stem ending in a consonant and a few nouns end in unstressed (or rarely stressed) -a or -i. Whereas in Kaniguram, the stem usually ends in a consonant, but both nouns and adjectives may end in -a or -i.

== Orthography ==
Ormuri uses the Pashto script with the additional letters ڒ /r̝/, ݫ /ʑ/ and ݭ /ɕ/ :

Name	IPA	Transliteration	Contextual forms			Isolated	Latin	Unicode(Hex)
Name	Symbol	Transliteration	Final	Medial	Initial	Isolated	Latin	Unicode(Hex)
alif	[ɑ]	ā	ـا	ـا	آ, ا	آ, ا	Ā ā	U+0627, U+0622
be	[b]	b	ـب	ـبـ	بـ	ب	B b	U+0628
pe	[p]	p	ـپ	ـپـ	پـ	پ	P p	U+067E
te	[t̪]	t	ـت	ـتـ	تـ	ت	T t	U+062A
ṭe	[ʈ]	ṭ	ـټ	ـټـ	ټـ	ټ	Ṭ ṭ	U+067C
se	[s]	s	ـث	ـثـ	ثـ	ث	S s	U+062B
jim	[d͡ʒ]	j	ـج	ـجـ	جـ	ج	J j	U+062C
če	[t͡ʃ]	č	ـچ	ـچـ	چـ	چ	Č č	U+0686
he	[h] / [hː]	h	ـح	ـحـ	حـ	ح	H h	U+062D
xe	[x]	x	ـخ	ـخـ	خـ	خ	X x	U+062E
tse	[t͡s]	ts	ـڅ	ـڅـ	څـ	څ	Ts ts	U+0685
dzim	[d͡z]	dz	ـځ	ـځـ	ځـ	ځ	Dz dz	U+0681
dāl	[d̪]	d	ـد	ـد	د	د	D d	U+062F
ḍāl	[ɖ]	ḍ	ـډ	ـډ	ډ	ډ	Ḍ ḍ	U+0689
zāl	[z]	z	ـذ	ـذ	ذ	ذ	Z z	U+0630
re	[r]	r	ـر	ـر	ر	ر	R r	U+0631
ře	[r̝]	ř	ـڒ	ـڒ	ڒ	ڒ	Ř ř	U+0692
ṛe	[ɽ]	ṛ	ـړ	ـړ	ړ	ړ	Ṛ ṛ	U+0693
ze	[z]	z	ـز	ـز	ز	ز	Z z	U+0632
že	[ʒ]	ž	ـژ	ـژ	ژ	ژ	Ž ž	U+0698
źe	[ʑ]	ź	ـݫ	ـݫ	ݫ	ݫ	Ź ź	U+076B
sin	[s]	s	ـس	ـسـ	سـ	س	S s	U+0633
šin	[ʃ]	š	ـش	ـشـ	شـ	ش	Š š	U+0634
śin	[ɕ]	ś	ـݭ	ـݭـ	ݭـ	ݭ	Ś ś	U+076D
swād	[s]	s	ـص	ـصـ	صـ	ص	S s	U+0635
zwād	[z]	z	ـض	ـضـ	ضـ	ض	Z z	U+0636
twe	[t]	t	ـط	ـطـ	طـ	ط	T t	U+0637
zwe	[z]	z	ـظ	ـظـ	ظـ	ظ	Z z	U+0638
ayn	[ɑ] / [ɑː]	ā	ـع	ـعـ	عـ	ع	Ā ā	U+0639
ğayn	[ɣ]	ğ	ـغ	ـغـ	غـ	غ	Ğ ğ	U+063A
fe	[f]	f	ـف	ـفـ	فـ	ف	F f	U+0641
qāp	[q] / [k]	q	ـق	ـقـ	قـ	ق	Q q	U+0642
kāp	[k]	k	ـک	ـکـ	کـ	ک	K k	U+06A9
gāp	[ɡ]	g	ـګ	ـګـ	ګـ	ګ	G g	U+06AB
lām	[l]	l	ـل	ـلـ	لـ	ل	L l	U+0644
mim	[m]	m	ـم	ـمـ	مـ	م	M m	U+0645
nun	[n]	n	ـن	ـنـ	نـ	ن	N n	U+0646
ṇun	[ɳ]	ṇ	ـڼ	ـڼـ	ڼـ	ڼ	Ṇ ṇ	U+06BC
nūn ğunna	[ ̃]	̃ (over vowel)	ں	ـنـ	نـ	ں	N n	U+06BA
wāw	[w], [u], [o]	w, u, o	ـو	ـو	و	و	W w, U u, O o	U+0648
he	[h], [a]	h, a	ـه	ـهـ	هـ	ه	H h, A a	U+0647
kajīra he	[ə]	ə	ـۀ			ۀ	Ə ə	U+06C0
ye	[j], [i]	y, i	ـي	ـيـ	يـ	ي	Y y, I i	U+064A
ye	[e]	e	ـې	ـېـ	ېـ	ې	E e	U+06D0
ye	[ai], [j]	ay, y	ـی	ـ	ـ	ی	Ay ay, Y y	U+06CC
ye	[əi]	əi	ـئ	ـئـ	ئـ	ئ	Əi əi, Y y	U+0626

== Examples ==
Log will represent examples from the Ormuri dialect of Logar and kan will be used to signify the Kaniguram dialect of Ormuri

=== Log ===
- Afo kåbol-ki altsok. → 'He went off to Kabul.'
- A-saṛay dzok šuk. → '[This] man has been beaten.'
- Xodåay-an bad-e badtarin såton → 'O God, keep us from misfortune.' (lit. 'From the very worst.')

=== Kan ===
- A-nar by pa mun ǰoṛawak sa. → 'The house is being built by me.'
- Sabā su az kābul-ki tsom. → 'Tomorrow I shall probably go to Kabul.'
- Tsami a-dāru irwar! → 'Bring my eye drops!'

== Resources ==
- Ormuri Primer
- Qawaid e Bargistā (in Hindustani)
- The Ormuri Language in Past and Present
- Linguistic Survey of India (Volume 10): Ormuri at pages 123 to 325
- Indo-Iranian Frontier Languages (Volume 1): Parachi and Ormuri
- Clitics of Ormuri

== See also ==
- Ormur
- Waziri Pashto
- Parachi language
- Waneci
- Burki
- Baraki
- Logar Province
- Kaniguram
