= Parachi language =

Iranian language of Afghanistan

Parachi
- Native to: Afghanistan
- Region: Kabul
- Native speakers: 3,500 (2009)
- Language family: Indo-European: Indo-Iranian; Iranian; Ormuri–Parachi; Parachi
- Dialects: Ghujulan; Shutul; Nijrau

Language codes
- ISO 639-3: prc
- Glottolog: para1299
- ELP: Parachi
- Parachi is classified as Definitely Endangered by the UNESCO Atlas of the World's Languages in Danger

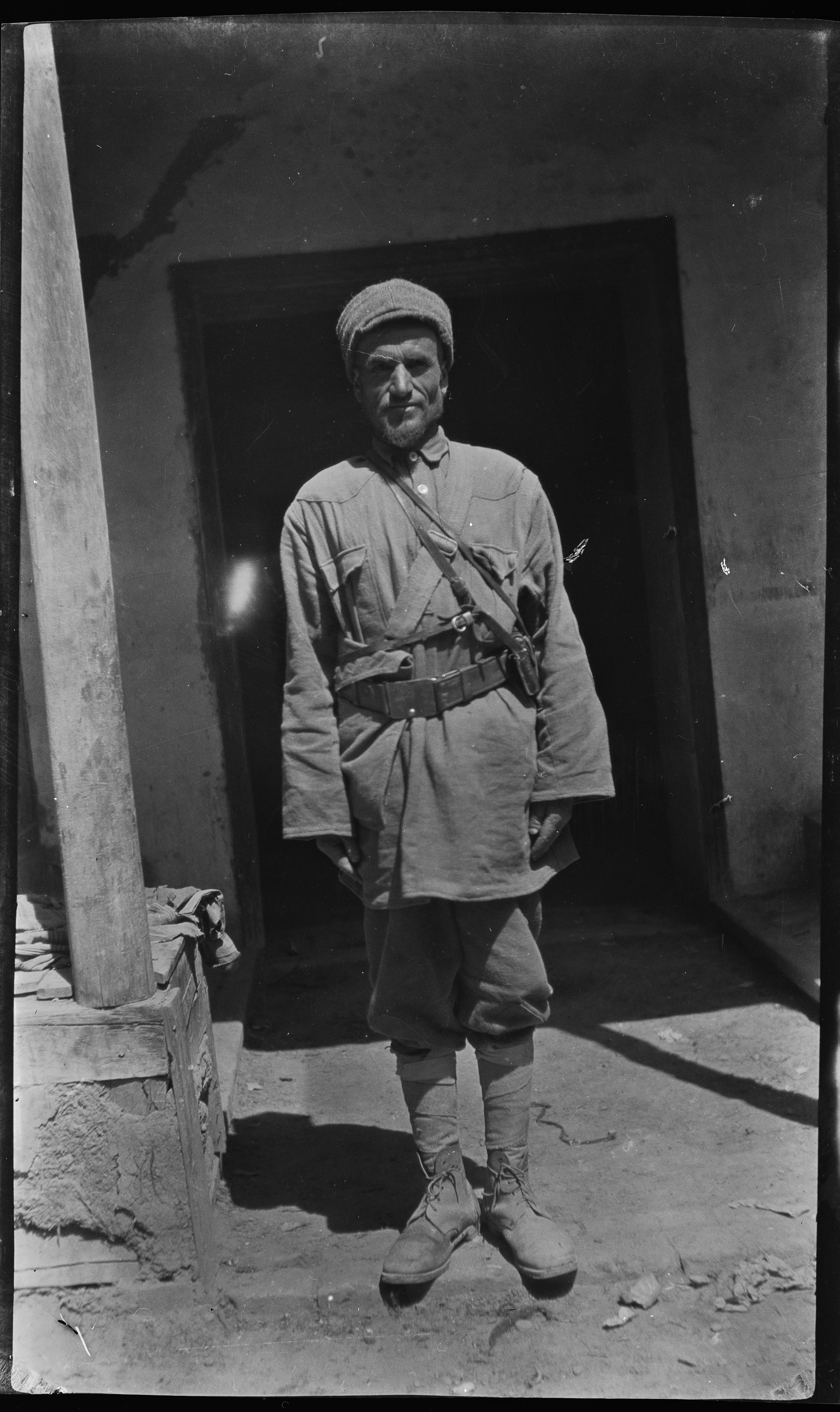
Ghulam Maheuddin, a Parachi man from Deh-i-Kal in Shutul valley, northeast of Charikar, photographed by Georg Morgenstierne in September 1924.

Parachi (Parāčī) is an Iranian language. Parachi is spoken by some 600 individuals of the Parachi ethnic group in eastern Afghanistan, mainly in the upper part of Nijrab District, northeast of Kabul, out of a total ethnic Parachi population of some 5,000.

It is closely related to the Ormuri language of Kaniguram in South Waziristan, Pakistan. Parachi is usually classified as a member of the Southeastern group of the Eastern Iranian languages, although this is an areal group rather than a genetical one.

== Classification ==
Parach is an Iranian language belonging to the Ormuri-Parachi subgroup. Glottolog classifies Parachi within the Ormuri-Parachi subgroup of Iranian languages. Similarly, Ethnologue also classifies it within the Ormur-Parachi subgroup, however, places both Parachi and Ormuri among the Norhwestern Iranian languages.

Despite being spoken in the eastern part of the Iranian language area, Parachi, similar to Ormuri, shares some common islogloss and linguistic and structural features with some Northwestern Iranian languages such as Zaza, Semnani, Sangsari.
