= Kaniguram =

Kaniguram کانیگورم کانیګورم
- Town
- Location within Khyber Pakhtunkhwa
- Coordinates: 32°31′N 69°47′E
- Country: Pakistan
- Province: Khyber Pakhtunkhwa
- District: South Waziristan
- Tehsil: Ladha Tehsil
- Elevation: 2,044 m (6,706 ft)

Population (2017)
  - Total: 13,809
- Time zone: UTC+5 (PST)

Kānīgūram (Pashto: کانيګورم) is a town in the South Waziristan region of Pakistan. Kaniguram's population mainly consists of the Ormur (Burki) tribe of Pashtuns.

It is also the hometown of the sixteenth-century Pashtun revolutionary leader and warrior-poet Bayazid Pir Roshan, who wrote the first known book of Pashto language.

According to the 2017 Census, Kaniguram has population of 13,809.

Today the locals in this town speak the Ormuri as well as the Waziristani (Maseedwola) dialect of Pashto.

== Language ==
Ormuri and Pashto (Masidwola) are spoken in Kaniguram; today, all Ormuri-speakers are also bilingual in the local Pashto dialect of Maseedwola. Most can also converse in Urdu and some in English. Burki are still found in Baraki Barak in Logar and outside Ghazni, Afghanistan; however, Pashto and Dari have replaced Ormuri language there.

== Transportation ==
Kaniguram is accessible from the north via the Razmak road and from the south from Wana on a narrow metalled road that is one of the few roads in South Waziristan. Access from this main "road" is limited to a suspension footbridge across a wide ravine that separates Kaniguram from the main road and is easy to guard, as behind it are mountains (Preghal and Jullundur) which limit access from the north. This footbridge has, more often than not, been unusable due to its poor infrastructure. The people of this settlement often have to climb down the steep ravine from the road during harsh winter months and then climb back up to the Kaniguram side.

== See also ==
- Kaniguram Valley
