= Himalayan Geothermal Belt =

- Geothermal belt
- Location: India, Nepal, China, Myanmar and Thailand

Dimensions
  - Length: 3,000 kilometres (1,900 mi)
  - Width: 150 kilometres (93 mi)

The Himalayan Geothermal Belt (HGB) is a region that extends for 3,000 kilometres (1,900 mi) through India, Tibet, Yunnan, Myanmar and Thailand, and that contains many geothermal fields.

== Location ==
The Himalayan Geothermal Belt was formed as a result of the collision of the Indian Plate with the Eurasian Plate, which created the Himalayas. The belt is more than 150 kilometres (93 mi) wide. The HGB has an extension to the westward that shows in warm or hot springs in the Peshawar region of Pakistan. These are clustered along the Main Karakoram Thrust, Main Mantle Thrust and Main Central Thrust. Some authors consider that the belt extends yet further west and should be called the Mediterranean-Himalayan Geothermal Belt.

== Mechanisms ==
Heat transfer in the HGB mainly occurs in "heat bands", 30 to 50 kilometres (19 to 31 mi) wide, within which there are at least 600 associated geothermal systems. These may be interpreted as segments of slip lines caused by deformation of the ductile crust in the Asian tectonic plate. In the eastern Himalayas the heat bands transfer two to three times as much heat as in the western Himalayas. This may be due to the Indian plate rotating in a counter-clockwise direction as it penetrates the Asian plate. The thermal waters in Tibet were thought to be meteoric in origin, and the heat source to be decaying radioactive nuclides. Due to studies in the 1990s and deep drilling results it is now thought that the heat source is granite that has remelted to magma due to the collision of the plates.

The warmest hot spring in the westward extension at 68 °C (154 °F) is the Garam Chashma Hot Springs, which emerge from in post-collisional leucogranites of the Hindu Kush Range that date from 20–18 Ma. Reservoir temperatures may be as high as 260 °C (500 °F). It is not clear whether the circulation of deep groundwater in this region is driven by topography or by tectonic lateral stress.

== Commercial potential ==
More than 150 of the geothermal fields have the potential to generate energy. There is a binary plant in Thailand that generates 300 kWe from 117 degrees C water. The Yangbajain Geothermal Field is in the Lhasa-Gangdise terrane. It is in an active part of a slip-fault zone of the Nyainqentanglha Mountains and fractured Himalayan granite. A shallow reservoir has temperatures up to 165 °C (329 °F), while a deep reservoir has temperatures up to 329 °C (624 °F). The first 1 MWe turbine came into operation in September 1977, and capacity had been increased to 25.18 MWe by 1991. As of 2007 another 7 MWe was being generated by seven small plants in Tibet and Yunnan.

== Sources ==
- Dor, Ji; Zhao, Ping (2000). "Characteristics and Genesis of the Yangbajing Geothermal Field, Tibet" (PDF). Proceedings World Geothermal Congress 2000.
- Eckstein, Yoram; Yousafza, M. Asim; Dahl, Peter S. (2007). "Western Extension of the Himalayan Geothermal Belt". GSA Denver Annual Meeting.
- "Himalayan Geothermal Belt". Geothermal Education Office. 1997-10-11.
- Hochstein, M.P.; Regenauer-Lieb, K. (July 1998). "Heat generation associated with collision of two plates: the Himalayan geothermal belt". Journal of Volcanology and Geothermal Research. 83 (1–2): 75–92. doi:10.1016/s0377-0273(98)00018-3.
- Shen, Xianjie (1996-12-01). Crust-Mantle Thermal Structure and Tectonothermal Evolution of the Tibetan Plateau. VSP. ISBN 978-90-6764-223-1.
