= Dorah Pass =

Mountain pass between Afghanistan and Pakistan

- Location within Afghanistan Location within Khyber Pakhtunkhwa Location within Pakistan
- Elevation: 4,300 metres (14,100 ft)

Third Approach
- Location: Afghanistan–Pakistan border
- Range: Hindu Kush
- Coordinates: 36°6′55″N 71°14′45″E

Dorah Pass, also called Durah Pass, connects Badakshan Province of Afghanistan with Lower Chitral District in Khyber Pakhtunkhwa, Pakistan. The Dorah Pass is more than 14,000 feet (4,300 m) high. It is located along the Durand Line border and crosses the Hindu Kush mountain range. Situated at the foot of the pass is Lake Dufferin, also known locally as Hawz-i Dorah. The lake is roughly 2 3/4 miles (4.4 km) long by over one-quarter mile (0.4 km) broad.

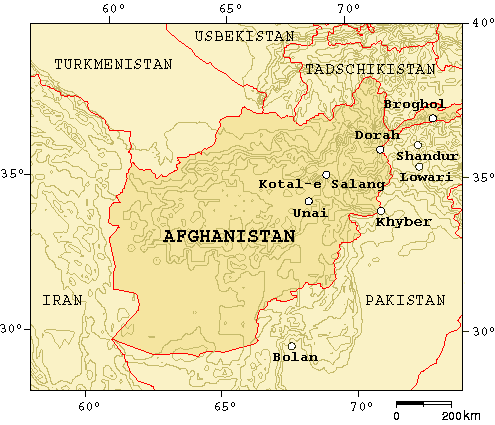
Mountain passes in the Hindu Kush region in and around Afghanistan

Dorah Pass became important during the Soviet invasion of Afghanistan because the Soviets were unable to stop the flow of arms and men back and forth across the pass. Almost the entire Munji-speaking population of Afghanistan fled across the border to Chitral during the War in Afghanistan. Dorah Pass is situated in the Pamir, a high plateau sometimes called "The roof of the world" that joins Pakistan, Afghanistan, Tajikistan, and China.

The Dorah Pass is one of the four major mountain passes that enter Chitral. The others are the Broghol Pass from the Wakhan District of Badakhshan, Afghanistan, Shandur Top from Gilgit, and Lowari Top from Upper Dir District.

== Books ==
- Morgenstierne, Georg (1926) Report on a Linguistic Mission to Afghanistan. Instituttet for Sammenlignende Kulturforskning, Serie C I-2. Oslo. ISBN 0-923891-09-9
