= Yidgha language =

Pamiri language spoken in Pakistan

Yidgha
- یدغا; Yidghā
- Native to: Chitral District, Pakistan
- Ethnicity: Yidgha
- Native speakers: 6,000 (2020)
- Language family: Indo-European: Indo-Iranian; Iranian; Southeastern; Shughni-Yazghulami-Munji; Munji-Yidgha; Yidgha
- Writing system: Arabic script (Nastaʿlīq)

Language codes
- ISO 639-3: ydg
- Glottolog: yidg1240
- ELP: Yidgha
- Linguasphere: 58-ABD-bb

The Yidgha language (یدغا زڤون) is an Eastern Iranian language of the Pamir group spoken in the upper Lotkoh Valley (Tehsil Lotkoh) of Chitral in the Khyber Pakhtunkhwa province of Pakistan. Yidgha is similar to the Munji language spoken on the Afghan side of the border.

The Garam Chashma area became important during the Soviet invasion of Afghanistan because the Soviets were unable to stop the flow of arms and men back and forth across the Dorah Pass that separates Chitral from Badakshan in Afghanistan. Almost the entire Munji-speaking population of Afghanistan fled across the border to Chitral during the War in Afghanistan.

== Name ==
According to Georg Morgenstierne (1931), the name Yidgha probably derives from *(h)ind(a,i)-ka-, likely referring to the part of the Munji tribe that settled on the "Indian" or "Indo-Aryan" side near the Lotkoh Valley. Ľubomír Novák (2013) revises the reconstruction as *hindū̆-ka-ka-, with the same assumption.

== Alphabet ==
Yidgha uses the Arabic script. The Yidgha alphabet has 45 letters and is based on the Urdu alphabet. Retroflexes that don't exist in Urdu have been borrowed from the Khowar alphabet. The Yidgha alphabet is unusual among Pakistani alphabets as it places the letters ٹ after ث and ڈ after ذ, unlike in Urdu. Alveolar affricate letters ts and dz were borrowed from the Pashto alphabet. It also places the letter ڤ after ق.

=== Letters ===
Yidgha alphabet
Letter	Name	Latin transcription	IPA	Notes
ا	الف (Alif)	/ Ā ā	/ aː	The letter Alif has two functions: first: as a vowel carrier for vowels at the beginning of a word. Second: to represent the aː (ā) vowel in the middle or end of a word (at the beginning آ is used).
ب	بے (Be)	B b	/b/	
پ	پے (Pe)	P p	/p/	
ت	تے (Te)	T t	/t/	
ث	ثے (Se)	S s	/s/	Used only in Arabic / Persian loanwords
ٹ	ٹے (Ṭe)	Ṭ ṭ	/ʈ/	
ج	جیم (J̌īm)	J̌ ǰ	/dʒ/	
چ	چیم (Če/Čīm)	Č č	/tʃ/	
ح	حے (He)	H h	/h/	Used in Arabic / Persian loanwords
خ	خے (Xe)	X x	/x/	
ݯ	ݯے (C̣e)	C̣ c̣	/ ʈʂ /	Borrowed from Khowar
ݮ	ݮے (J̣e)	J̣ j̣	/ ɖʐ /	Borrowed from Khowar (in Khowar it is called ݮیم)
څ	څے (Ce)	C c	/ts/	Borrowed from Pashto
ځ	ځے (Je)	J j	/dz/	Borrowed from Pashto (in Pashto it is called ځيم)
د	دال (Dāl)	D d	/d/	
ذ	ذال (Zāl)	Z z	/z/	Only used in Arabic / Persian loanwords
ڈ	ڈال (Ḍal)	Ḍ ḍ	/ɖ/	
ر	رے (Re)	R r	/ɾ~r/	
ڑ	ڑے (Ṛe)	Ṛ ṛ	/ɽ/	
ز	زے (Ze)	Z z	/z/	
ژ	ژے (Že)	Ž ž	/ʒ/	
ݱ	ݱے (Ẓe)	Ẓ ẓ	/ʐ/	Borrowed from Khowar
س	سین (Sīn)	S s	/s/	
ش	شین (Šīn)	Š š	/ʃ/	
ݰ	ݰین (Ṣīn)	Ṣ ṣ	/ʂ/	Borrowed from Khowar
ص	صواد (Swād)	S s	/s/	Only used in Arabic / Persian loanwords
ض	ضواد (Zwād)	Z z	/z/	Only used in Arabic / Persian loanwords
ط	طوے (Toe)	T t	/t/	Only used in Arabic / Persian loanwords
ظ	ظوے (Zoe)	Z z	/z/	Only used in Arabic / Persian loanwords
ع	عین (ʔayn)	ʔ	/ʔ/	Used in Arabic / Persian loanwords
غ	غین (Ǧayn)	Ǧ ǧ	/ɣ/	
ف	فے (Fe)	F f	/f/	
ق	قاف (Qāf)	Q q	/q/	
ڤ	ڤے (Ve)	V v	/v/	
ک	کاف (Kāf)	K k	/k/	
ګ	ګاف (Ŋāf)	Ŋ ŋ	/ŋ/	Borrowed from Pashto (in Pashto it represents /ɡ/)
گ	گاف (Gāf)	G g	/ɡ/	
ل	لام (Lām)	L l	/l/	
م	میم (Mīm)	M m	/m/	
ن	نون (Nūn)	N n	/n/	
و	واو (Wāw)	W w / Ū ū / O o	/w/, /uː/, /oː/	The letter Wāw has three functions: first, it represents the /w/ sound. Second, it represents the /uː/ sound if preceded by an optional Peš (Damma) diacritic, always preceded by ا at the beginning of word. Third: it represents the /oː/ vowel if preceded by no diacritic (always preceded by ا at the beginning of word). At the beginning of word و always represents /w/.
ہ	چھوٹی ہے (Čhoṭī He)	H h, A a, I i, U u	/h/, /a/, /i/, /u/	At the beginning or middle of word it represents the h sound. At the end of word it is used for short vowels a i u, preceded by optional diacritics. The do čašme he ھ is not used in Yidgha and not part of the alphabet but appears only in the names of the letters ہ ی in the word چھوٹی as the names are the same as in Urdu.
ء	ہمزہ (Hamza)	ʔ	/ʔ/	Used for glottal stop in vowel sequences
ی	چھوٹی یے (Čhoṭī Ye)	Y y, Ī ī, E e	/j/, /iː/, /eː/	The letter Čhoṭī Ye has 3 functions: first, it represents the /j/ sound. Second, it represents the long /iː/ vowel if preceded by an optional Zer diacritic always preceded by ا at beginning of word. Third, it represents the/eː/ vowel without any diacritic always preceded by ا at the beginning of word. The ی always represents /j/.
ے	بڑی یے (Baṛī Ye)	E e	/eː/	Used at the end of word for the vowel /eː/, in the middle of word it is written ی and at the beginning of word as ای.

=== Vowels ===
Yidgha language has 8 vowels: A a (/a/), Ā ā (/aː/), I i (/i/), Ī (/iː/), U u (/u/), Ū ū (/uː/), E e (/eː/) and O o (/oː/). The rules for writing vowels are same as in the Urdu alphabet, short vowels at the end of word are written with the 3 vowel diacritics followed by ہ, and the combinations of Zabar + ye (َی) and zabar + wāw (َو) are read as /aj/ and /aw/ and not as single vowels like in Urdu.

== Study ==
The Yidgha language has not been given serious study by linguists, except that it is mentioned by Georg Morgenstierne (1926), Kendall Decker (1992) and Badshah Munir Bukhari (2005). A 280-page joint description of Yidgha and Munji (descriptive and historical phonetics and grammar, glossary with etymologies where possible) is given by Morgenstierne (1938).

Norwegian linguist Georg Morgenstierne wrote that Chitral is the area of the greatest linguistic diversity in the world.The goat sacrifice 1929 Although Khowar is the predominant language of Chitral, more than ten other languages are spoken here. These include Kalasha-mun, Palula, Dameli, Gawar-Bati, Nuristani, Yidgha, Burushaski, Wakhi, Kyrgyz, the Madaglashti dialect of Persian, and Pashto. Since many of these languages have no written form, letters are usually written in Urdu, a modified script adapted from Persian. Yidgha is considered an endangered language.

== See also ==
- Languages of Pakistan
