= Munji language =

Iranian language spoken in Afghanistan

Munji
- منجاني ألڤزأن; Munjoni ālavzān
- Munjoni in Perso-Arabic script
- Native to: Badakhshan Province, Afghanistan
- Ethnicity: Munji
- Native speakers: 5,300 (2008)
- Language family: Indo-European: Indo-Iranian; Iranian; Southeastern; Shughni-Yazghulami-Munji; Munji-Yidgha; Munji
- Writing system: Perso-Arabic script

Language codes
- ISO 639-3: mnj
- Glottolog: munj1244
- ELP: Munji
- Linguasphere: 58-ABD-ba
- Munji is classified as Severely endangered by the UNESCO Atlas of the World's Languages in Danger (2010)

The Munji language (Persian: مونجی, Pashto: مونجی), also known as Munjani (Persian: مونجانی, Pashto: مونجی ژبه, Munji: منجاني ألڤزأن), Munjhan (مونجهان), and the Munjiwar language, is a Pamir language spoken in the Munjan valley in the Kuran wa Munjan district of the Badakhshan province in northeast Afghanistan. It is similar to the Yidgha language, which is spoken in the Upper Lotkoh Valley of Chitral, west of Garam Chashma in Khyber Pakhtunkhwa, Pakistan.

== Speakers ==
The Garam Chashma area became important during the Soviet–Afghan War. During the invasion, the Soviets were unable to stop the flow of arms and men back and forth across the Dorah Pass that separates Chitral, in Pakistan, from Badakshan in Afghanistan. The two dialects spoken in the area of Mamalgha Valley and the area of Munjan Valley differed, being the northern and southern dialects. The language has moved to parts of Chitral, after the War in Afghanistan forced the Munji-speaking people to flee to safer areas. Despite Dari being the predominant language of the region, attitudes towards Munji are highly positive, and among speakers, few predict a decline in use.

== Classification ==
Glottolog classifies the Munji language as a Central Eastern Iranian language belonging to the Yidgha-Munji subgroup. Historically, Munji displays the closest possible linguistic affinity with the now-extinct Bactrian language.

== Grammar ==
Munji has partially preserved the Proto-Iranian grammatical gender system, maintaining the distinction between masculine and feminine. Although spoken in the easternmost periphery of the Iranian linguistic area, Munji marks the plural with the suffix -i, mirroring a morphological feature found in Zaza and Semnani, which are two Northwestern Iranian languages.

=== Numerals ===
Munji numerals
	one	two	three	four	five	six	seven	eight	nine	ten	twenty
Munji	yū	lu	x̌'rori	čfur	ponž	oxšo	ovdo	oško	nāv	da	bīst/wīst
Yidga	yū	loh	x̌'urori	čšīr	panš	oxšo	avdo	oščo	nōu	los	wīsto

== Phonology ==
Munji Consonants
		Labial	Dental/ Alveolar	Post-alv.	Retroflex	Palatal	Velar	Uvular	Glottal
Nasal		m	n			ɲ			
Stop	voiceless	p	t		ʈ	c	k	q	
Stop	voiced	b	d		ɖ	ɟ	ɡ		
Affricate	voiceless		t͡s	t͡ʃ	t͡ʂ				
Affricate	voiced		d͡z	d͡ʒ	d͡ʐ				
Fricative	voiceless	f	s	ʃ	ʂ	ç	x	χ	h
Fricative	voiced	v	z	ʒ	ʐ	ʝ			
Approximant			l			j	w		
Tap/Trill			r		ɽ				

=== Vowels ===
Munji language has 8 vowel phonemes, these are [ə], [a], [ɔ], [ʊ], [u], [ɪ], [ɛ], [i]. Five of these vowels are lengthened in pronunciation, [i], [u], [ɛ], [ɔ], [a]. And the three central vowels [ɪ], [ʊ], [ə] are pronounced as short. The short vowels are neutralized in unstressed syllables, so that even native speakers are not aware of which specific vowel they are using.

As for orthography, native Munji words that have the 5 long vowels, these vowels are written with explicit letters, as defined in orthographic conventions of Munji. The three short vowels are written using diacritics which are dropped in most cases. Loanwords entering Munji via Persian (Dari) are written as they would in Persian.

Munji Vowels
	Front	Central	Back
Close	i		u
Near-close	ɪ		ʊ
Mid	ɛ	ə	ɔ
Open		ä	

== Orthography ==
Attempts at compiling and standardizing an alphabet for Munji was first started in 2010. Samar linguistic institute, the Afghan branch of SIL International, an organization dedicated to preservation of language and development of literacy, has compiled a standardized orthography and various educational and linguistic material on Munji language. In 2017, the Munji orthography was given official confirmation by the Academy of Sciences of Afghanistan, Afghanistan's official language regulator.

The alphabet is derived from Persian alphabet, but consists of 10 additional letters. Some of these letters are to represent phonemes that do not exist in Persian (Dari), while others are to clarify and specify vowel and consonant phonemes for better clarity and less ambiguity.

Transliteration	IPA	Forms				Unicode	Notes
Transliteration	IPA	Isolated	Final	Medial	Initial	Unicode	Notes
O o	[ɔ]	آ / ا	ـا	-	آ	U+0622; U+0627	Vowel phoneme [ɔ] is represented with (آ) when at the beginning of a word, and with (ـا / ا) when in the middle or end of a word.
Ā ā	[ä]	أ	ـأ	-	أ	U+0623	Unique to Munji, not used as such in Persian (Dari). Similar letter exists in Turkmen orthography. Vowel phoneme [ä] is represented with (أ / ـأ) whether at the beginning, middle, or end of a word.
/ A a / U u / I i	[∅] ([ə][ʊ][ɪ])	ا	-	-	ا	U+0627	Letter alif at the beginning of a word can serve two functions. First, it precedes vowel letters (اؤ) [u], (ایـ / اي) [i], or (اېـ / اې) [ɛ]. Second, it acts as a vowel carrier for diacritics of the three short vowels of Munji, اَ [ə], (اُ) [ʊ], and (اِ) [ɪ].
B b	[b]	ب	ـب	ـبـ	بـ	U+0628	
P p	[p]	پ	ـپ	ـپـ	پـ	U+067e	
T t	[t]~[tʰ]	ت	ـت	ـتـ	تـ	U+062a	
S s	[s]	ث	ـث	ـثـ	ثـ	U+062b	Only used in loanwords of Arabic origin.
J̌ ǰ	[d͡ʒ]	ج	ـج	ـجـ	جـ	U+062c	
Č č	[t͡ʃ]	چ	ـچ	ـچـ	چـ	U+0686	
H h	[h]~[ʔ]	ح	ـح	ـحـ	حـ	U+062d	Only used in loanwords of Arabic origin.
X x	[x]	خ	ـخ	ـخـ	خـ	U+062e	
C c	[t͡s]	څ	ـڅ	ـڅـ	څـ	U+0685	Unique to Munji, not part of Persian (Dari) alphabet. Similar letter exists in Pashto, Khowar, Shughni, and Wakhani orthographies.
J j	[d͡z]	ځ	ـځ	ـځـ	ځـ	U+0681	Unique to Munji, not part of Persian (Dari) alphabet. Similar letter exists in Pashto, Khowar, Shughni, and Wakhani orthographies.
D d	[d]~[dʱ]	د	ـد	-	-	U+062f	
Z z	[z]	ذ	ـذ	-	-	U+0630	Only used in loanwords of Arabic origin.
R r	[ɾ]	ر	ـر	-	-	U+0631	
Z z	[z]	ز	ـز	-	-	U+0632	
Ž ž	[ʒ]~[ʐ]	ژ	ـژ	-	-	U+0698	
Ǧ ǧ	[ʝ]	ږ	ـږ	-	-	U+0696	Unique to Munji, not part of Persian (Dari) alphabet. Similar letter exists in Pashto, Shughni, and Wakhani orthographies.
S s	[s]	س	ـس	ـسـ	سـ	U+0633	
Š š	[ʃ]‍~[ʂ]	ش	ـش	ـشـ	شـ	U+0634	
X̌ x̌	[ç]	ښ	ـښ	ـښـ	ښـ	U+069a	Unique to Munji, not part of Persian (Dari) alphabet. Similar letter exists in Pashto, Shughni, and Wakhani orthographies.
S s	[s]	ص	ـص	ـصـ	صـ	U+0635	Only used in loanwords of Arabic origin.
Z z	[z]	ض	ـض	ـضـ	ضـ	U+0636	Only used in loanwords of Arabic origin.
T t	[t]	ط	ـط	ـطـ	طـ	U+0637U	Only used in loanwords of Arabic origin.
Z z	[z]	ظ	ـظ	ـظـ	ظـ	U+0638	Only used in loanwords of Arabic origin.
-	[∅]/[ʔ]	ع	ـع	ـعـ	عـ	U+0639	Only used in loanwords of Arabic origin.
Gh gh	[ɣ]	غ	ـغ	ـغـ	غـ	U+063a	
F f	[f]	ف	ـف	ـفـ	فـ	U+0641	
V v	[v]	ڤ	ـڤ	ـڤـ	ڤـ	U+06a4	Unique to Munji, not part of Persian (Dari) alphabet. Similar letter exists in Shughni, Wakhani, and other orthographies beyond Afghanistan, such as Kurdish.
Q q	[q]	ق	ـق	ـقـ	قـ	U+0642	
K k	[k]	ک	ـک	ـکـ	کـ	U+06a9	
Ḱ ḱ	[cʲ]~[c͡ç]	ݢ	ـݢ	ـݢـ	ݢـ	U+0762	Unique to Munji, not part of Persian (Dari) alphabet. No similar letter exists in any other orthography.
G g	[ɡ]	گ	ـگ	ـگـ	گـ	U+06af	
Ǵ ǵ	[ɟʲ]~[ɟ͡ʝ]	ڱ	ـڱ	ـڱـ	ڱـ	U+06B1	Unique to Munji, not part of Persian (Dari) alphabet. No similar letter exists in any other orthography.
L l	[l]	ل	ـل	ـلـ	لـ	U+0644	
M m	[m]	م	ـم	ـمـ	مـ	U+0645	
N n	[n]	ن	ـن	ـنـ	نـ	U+0646	
W w	[w]	و	ـو	-	-	U+0648	
Ū ū	[u]	ؤ	ـؤ	-	اؤ	U+0624	Unique to Munji, not used as such in Persian (Dari). Indicates a vowel, and when a word begins with this vowel phoneme, the letter needs to be preceded by alif (اؤ).
H h	[h]~[ʔ]	ه	ـه	ـهـ	هـ	U+0647	
A a	[ə]	ه	ـه	-	-	U+0647	Only at the end of the word does this letter represent vowel phoneme [ə]. In the middle of words, this vowel is represented with diacritic (ـَ) which is usually dropped in writing. At the beginning of a word, the diacritic is placed on top of alif (اَ)
I i / Y y	[i] / [j]	ی	-	ـیـ	ایـ / یـ	U+06cc	Represents two phonemes based on context, [i] and [j]. If used at the beginning of a word, if representing consonant [j], it will be written standalone یـ, if representing a vowel [i], it will be preceded by alif ایـ. Not used at the end of the word. Instead, either ( ۍ) or ( ي) are used for representing the phonemes [j] or [i] respectively.
Y y	[j]	ۍ	ـۍ	-	-	U+06CD	Unique to Munji, not part of Persian (Dari) alphabet. Similar letter exists in Pashto orthography. This letter is only used at the end of a word to represent the phoneme [j]. Elsewhere in a word, the letter ye یـ / ـیـ is used.
I i	[i]	ي	ـي	-	-	U+064A	Unique to Munji, not part of Persian (Dari) alphabet. Similar letter exists in Pashto orthography. This letter is only used at the end of a word to represent the phoneme [i]. Elsewhere in a word, the letter ye ( ایـ / یـ / ـیـ) is used.
E e	[ɛ]	ې	ـې	ـېـ	اېـ / ېـ	U+06d0	Unique to Munji, not part of Persian (Dari). Similar letter exists in Pashto and Uzbek orthographies. Indicates a vowel, and when a word begins with this vowel phoneme, the letter needs to be preceded by alif (اېـ).

=== Vowels ===
Munji language has 8 vowel phonemes, these are A a [ə], Ā ā [a], O o [ɔ], U u [ʊ], Ū ū [u], Ə ə [ɪ], E e [ɛ], I i[i]. Five of these vowels are lengthened in pronunciation, [i], [u], [ɛ], [ɔ], [a]. And the three central vowels [ɪ], [ʊ], [ə] are pronounced as short.

As for orthography, native Munji words that have the 5 long vowels, these vowels are written with explicit letters, as defined in orthographic conventions of Munji. The three short vowels are written using diacritics which are dropped in most cases. Loanwords entering Munji via Persian (Dari) (which can be native Persian words, or Arabic or Turkic or European words) are written as they would in Persian.

A a	Ā ā	O o	U u	Ū ū	Ə ə	E e	I i
[ə]	[a]	[ɔ]	[ʊ]	[u]	[ɪ]	[ɛ]	[i]
Vowels at the beginning of a word
اَ / ا	أ	آ	اُ / ا	اؤ	اِ / ا	اېـ	ایـ
Vowels at the middle of a word
◌َ	أ / ـأ	ا / ـا	◌ُ	ؤ / ـؤ	◌ِ	ېـ / ـېـ	یـ / ـیـ
Vowels at the end of a word
ه / ـه	أ / ـأ	ا / ـا	-	ؤ / ـؤ	-	ې / ـې	ي / ـي

=== Text sample ===
Below is a short passage of sample phrases.

Munji Arabic Alphabet	أمینڱه جاند یؤ میوه به مزغه أست. نه صحتأن نه انسانأن جاند فایده لېت. ژه أمینڱین باید زیاد استفاده کنأم خصوصاً وختیکه وه ژنکي غارگي فرمأت باید زیاد خرأت. ڤه أمینڱه مݢي مردم بالرأت. واقعاً یؤ میوه بالزته أست.	
Latin Transliteration	Āminǵa jond yū məwa ba mazgha āst. Na səhatān na insonān jond foyda let. Ža āminǵin boyad zəyod əstəfoda kunām xusūson waxtika wažanki ghogi farmāj boyad zəyod xurāt. Va āminǵa maḱi mardum bolrāt. woqə’on yū məwa bolzəta āst.	
Translation	"The āminǵa (apricot?) is a very tasty fruit. It is beneficial for human health. We should use it a lot, especially when one is very hungry, one should eat a lot of it. And āminǵa increases people's strength. Truly, it is a most excellent fruit."	-
