= Ivan Zarubin =

Soviet linguist and Iranist (1887–1964)

Ivan Ivanovich Zarubin (Russian: Иван Иванович Зарубин; 27 September 1887 – 3 February 1964) was a Soviet specialist of Iranian languages, particularly Pamir languages.

== Life ==
Zarubin was born in 1887. He wrote dozens of books on Iranian languages and was the leading authority in the Soviet Union of the Pamir languages spoken in Gorno-Badakhshan Autonomous Oblast in the Tajik SSR. He was a professor at Leningrad University, a position he held until 1949, and was director of the Department of the Near East and Central Asia at the Kunstkamera in Leningrad.

In the summer of 1914, Zarubin, together with a French Iranist Robert Gauthiot, traveled to the Pamir Mountains and conducted linguistic and ethnographic research. Over the coming decades, Zarubin continued to conduct linguistic, folkloric and ethnographic studies in the Pamirs and elsewhere in Central Asia. One of his greatest achievements was the 1926–30 Central Asian ethnological expedition on behalf of the Academy of Sciences.

A large portion of the Pamir collection at the Kunstkamera's Department of the Near East and Central Asia was acquired during Zarubin's work in the Pamirs in 1914. Zarubin usually published his works under the named I. I. Zarubin.

Zarubin died in 1964.

== Selected bibliography ==
- Spisok narodnostej Turkestanskogo kraja. Leningrad, Rossijskaja Akademija nauk, 1925.
- Naselenie Samarkandskoj oblasti. Ego čislennost', etnografičeskij sostav i territorial'noe raspredelenie (po materialam sel'sko-hozajstvennoj perepisi 1917 g., popolnennoj drugimi istočnikami). Leningrad, Akademija nauk S.S.S.R., 1926.
- Naselenie samarkandskoĭ oblasti: ego chislennostʹ, ėtnograficheskiĭ sostav i territorialʹnoe raspredelenie: po materialam selʹsko-khozi︠a︡ĭsvennoĭ perepisi 1917 g., popolenennoĭ drugimi istochnikami. Izd-vo Akademii nauk SSSR, 1926.
- Spisok narodnosteĭ Soi︠u︡za Sovetskikh Sot︠s︡ialisticheskikh Respublik. Leningrad: Izd-vo Akademii nauk SSSR, 1927.
- K kharakteristike mundihanskogo iazyka. Leningrad, 1927.
- Vershikskoe narechie kandzhutskogo yazyka: Le dialecte Vershik de la langue Kandjoute. Leningrad: Izdatel'stvo Akademii Nauk SSSR, 1927.
- Odna oroshorskai︠a︡ skazka. Leningrad: Izd. Instituta zhivykh vostochnykh i︠a︡zykov im. A.S. Enukizde, 1927.
- Veršikskoe narečie kandžutskogo jazyka = Le dialecte Vershik de la langue Kandjoute. Leningrad: Izdat. Akademii Nauk SSSR, 1927.
- Očerk razgovornogo jazyka Samarkandskich evreev = Précis de la langue parlée des juits de Samarkand: opyt charakteristiki, materially. Leningrad: Akad. Nauk SSSR, 1928.
- "K izucheniiu beludzhskogo iazyka i fol’klora." Zapiski Kollegii vostokovedov pri Aziatskom muzee AN SSSR, 1930, no. 5.
- Orosorskie teksty i slovar. Leningrad: Izd. Akademii nauk SSSR, 1930.
- Beludzhskie skazki. Leningrad: Izd-vo Akad. nauk SSSR, 1932.
- Slovo Danila Zatočnika: po redakcijam XII i XIII vv. i ich peredelkam. Publisher: Leningrad, 1932. co-written with Daniil Zatočnik.
- Two Yazghulāmī Texts. Bulletin of the School of Oriental Studies, University of London, 1936, vol. 8, no. 2/3, pp. 875–881.
- Bartangskie i rushanskie teksty i slovar. Moskva: Izd-vo Akademii nauk SSSR, 1937.
- Shugnanskie teksty i slovar. Moskva: Izd-vo Akademii nauk SSSR, 1960.
- Iranskij sbornik: K semidesjatiletiju. Moskva: Izd-vo vostočnoj lit, 1963.
- Proizvodstvenno-ekonomicheskie sviazi i ikh plannrovanie: (Metod. sovety lektoram i prepodavatelia︡m ėkon. fak. nar. un-tov tekhn. progressa). Donetsk, 1969.
- Na leninskikh printsipakh. Tula: Priokskoe kn. izd-vo, 1974.
- Svod Zakonov RSFSR / Tom 1. Moskva: Sovetskaja Rossija, 1983. co-written with Vladimir Michajlovič Blinov and Ch P Neškov.
