= Munj, Kohgiluyeh and Boyer-Ahmad =

Munj مونج
- Village
- Location within Iran
- Coordinates: 31°09′09″N 51°06′47″E
- Country: Iran
- Province: Kohgiluyeh and Boyer-Ahmad
- County: Dana
- Bakhsh: Pataveh
- Rural District: Sadat Mahmudi

Population (2006)
  - Total: 343
- Time zone: UTC+3:30 (IRST)
  - Summer (DST): UTC+4:30 (IRDT)

Munj (Persian: مونج, also Romanized as Mūnj; also known as Monj) is a village in Sadat Mahmudi Rural District, Pataveh District, Dana County, Kohgiluyeh and Boyer-Ahmad Province, Iran. At the 2006 census, its population was 343, in 64 families.
