= Eastern Iranian languages =

Subgroup of the Iranian languages

Eastern Iranian
- Eastern Iranic
- Geographic distribution: West Asia, Central Asia, South Asia, Caucasus
- Linguistic classification: Indo-European: Indo-Iranian; Iranian; Eastern Iranian
- Subdivisions: Sogdo-Scythian; Saka–Wakhi; Shughni–Yidgha; Sanglechi–Ishkashimi; Pashto–Wanetsi; Ormuri–Parachi; Bactrian †; Kambojan? †

Language codes
- Glottolog: east2704

Distribution of the Iranian languages in and around the Iranian plateau. Eastern Iranian languages are indicated in the key.

The Eastern Iranian languages or Eastern Iranic languages are an areal subgroup of the Iranian languages, having emerged during the Middle Iranian era (4th century BC to 9th century AD). The Avestan language is often classified as early Eastern Iranian. As opposed to the Middle-era Western Iranian dialects, the Middle-era Eastern Iranian dialects preserve word-final syllables.

The largest living Eastern Iranian language is Pashto, with 40 to 60 million speakers between the Amu River in Afghanistan and the Indus River in Pakistan. The second-largest living Eastern Iranian language is Ossetic, with roughly 600,000 speakers across Ossetia (split between Georgia and Russia). All other languages of the Eastern Iranian subgroup have fewer than 200,000 speakers combined.

Most living Eastern Iranian languages are spoken in a contiguous area: southern and eastern Afghanistan and the adjacent parts of western Pakistan; the Badakhshan Mountainous Autonomous Region in eastern Tajikistan; and the westernmost parts of Xinjiang Uyghur Autonomous Region in western China. There are also two living members in widely separated areas: the Yaghnobi language of northwestern Tajikistan (descended from Sogdian); and the Ossetic language of the Caucasus (descended from Scytho-Sarmatian and is hence classified as Eastern Iranian despite its location). These are remnants of a vast ethno-linguistic continuum that stretched over most of Central Asia, parts of the Caucasus, Eastern Europe, and Western Asia in the 1st millennium BC — an area otherwise known as Scythia. The large Eastern Iranian continuum in Eastern Europe would continue up to the 4th century AD, with the successors of the Scythians, namely the Sarmatians.

== History ==
Western Iranian is thought to have separated from Proto-Iranian in the course of the later 2nd millennium BC not long after Avestan, possibly occurring in the Yaz culture. Eastern Iranian followed suit, and developed in place of Proto-Iranian, spoken within the Andronovo horizon.

Due to the Greek presence in Central Asia, some of the easternmost of these languages were recorded in their Middle Iranian stage (hence the "Eastern" classification), while almost no records of the Scytho-Sarmatian continuum stretching from Kazakhstan west across the Pontic steppe to Ukraine have survived. Some authors find that the Eastern Iranian people had an influence on Russian folk culture.

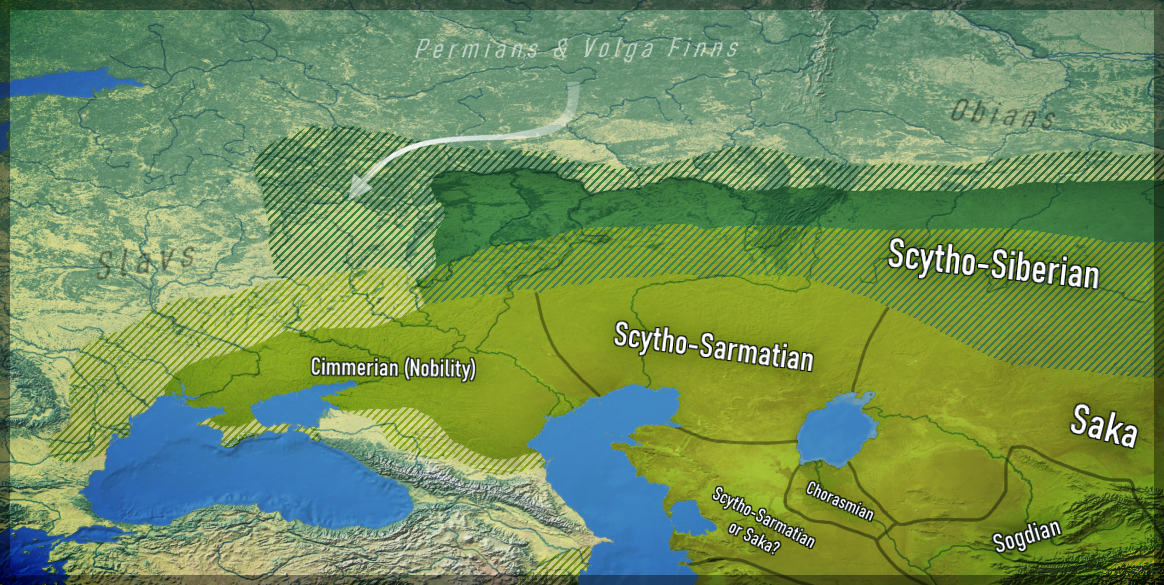
Map of Northeastern Iranic populations in Central Asia during the Iron Age. Highlighted in green.

Middle Persian/Dari spread around the Oxus River region, Afghanistan, and Khorasan after the Arab conquests and during Islamic-Arab rule. The replacement of the Pahlavi script with the Arabic script in order to write the Persian language was done by the Tahirids in 9th century Khorasan. The Persian Dari language spread, leading to the extinction of Eastern Iranic languages including Bactrian and Khorezmian. Only a few speakers of the Sogdian-descended Yaghnobi remain among the largely Persian-speaking Tajik population of Central Asia. This appears to be due to the large numbers of Persian-speakers in Arab-Islamic armies that invaded Central Asia and later Muslim governments in the region such as the Samanids. Persian was rooted into Central Asia by the Samanids.

== Classification ==
Eastern Iranian remains in large part a dialect continuum subject to common innovation. Traditional branches, such as "Northeastern", as well as Eastern Iranian itself, are better considered language areas rather than genetic groups.

The languages are as follows:

Old Iranian period

- Northeast: Scythian, Old Saka, etc.
- Central Iranian: Avestan (c. 1000 – 7th century BC)

Avestan is sometimes classified as Eastern Iranian, but is not assigned to a branch in 21st-century classifications.

Middle Iranian period

- Bactrian, c. 4th century BC – 9th century AD
- Khwarezmian (Chorasmian) c. 4th century BC – 13th century AD
- Sogdian, from c. the 4th century AD
- Scytho-Khotanese (Saka) (c. 5th century – 10th century AD) and Tumshuqese (formerly Maralbashi, 7th century AD)
- Scytho-Sarmatian, from c. the 8th century BC

Family tree

The following classification cites Nóvak (2013, 2014) and Glottolog 5.3.

- Eastern Iranian (sprachbund)
  - Sogdo-Scythian
    - Scythian
      - Cimmerian †
      - Pontic Scythian †
      - Sarmatian
        - Alanic
          - Jassic †
          - Ossetian
    - Sogdic
      - Khwarezmian †
      - Sogdian–Yaghnobi
        - Sogdian †
        - Yaghnobi
  - Saka–Wakhi
    - Saka †
    - Wakhi
  - Shughni–Yidgha
    - Shughni–Yazghulami
      - Shughnic
        - Shughni
        - Sarikoli
        - Vanji †
      - Yazghulami
    - Munji–Yidgha
      - Munji
      - Yidgha
  - Sanglechi–Ishkashimi
    - Sanglechi
    - Ishkashimi
  - Pashto–Wanetsi
    - Pashto
    - Wanetsi
  - Ormuri–Parachi
    - Ormuri
    - Parachi
  - Bactrian †

== Characteristics ==
The Eastern Iranian area has been affected by widespread sound changes, e.g. t͡ʃ > ts.

| English | Avestan | Pashto | Munji | Sanglechi | Wakhi | Shughni | Parachi | Ormuri | Yaghnobi | Ossetic |
|---|---|---|---|---|---|---|---|---|---|---|
| one | aēva- | yaw | yu | vak | yi | yiw | žu | sō | ī | iu |
| four | t͡ʃaθwārō | tsalṓr | t͡ʃfūr | tsəfúr | tsībɨr | tsavṓr | t͡ʃōr | tsār | (tafṓr)^{1} | cyppar |
| seven | hapta | ōwə | ōvda | ōvδ | ɨb | ūvd | hōt | wō | aft | avd |

1. The initial syllable was in this word lost entirely in Yaghnobi due to a stress shift.

=== Lenition of voiced stops ===
Common to most Eastern Iranian languages is a particularly widespread lenition of the voiced stops *b, *d, *g. Between vowels, these have been lenited also in most Western Iranian languages, but in Eastern Iranian, spirantization also generally occurs in the word-initial position. This phenomenon is however not apparent in Avestan, and remains absent from Ormuri-Parachi.

A series of spirant consonants can be assumed to have been the first stage: *b > *β, *d > *ð, *g > *ɣ. The voiced velar fricative /ɣ/ has mostly been preserved. The labial member has been well-preserved too, but in most languages has shifted from a voiced bilabial fricative /β/ to the voiced labiodental fricative /v/. The dental member has proved the most unstable: while a voiced dental fricative /ð/ is preserved in some Pamir languages, it has in e.g. Pashto and Munji lenited further to /l/. On the other hand, in Yaghnobi and Ossetian, the development appears to have been reversed, leading to the reappearance of a voiced stop /d/. (Both languages have also shifted earlier *θ > /t/.)

| English | Avestan | Pashto | Munji | Sanglechi | Wakhi | Shughni | Parachi | Ormuri | Yaghnobi | Ossetic |
|---|---|---|---|---|---|---|---|---|---|---|
| ten | dasa | las | los / dā^{1} | dos | δas | δis | dōs | das | das | dæs |
| cow | gav- | ɣwā | ɣṓw | uɣūi | ɣīw | žōw | gū | gioe | ɣōw | qug |
| brother | brātar- | wrōr | vəróy | vrūδ | vīrīt | virṓd | byā | (marzā^{2}) | virṓt | ærvad^{3} |

The consonant clusters *ft and *xt have also been widely lenited, though again excluding Ormuri-Parachi, and possibly Yaghnobi.

=== External influences ===
The neighboring Indo-Aryan languages have exerted a pervasive external influence on the closest neighbouring Eastern Iranian, as it is evident in the development in the retroflex consonants (in Pashto, Wakhi, Sanglechi, Khotanese, etc.) and aspirates (in Khotanese, Parachi and Ormuri). A more localized sound change is the backing of the former retroflex fricative ṣ̌ [ʂ], to x̌ [x] or to x [χ], found in the Shughni–Yazgulyam branch and certain dialects of Pashto. E.g. "meat": ɡuṣ̌t in Wakhi and γwaṣ̌a in Southern Pashto, but changes to guxt in Shughni, γwax̌a in Central and Northern Pashto.

== Notes ==
- ^1 Munji dā is a borrowing from Persian but Yidgha still uses los.
- ^2 Ormuri marzā has a different etymological origin, but generally Ormuri [b] is preserved unchanged, e.g. *bastra- > bēš, Ormuri for "cord" (cf. Avestan band- "to tie").
- ^3 Ossetic ærvad means "relative". The word for "brother" æfsymær is of a different etymological source.

== See also ==
- Western Iranian languages
- Dari (Eastern Persian), a dialect of a Western Iranian language, despite the name
- Sakan language
