= Zebak District =

Coordinates: 36.5469°N 71.3423°E

Zebak زیبک
- District
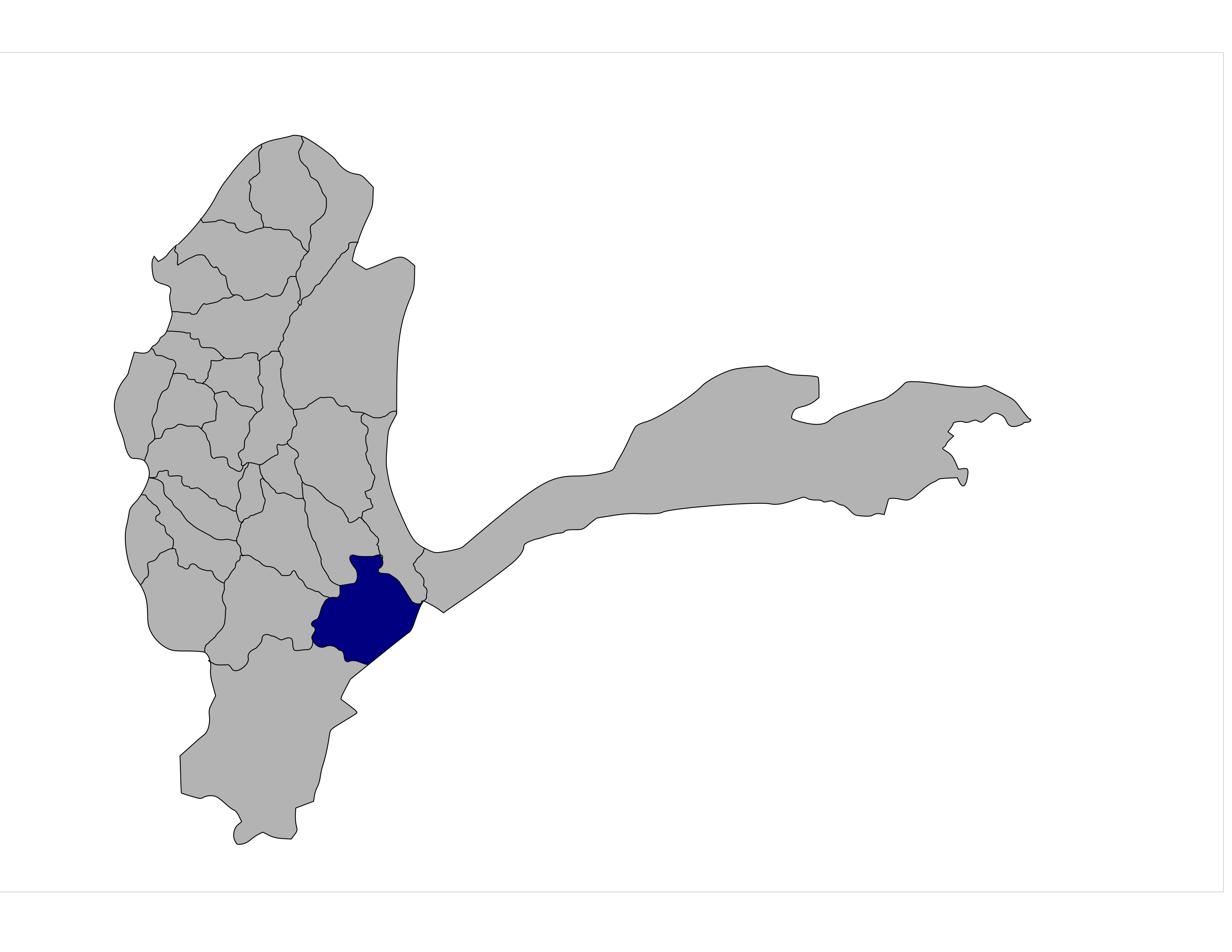
- Country: Afghanistan
- Province: Badakhshan
- Capital: Zebak

Government
  - Type: District council

Population
  - Estimate (2020): 8,902

Zebak (Dari: زیبک) is one of the 29 districts of Badakhshan province in northeastern Afghanistan. It is home to an estimated 8,902 residents, most living in Zebak, the district's capital. The Sanglechi-Ishkashmi language, also referred to as Zebaki, is spoken in the district.

In 2026, the Afghanistan Freedom Front came into conflict with the Taliban in the region as part of the Republican insurgency in Afghanistan.
