= Bulungkol =

Township of Akto County in Xinjiang, China

Bulungkol: 布伦口乡 (Chinese); بۇلۇڭكۆل يېزىسى (Uyghur); بۇلۇڭكۅل ايىلى (Kyrgyz); Bulungköl, Bulunkou
- Township
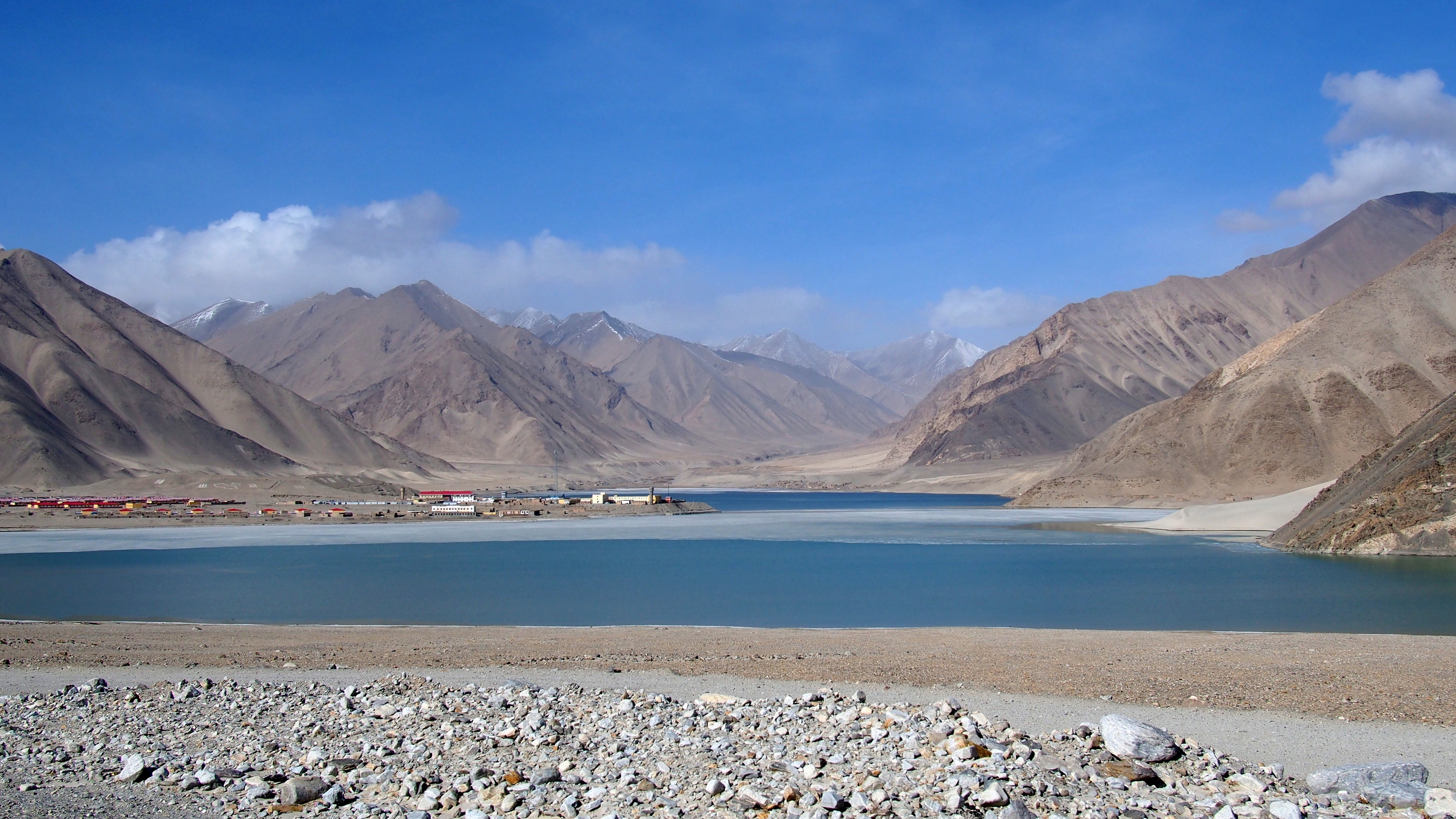
- Bulungkol (middle left) by the eponymous Bulungkol Lake in 2015
- Etymology: "Lake in the corner" in Kyrgyz
- Location of the township
- Coordinates: 38.6639251878°N 74.9515647176°E
- Country: People's Republic of China
- Autonomous region: Xinjiang
- Prefecture: Kizilsu
- County: Akto

Area
  - Total: 4,585 km^{2} (1,770 sq mi)

Population (2017)
  - Total: 7,133

Ethnic groups
  - Major ethnic groups: Kyrgyz
- Time zone: UTC+8 (China Standard Time)
- postal code: 845556
- Area code: 653022 206
- Website: www.xjakt.gov.cn

Bulungkol Township (Chinese: 布伦口乡; Uyghur: بۇلۇڭكۆل يېزىسى; Kyrgyz: بۇلۇڭكۅل ايىلى) is a township of Akto County in Xinjiang, China. Located in the middle west of the county, the township covers an area of 4,585 square kilometers with a population of 7,133 (as of 2017). It has 5 administrative villages under its jurisdiction. Its seat is at Bulungkol Village (布伦口村).

== Name ==
Bulungkol

Chinese name
- Simplified Chinese: 布伦口乡
- Traditional Chinese: 布倫口鄉
Transcriptions
Standard Mandarin
- Hanyu Pinyin: Bùlúnkǒu Xiāng

Uyghur name
- Uyghur: بۇلۇڭكۆل يېزىسى
Transcriptions
- Latin Yëziqi: Bulungköl Yëzisi

Kyrgyz name
- Kyrgyz: بۇلۇڭكۅل ايىلى; Булуң-Көл айылы Buluñ-Köl ajyly

Kazakh name
- Kazakh: بۇلۇڭكول اۋىلى; Бұлұңкөл ауылы Būlūñköl auyly

The name "Bulungkol" is from the Kyrgyz language and means "lake in the corner". It was named after the adjacent Bulungkol Lake (布伦口湖).

== History ==
In 1955, Bulungkol was transferred to Akto County from Tashkurgan County.

In 1959, Bulungkol Commune (布伦口公社) was established.

In 1967, Bulungkol Commune was renamed Fanxiu Commune ('anti-revisionism commune' 反修公社).

In 1984, Fanxiu Commune became Bulungkol Township.

== Geography ==
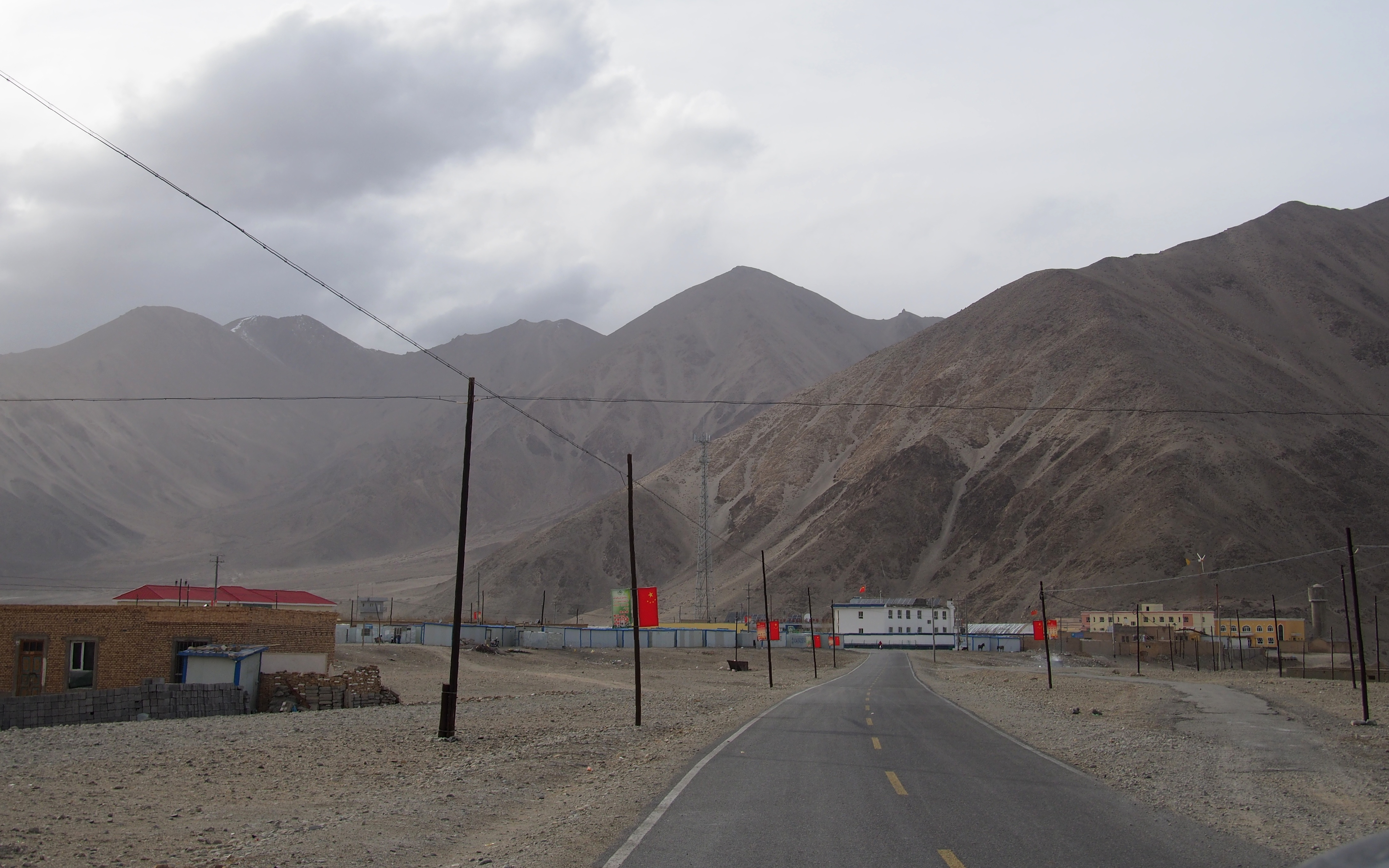

The township of Bulungkol is located on the Pamir Plateau, in the southwest of Akto County, between east longitude 74°36′- 75°37′ and north latitude 38°10′- 38°58′. It is bordered by Barin Township and Kirzilto Township to the east, by the town of Oytak to the north, by Muji Township to the west, and by Tashkurgan County and the Republic of Tajikistan to the south. The township has an 84 kilometres (52 mi) border with neighboring Tajikistan, with 8 mountain passes connecting the two. The seat of Bulungkol Township is 140 kilometres (87 mi) away from the Akto County seat. The area of grassland is 312.90 square kilometres (120.81 mi^{2}), and the area of grazed grassland is 665.15 hectares (1,643.6 acres).

Bulungkol comprises a number of mountains and valleys, with most of its elevation ranging from 3,000 metres (9,800 ft) to 4,500 metres (14,800 ft) above sea level. The township's highest point, Kongur Tiube, is 7,719 metres (25,325 ft) above sea level. The mountains of Kongur Tagh and Muztagh Ata are cascaded, the gullies are horizontal and vertical, and the peaks are covered with snow all year round. There are large areas of glaciers, with the Gez River and the Kangxiwar River (康西瓦尔河) originating from these glaciers. Bulungkol Township's landscape also includes a number of lakes and springs.

=== Flora and fauna ===
The township is home to rare wild animals, such as the snowcock, snow leopard, procapra przewalskii and argali. There is also rare vegetation such as sand holly and snow lotus.

=== Geology ===
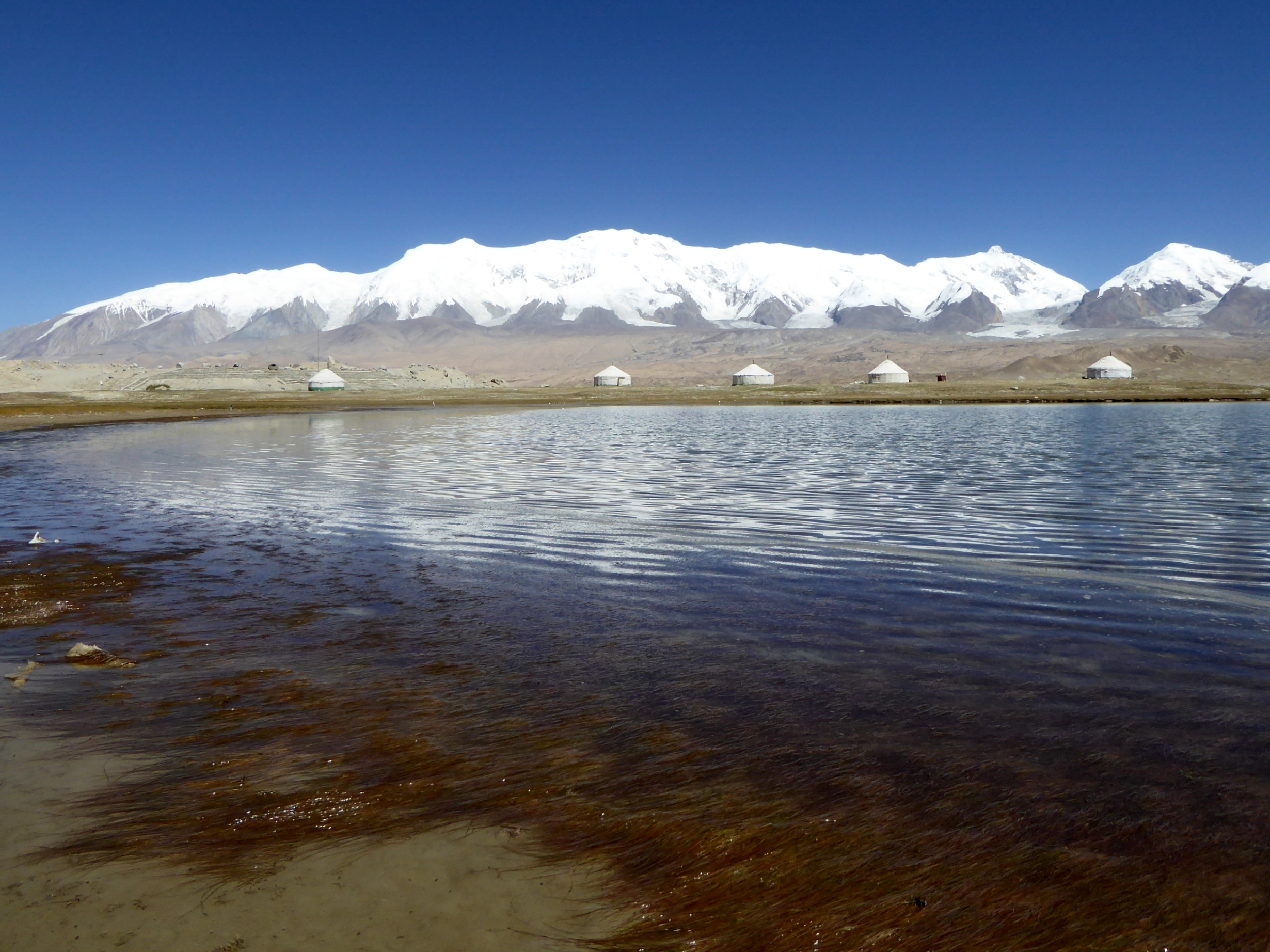
Overlooking Kongur – Mustag Mountains from the Karakoram Highway next to the Karakul Lake

The mineral resources mainly include metal mines such as iron, gold and copper, and non-metallic minerals such as diamond, granite and muscovite.

=== Climate ===
Bulungkol Township has an alpine climate with an average annual temperature of 0.7 °C (33.3 °F). The township's average temperature in January is −12.1 °C (10.2 °F), and its an average temperature in July is 12.2 °C (54.0 °F). Bulungkol Township typically experiences an annual precipitation of between 150 millimetres (5.9 in) and 200 millimetres (7.9 in), and a frost-free period of 90 to 100 days.

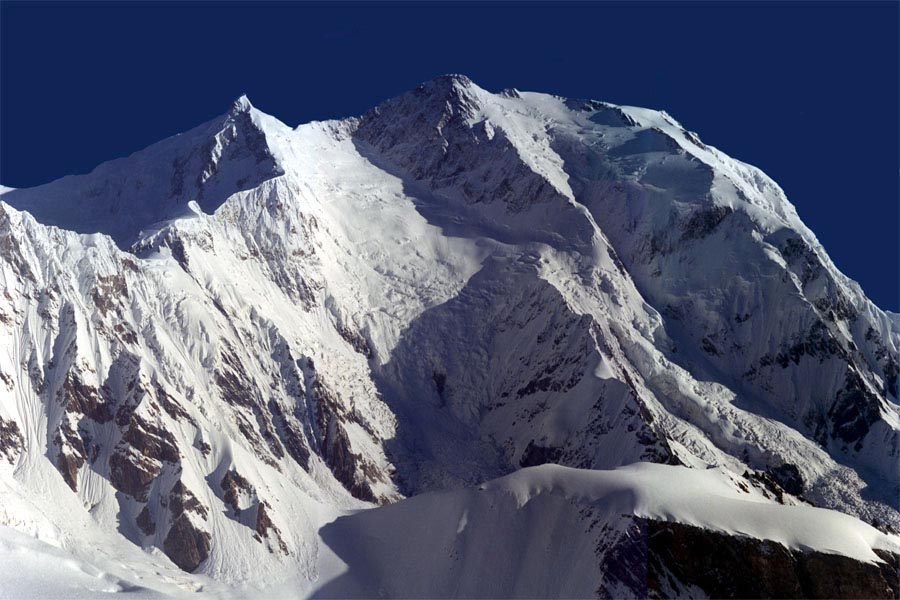
South face of Kongur Tagh

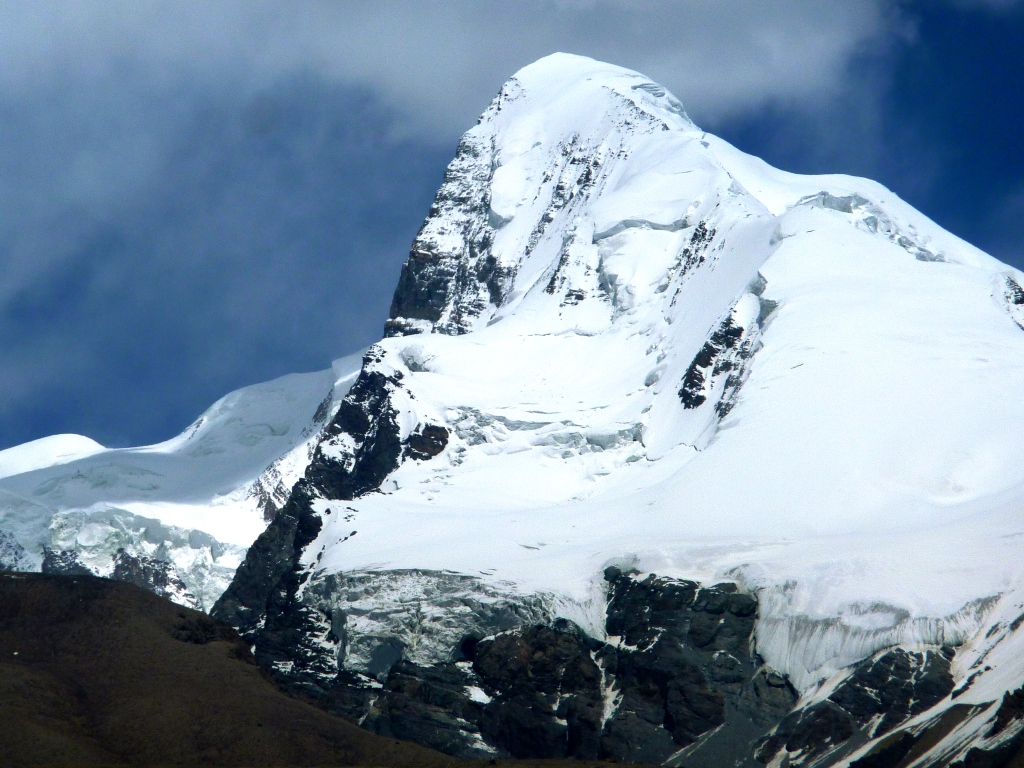
Kongur Tagh

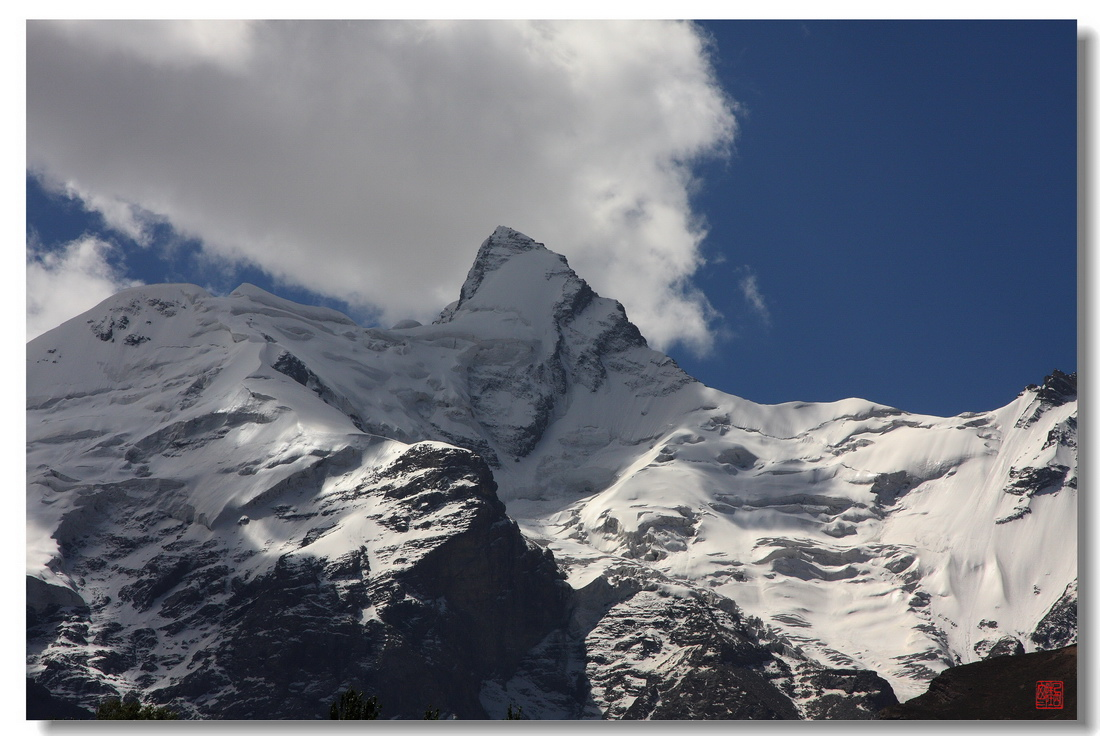
Kongur Tagh

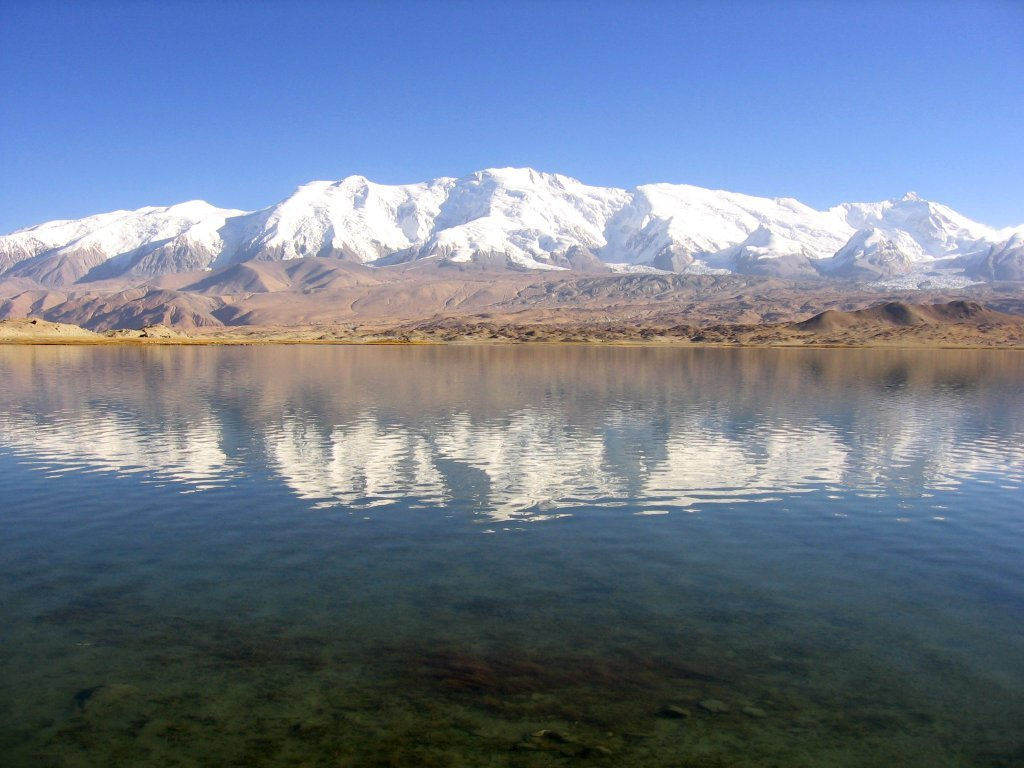
Karakul Lake

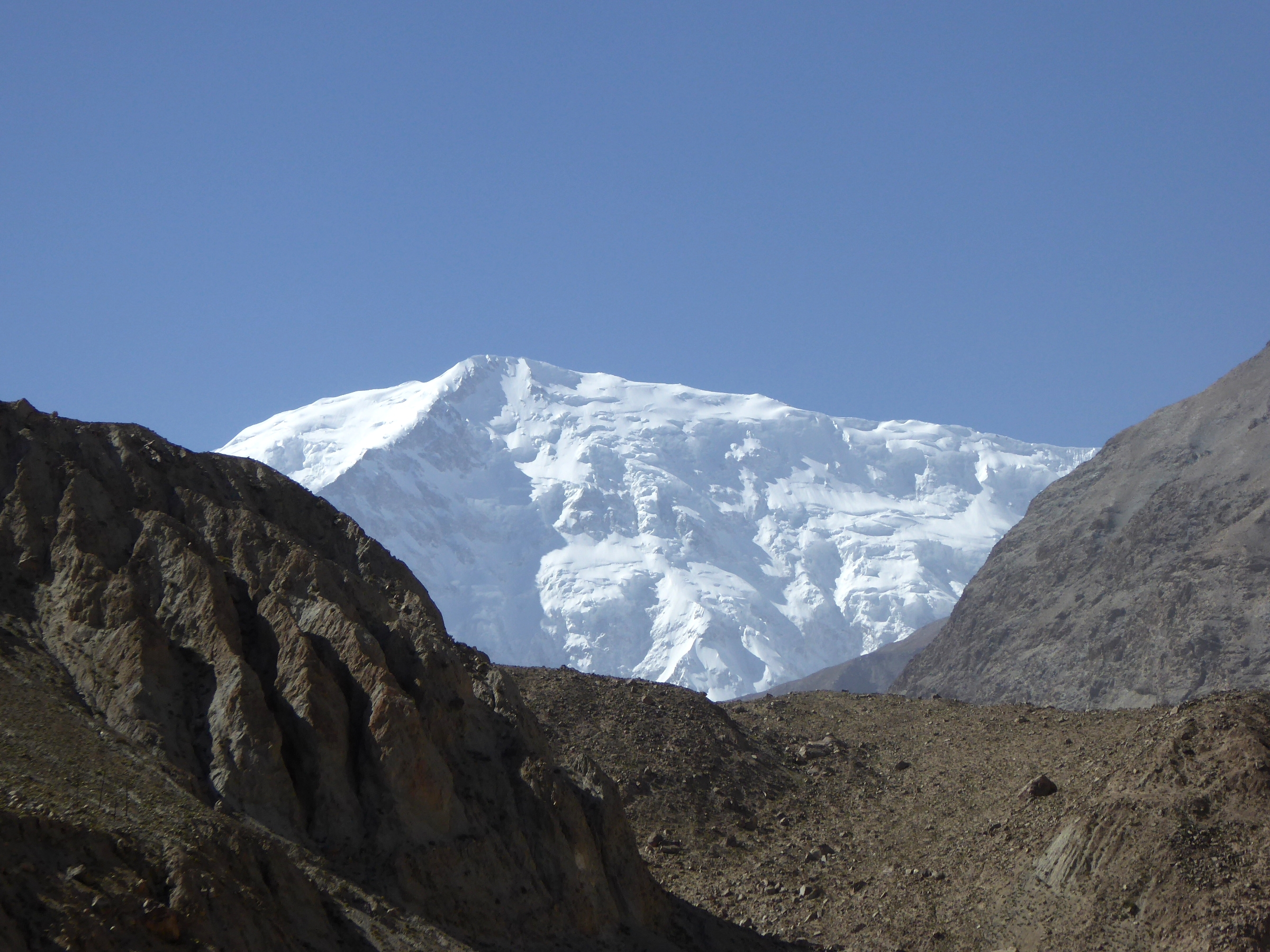
Gez Valley

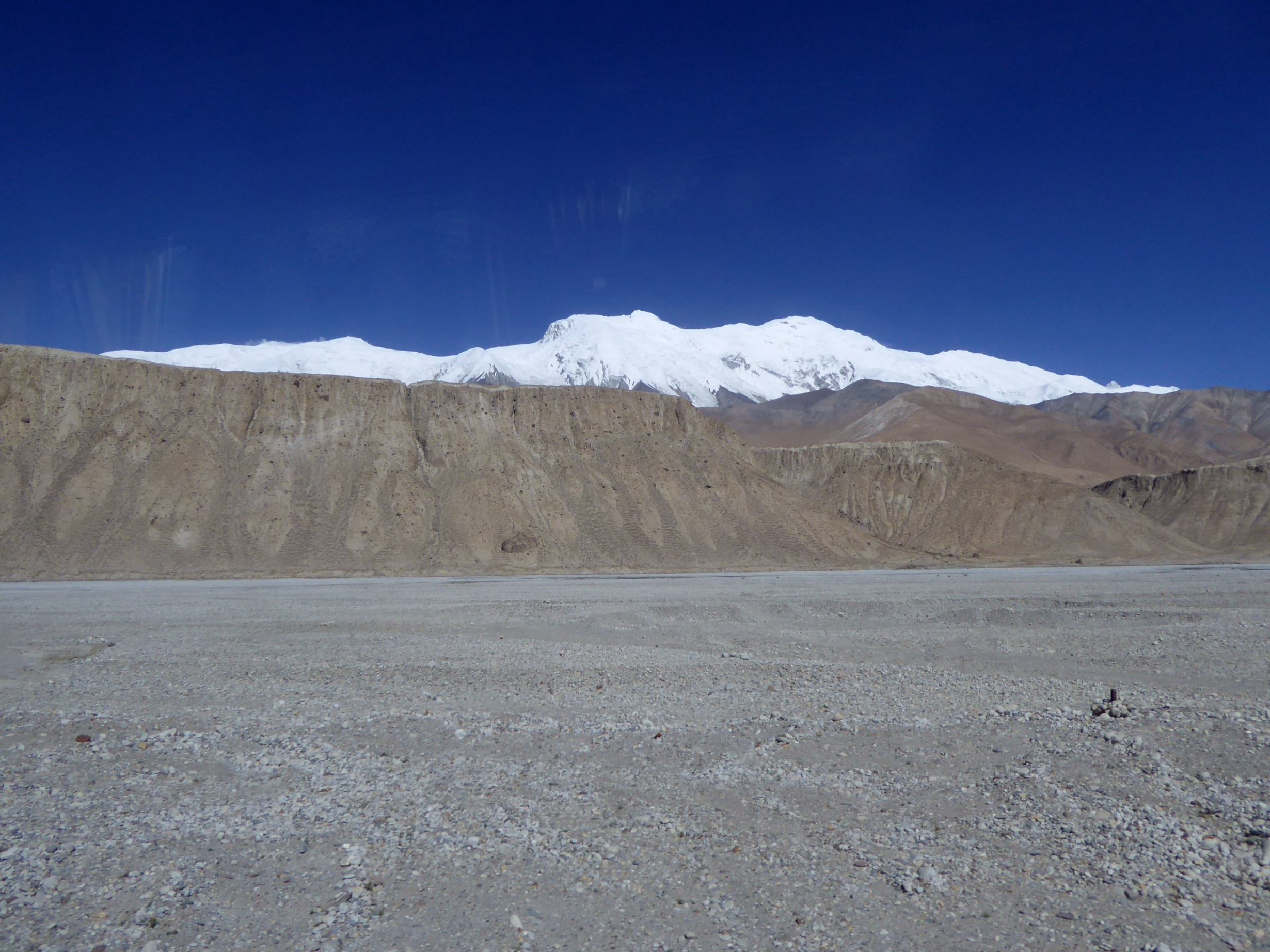
gobi and glaciers

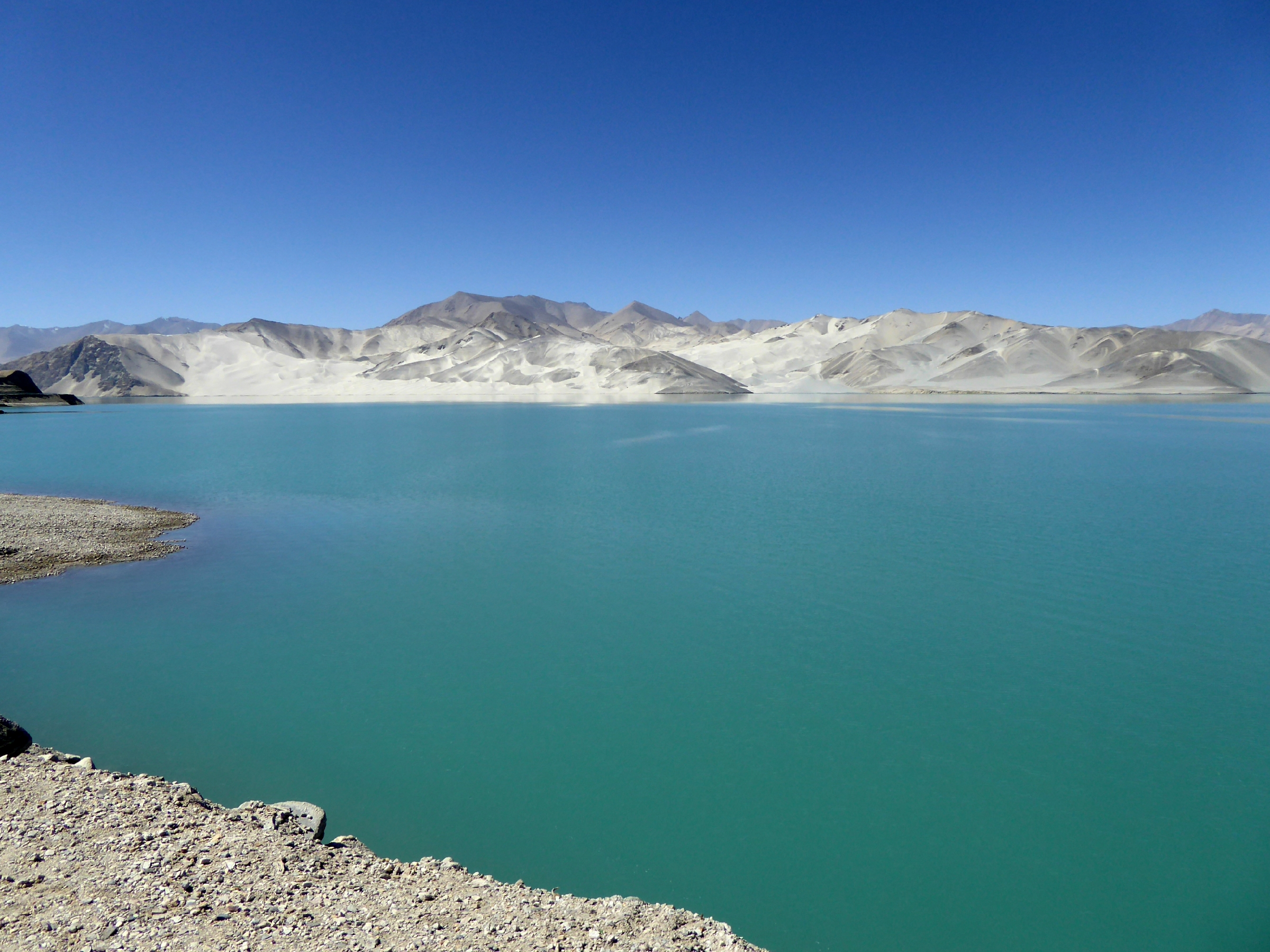
Bulungkol Lake

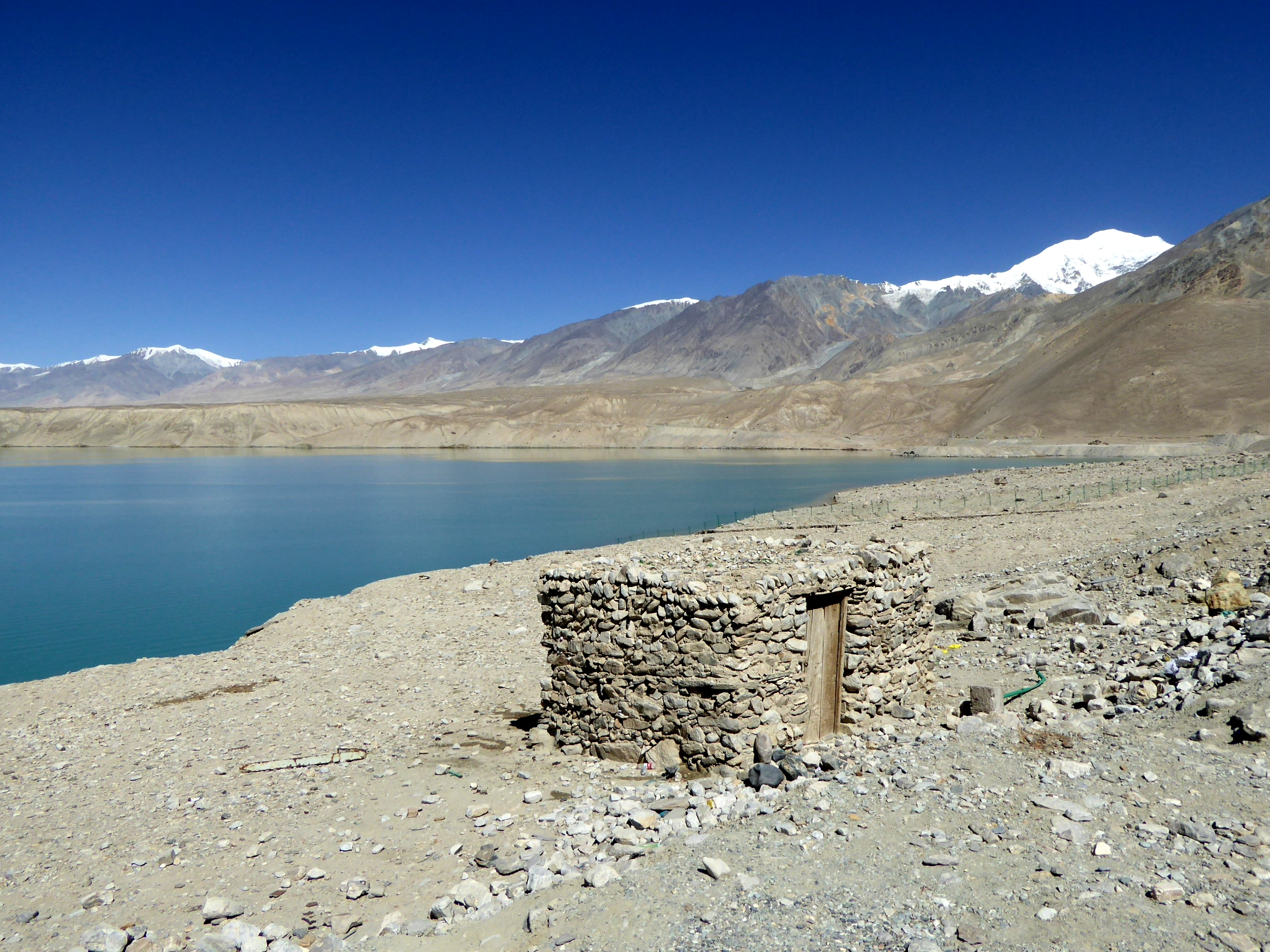
Bulungkol Lake

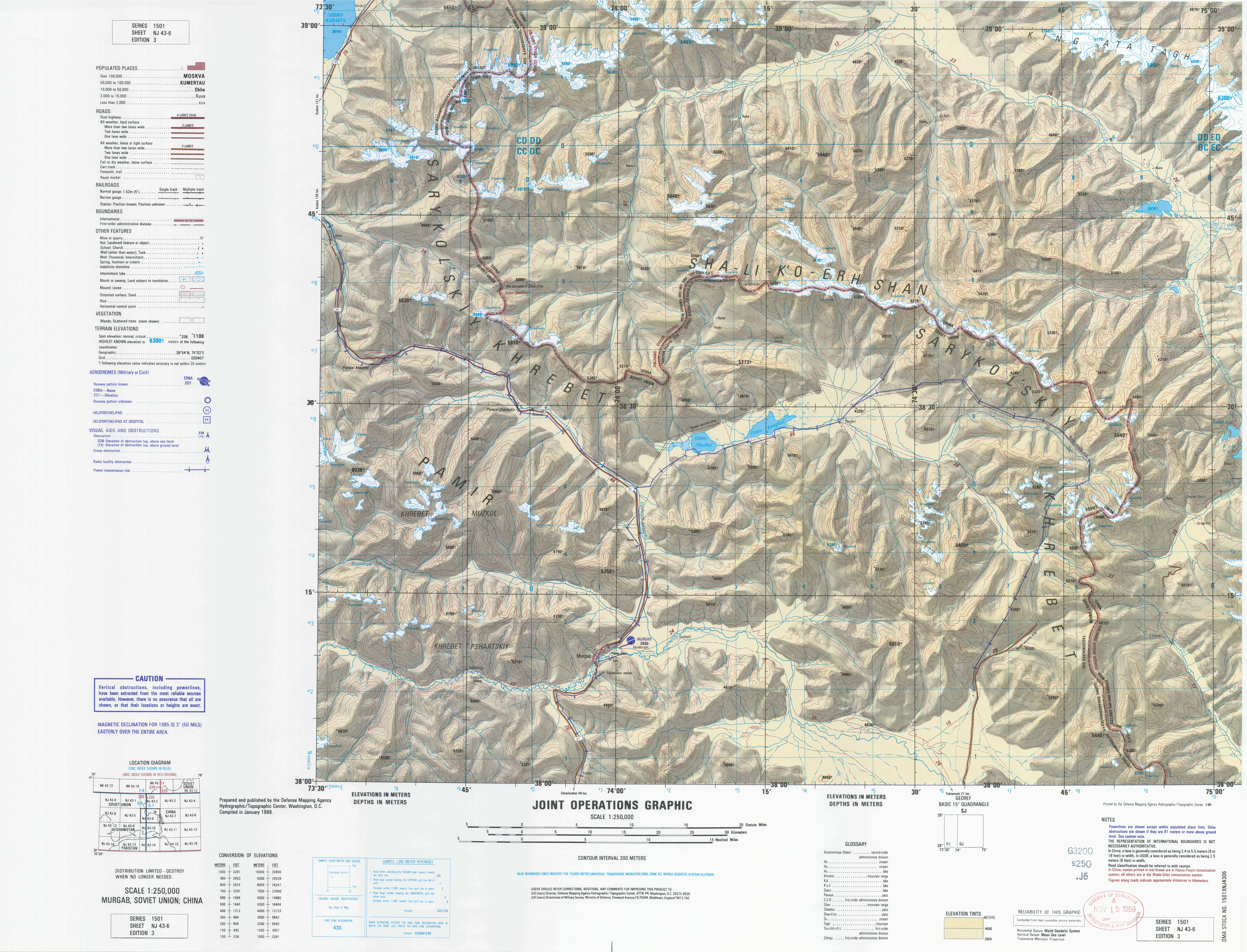
Map of the region including Bulungkol (DMA, 1988)

== Administrative divisions ==
Bulungkol Township governs the following five administrative villages (Chinese: 行政村):

- Bulungkol (Bulunkoucun) (布伦口村, بۇلۇڭكۆل كەنتى, بۇلۇڭكۅل قىشتاعى)
- Gez (Gaizicun) (盖孜村, گەز كەنتى, گەز قىشتاعى)
  - 38°45′58″N 075°18′52″E
- Chaqir'eghil (Qiake’er’aigelecun) (恰克尔艾格勒村, چاقىر ئېغىل كەنتى, چاقىرۇۇاقىل قىشتاعى)
  - 38°47′32″N 074°56′28″E
- Subash (苏巴什村, سۇباش كەنتى, سۇۇباش قىشتاعى)
  - location of Kongur Tagh (公格尔九别峰, قوڭۇر تاغ, قوڭۇر توو)
- Toqay (托喀依村, توقاي كەنتى, توقوي قىشتاعى)

These administrative villages also include a number of natural villages (Chinese: 自然村), which do not serve as administrative divisions, such as the village of Qarjayit (恰尔加依特).

== Demographics ==
Historical population
Year	Pop.	±% p.a.
2000	5,490	—
2010	6,922	+2.34%

As of 1997, the population of Bulungkol Township was 99.9% Kyrgyz.

== Economy ==
Animal husbandry is the main component of Bulungkol's economy, producing Subashi Large-tailed Sheep (苏巴什大尾羊). Mineral resources include iron, copper, spodumene, beryl, muscovite and others.

== Transportation ==
- China National Highway 314, part of the Karakoram Highway

== Tourism ==
The main tourist attractions are Karakul Lake, a designated national tourist attraction, and Baisha Mountain (白沙山).

== See also ==
- China–Tajikistan border
- List of township-level divisions of Xinjiang
