= Karatash River =

Karatash Koshan, Ku'shan Ho
- Etymology: from Turkic: 'Black Stone' River

Location
- Country: China
- State: Xinjiang Uyghur Autonomous Region

Physical characteristics
- Source: Kongur Tagh Range
- Mouth
  - location: Taklamakan Desert, China

Basin features
- Tributaries
  - left: Chimgan River
  - right: Kizmak River

The Karatash River (Koshan, Ku'shan Ho) is south of Kashgar in the Kongur Tagh Range (also referred to as the 'Kongur Shan', or 'Kongur Alps') of the Xinjiang Uyghur Autonomous Region of China. It runs from near the eastern side of the 'Old Karatash Pass' (which is about 30 km southeast of Karakul lake), to the east and then northerly through the small Khirghiz villages of Shargut, Chat, Chimgan and Khan-Terek, flowing out into the Taklamakan Desert about halfway between Kashgar and Yangi Hissar.

"In a sense, the Karatash was very well-known historically, but only in its upper reaches. These lie on what seems to have been a standard trade route from Yarkand to Lake Karakul and beyond."

The lower gorges are very steep, narrow and rough. The British Consul-General in Kashgar, Clarmont P. Skrine, described them in a letter of 1922 as "mysterious and terrible." In the upper valley, near the village of Chat, a community surrounded by wheat fields, of about "three dozen mud-brick houses, a school and a sizeable 'club' whose veranda is decorated with wall paintings," the valley is quite open and easy to travel. The river is fordable just above Chat.

== Kongur Tagh ==
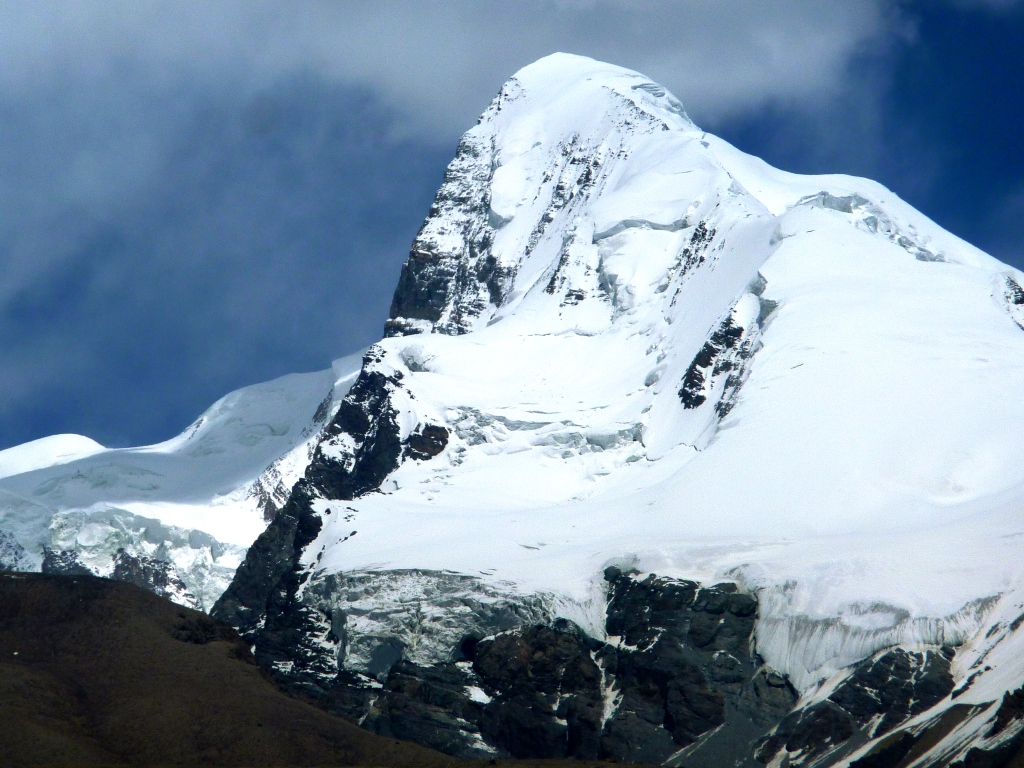
Kongur Tagh peak. 2011

The highest peak in the Kongur Shan is Kongur Tagh or Kongkoerh (Mongolian: Хонгор Таг; Chinese: 公格尔峰; pinyin: Gōnggé'ěr Fēng) (also referred to as Kongur), 7,649 m (25,095 ft), is the highest peak of the Kunlun Mountains in China, and the highest peak with its summit wholly within the Xinjiang Uyghur Autonomous Region. Sometimes it is considered to be a part of the Pamir Mountains.

== See also ==
- List of rivers in China
- List of rivers in Asia
