= List of longest rivers of Asia =

This is the list of Asia's longest rivers

This is a list of longest rivers of Asia. Included are all rivers with lengths over 1,000 km (620 mi) that are in Asia.

| | River | Countries | Length | |
| | River | Countries | km | mi |
|---|---|---|---|---|
| 1 | Yangtze (Cháng Jiāng 長江) | China | 6,300 | 3,915 |
| 2 | Yellow River (Huáng Hé 黃河) | China | 5,464 | 3,395 |
| 3 | Mekong | China, Myanmar, Laos, Thailand, Cambodia, Vietnam | 4,909 | 3,050 |
| 4 | Lena (Лена) | Russia | 4,294 | 2,668 |
| 5 | Irtysh (Иртыш) | Mongolia, China, Kazakhstan, Russia | 4,248 | 2,640 |
| 6 | Indus River | China, India, Pakistan | 3,610 | 2,243 |
| 7 | Ob (Обь) | Russia | 3,650 | 2,268 |
| 8 | Brahmaputra River (सिन्धु/Síndhu, سندھ/سند, سنڌوءَ) | China, India, Bangladesh | 2,800 | 1,740 |
| 9 | Yenisey (Енисей) | Mongolia, Russia | 3,487 | 2,167 |
| 10 | Nizhnyaya Tunguska (Нижняя Тунгуска) | Russia | 2,989 | 1,857 |
| 11 | Ganga (including Padma & Hooghly) | India, Bangladesh | 2,900 | 1,800 |
| 12 | Yarlung Tsangpo (Yarlung Zangbo Jiang) | China, India, Bangladesh | 2,840 | 1,765 |
| 13 | Amur (Heilong Jiang, Амур) | Russia, China | 2,824 | 1,755 |
| 14 | Salween River (သံလွင်မြစ်) | China, Myanmar, Thailand | 2,800 | 1,740 |
| 15 | Euphrates | Iraq, Syria, Turkey | 2,760 | 1,715 |
| 16 | Vilyuy (Вилюй) | Russia | 2,650 | 1,647 |
| 17 | Amu Darya (Oxus) | Afghanistan, Tajikistan, Turkmenistan, Uzbekistan | 2,500 | 1,553 |
| 18 | Ishim (Ишим/Išim) | Kazakhstan, Russia | 2,450 | 1,522 |
| 19 | Ural (Урал) | Kazakhstan, Russia | 2,428 | 1,509 |
| 20 | Pearl River (Zhujiang) | China, Vietnam | 2,320 | 1,442 |
| 21 | Aldan (Алдан) | Russia | 2,273 | 1,412 |
| 22 | Olenyok (Оленёк) | Russia | 2,270 | 1,411 |
| 23 | Syr Darya (Jaxartes) | Kyrgyzstan, Uzbekistan, Tajikistan, Kazakhstan | 2,212 | 1,374 |
| 24 | Irrawaddy River (Ayeyarwady River, ဧရာဝတီမြစ်) | Myanmar | 2,210 | 1,373 |
| 25 | Xi River (西江) | China, Vietnam | 2,197 | 1,365 |
| 26 | Kolyma (Колыма) | Russia | 2,129 | 1,323 |
| 27 | Songhua River (Haixi, Xinga) | China | 1,925 | 1,196 |
| 28 | Podkamennaya Tunguska (Подкаменная Тунгуска) | Russia | 1,865 | 1,159 |
| 29 | Tigris | Turkey, Syria, Iraq | 1,850 | 1,150 |
| 30 | Vitim (Витим) | Russia | 1,837 | 1,141 |
| 31 | Kama (Кама) | Russia | 1,805 | 1,122 |
| 32 | Chulym (Чулым) | Russia | 1,799 | 1,118 |
| 33 | Angara (Ангара) | Russia | 1,779 | 1,105 |
| 34 | Indigirka (Индигирка) | Russia | 1,726 | 1,072 |
| 35 | Ket (Кеть) | Russia | 1,621 | 1,007 |
| 36 | Argun (Ergune) | China, Russia | 1,620 | 1,007 |
| 37 | Tobol (Тобол) | Russia | 1,591 | 989 |
| 38 | Yalong River (雅砻江) | China | 1,571 | 976 |
| 39 | Han River (Han Jiang) | China | 1,532 | 952 |
| 40 | Alazeya (Алазея) | Russia | 1,520 | 944 |
| 41 | Godavari River (Dakshina Ganga) | India | 1,465 | 910 |
| 42 | Bhargavi River | India | 1,465 | 910 |
| 43 | Amga (Амга) | Russia | 1,462 | 908 |
| 44 | Ili (Или) | Kazakhstan, China | 1,439 | 894 |
| 45 | Olyokma (Олёкма) | Russia | 1,436 | 892 |
| 46 | Taz (Таз) | Russia | 1,401 | 871 |
| 47 | Sutlej (Satluj) | China, India, Pakistan | 1,400 | 870 |
| 48 | Liao River (Liáo Hé) | China | 1,390 | 864 |
| 49 | Yamuna (Jumna) | India | 1,376 | 855 |
| 50 | Kura (მტკვარი) | Turkey, Georgia, Azerbaijan | 1,364 | 848 |
| 51 | Hai River (Peiho) | China | 1,329 | 826 |
| 52 | Tarim River (Tǎlǐmù Hé, 塔里木河) | China | 1,321 | 821 |
| 53 | Narmada River (Rewa) | India | 1,300 | 808 |
| 54 | Krishna River | India | 1,290 | 802 |
| 55 | Zeya (Зе́я) | Russia | 1,210 | 752 |
| 56 | Chindwin River | Myanmar | 1,207 | 750 |
| 57 | Chuna (Чуна) | Russia | 1,203 | 748 |
| 58 | Red River (Sông Hồng) | China, Vietnam | 1,200 | 746 |
| 59 | Jialing River (嘉陵江) | China | 1,190 | 739 |
| 60 | Kızılırmak River (Halys River) | Turkey | 1,182 | 734 |
| 61 | Markha (Марха́) | Russia | 1,181 | 734 |
| 62 | Nen River (Nenjiang) | China | 1,170 | 727 |
| 63 | Demyanka (Демьянка) | Russia | 1,159 | 720 |
| 64 | Anadyr (Анадырь) | Russia | 1,150 | 715 |
| 65 | Hari (Теджен) | Afghanistan, Turkmenistan | 1,150 | 715 |
| 66 | Helmand River (هلمند) | Afghanistan, Iran | 1,150 | 715 |
| 67 | Kapuas River (Sungai Kapoeas) | Indonesia | 1,143 | 710 |
| 68 | Omolon (Омолон) | Russia | 1,114 | 692 |
| 69 | Mamberamo River (Sungai Mamberamo) | Indonesia | 1,112 | 691 |
| 70 | Huai River (Hwai Ho) | China | 1,100 | 684 |
| 71 | Wu River (乌江) | China | 1,100 | 684 |
| 72 | Konda (Конда) | Russia | 1,097 | 682 |
| 73 | Tyung (Тюнг) | Russia | 1,092 | 679 |
| 74 | Barito River (Sungai Barito) | Indonesia | 1,090 | 677 |
| 75 | Kherlen River (Хэрлэн гол) | Mongolia, China | 1,090 | 677 |
| 76 | Vasyugan (Васюган) | Russia | 1,082 | 672 |
| 77 | Ghaghara (Karnali) | China, Nepal, India | 1,080 | 671 |
| 78 | Aras (Araxes) | Turkey, Armenia, Iran, Azerbaijan | 1,072 | 666 |
| 79 | Chu (Чу) | Kyrgyzstan, Kazakhstan | 1,067 | 663 |
| 80 | Bolshoy Yugan (Большой Юган) | Russia | 1,063 | 661 |
| 81 | Maya (Мая) | Russia | 1,053 | 654 |
| 82 | Tura (Тура) | Russia | 1,030 | 640 |
| 83 | Chambal | India | 1,024 | 636 |
| 84 | Biryusa (Бирюса) | Russia | 1,012 | 629 |

== See also ==
- List of rivers of Asia
