= List of rivers of Asia =

This is a List of rivers of Asia. It includes major, notable rivers in Asia.

== Alphabetical order ==
- Amu Darya - Afghanistan, Turkmenistan, Uzbekistan - Aral Sea
- Amur - Northeastern China, Russia (Siberia) - Sea of Okhotsk
- Angara - Russia
- Argun River - China, Russia
- Aras - Turkey, Armenia, Iran, Azerbaijan
- Atrek - Iran, Turkmenistan
- Badulu Oya - Sri Lanka
- Bentara River - Sri Lanka
- Bhima River (maharastra) - India
- Buriganga River - Bangladesh
- Büyük Menderes River - Turkey
- Chao Phraya - Thailand - Gulf of Thailand
- Chenab River - Pakistan, India
- Deduru Oya River - Sri Lanka
- Devi River - India
- Euphrates (Fırat) - Turkey, Syria, Iraq
- Gal Oya River - Sri Lanka
- Ganges River - India, Bangladesh
- Ghaggar-Hakra River - India, Pakistan
- Gin River - Sri Lanka
- Ga'aton River - Israel
- Godavari - India
- Hai - China - Yellow Sea
- Han River - Korea - Yellow Sea
- Hari River - Afghanistan, Turkmenistan
- Helmand River - Afghanistan, Iran
- Hatton Oya - Sri Lanka
- Hongshui River - China
- Huai - China - Yellow Sea
- Huang He (Yellow River) - China
- Huangpu River - China
- Hulan River - China
- Hululu Ganga - Sri Lanka
- Indus - China (Tibet), Pakistan
- Irrawaddy - Burma
- Irtysh - China
- Jamuna -Bangladesh
- Jhelum River - Pakistan
- Jordan - Israel, Jordan, Palestine, Syria
- Kabul River - Pakistan, Afghanistan
- Kala Oya River - Sri Lanka
- Kalu River - Sri Lanka
- Paras River - Russia
- Kampar River - Indonesia
- Kanakarayan Aru - Sri Lanka
- Kapuas - Borneo
- Karakash - China (Takla Makan)
- Karatash River - Xinjiang Uyghur Autonomous Region of China
- Karnaphuli - India, Bangladesh
- Karun - Iran
- Kaveri River - India
- Kelani River - Sri Lanka
- Khabur - Turkey, Syria
- Kishon River - Israel
- Kızılırmak River, Halys - Turkey
- Krishna - India - Bay of Bengal
- Kolyma - Russia (Siberia)
- Kotmale Oya - Sri Lanka
- Küçük Menderes (Cayster) - Turkey
- Lena - Russia (Siberia)
- Lijiang
- Lishui (Li) - China
- Liao - Northeast China - Bohai Gulf
- Litani River - Lebanon
- Loboc River - Bohol, Philippines
- Luni River - Rajasthan, India
- Maduru Oya River - Sri Lanka
- Mae Sai River -Myanmar (Tachileik) - Thailand (Mae Sai)
- Maha Oya River - Sri Lanka
- Malwathu Oya River - Sri Lanka
- Marghab River - Afghanistan, Turkmenistan
- Marikina River - Philippines (Marikina, Metro Manila)
- Meghna-Bangladesh
- Mekong - China, Laos, Myanmar, Thailand, Vietnam, Cambodia.
- Menik River - Sri Lanka
- Mindanao - Philippines
- Mahaweli River - Sri Lanka
- Mahanadhi River (Orissa) - India
- Naf River - Myanmar, Bangladesh
- Nagavalli River - India
- Nakdong River - South Korea - Korea Strait
- Nan River - Thailand
- Narmada River - India (Gujarat)
- Nilwala River - Sri Lanka
- Nizhnyaya Tunguska River (Lower Tunguska) - Russia
- Ob - Russia (Siberia) - Gulf of Ob of the Arctic Ocean
- Om - Russia
- Orontes ('Asi) - Lebanon, Syria, Turkey
- Pasig River - Philippines (Pasig and Manila, Metro Manila)
- Pearl River - China - South China Sea
- Penna River - India
- Periyar River - India (Kerala)
- Rajang River - Malaysia - South China Sea
- Ravi River - Pakistan, India
- Red River - China, Vietnam - South China Sea
- Rio Grande de Mindanao - Philippines
- Sabarmati River - India
- Sakarya River - Turkey
- Salween - China (Tibet, Yunnan), Myanmar, Thailand - Andaman Sea
- Sefid River - Iran
- Selenge River - Mongolia, Russia (Siberia)
- Shatt al-Arab - Iraq, Iran - Persian Gulf
- Singapore River - Singapore, Singapore-Marina Reservoir
- Songhua - Northeast China, far eastern Russia
- Sutlej river - Pakistan, India
- Syr Darya - Kazakhstan
- Tapti River (Maharashtra)-India
- Tigris - Turkey, Syria, Iraq
- Tumen River - China, North Korea, Russia - Sea of Japan
- Tuo river - China
- Thungabhadra River - India
- Thamarabarani River - India
- Ural River - Russia and Kazakhstan
- Vaigai River - India
- Wa River - Thailand
- Walawe River - Sri Lanka
- Xi - China
- Xiang - China
- Yamuna River - India
- Yangtze (Chang Jiang) - China - East China Sea
- Yalu - North Korea, China - Korea Bay of the Yellow Sea
- Yarkon River - Israel
- Yellow River (Huang He) - China - Yellow Sea
- Yenisei - Russia (Siberia)
- Yeşilırmak - Turkey
- Yuan - China
- Yurungkash - China (Takla Makan)
- Zayanderud - Iran
- Zeravshan - Tajikistan, Uzbekistan
- Zi River - China

== Rivers of Asia by discharge ==
Largest primary rivers of Asia by discharge:
River	Average discharge (m^{3}/s) at mouth
01 Ganges– Brahmaputra	45,028
02 Yangtze	31,900
03 Yenisei	20,200
04 Lena	18,300
05 Mekong	15,856
06 Irrawaddy	15,112
07 Ob	13,100
08 Amur	12,360
09 Pearl	9,631
10 Salween	6,691
11 Kapuas	6,012
12 Indus	5,589
13 Rajang	4,715
14 Barito	4,514
15 Hong	4,300
16 Mahakam	4,278
17 Kolyma	4,100
18 Godavari	3,505
19 Kaladan	3,476
20 Shatt al-Arab–Euphrates–Tigris	3,350
21 Khatanga	3,200
22 Musi	3,054
23 Batang Hari	2,643
24 Yellow	2,571
25 Pyasina	2,550
26 Kayan	2,463
27 Krishna	2,214
28 Mahanadi	2,119
29 Anadyr	2,020
30 Min	1,980

(continues)
River	Average discharge (m^{3}/s) at mouth
30 Min	1,980
31 Indigirka	1,930
32 Taz	1,903
33 Sittaung	1,901
34 Tanintharyi	1,778
35 Cagayan	1,739
36 Huai	1,616
37 Baram	1,590
38 Karnaphuli	1,549
39 Narmada	1,490
40 Fuchun	1,436
41 Mindanao	1,400
42 Kampar	1,351
43 Indragiri	1,339
44 Amu Darya	1,330
45 Pur	1,289
46 Sesayap	1,275
47 Agusan	1,268
48 Olenyok	1,210
49 Saigon	1,173
50 Mendawai	1,135
51 Yana	1,110
52 Pahang	1,076
53 Kamchatka	1,050
54 Kahayan	1,046
55 Menam	1,000

== See also ==
- Lists of rivers
- List of rivers of Africa
- List of rivers of the Americas
- List of the longest Asian rivers
- List of rivers of Europe
- List of rivers of Oceania
- Major rivers of India
