= Kongur Tiube =

Mountain in China

- 公格尔九别峰
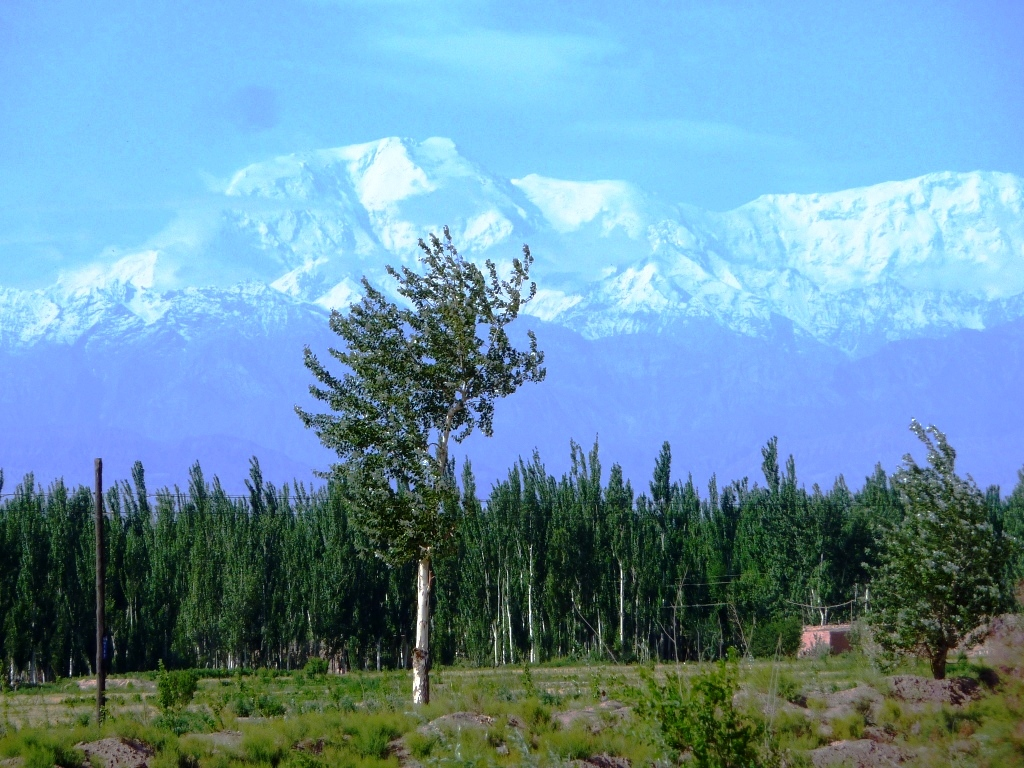
- Kongur Tiube (Kongur Tagh II peak)

Highest point
- Elevation: 7,530 m (24,700 ft); Ranked 46th
- Prominence: 810 m (2,660 ft)
- Coordinates: 38°35′37″N 75°11′44″E

Geography
- Location within Southern Xinjiang
- Location: Akto County, Xinjiang, China
- Parent range: Pamir Mountains

Climbing
- First ascent: Kirill Kuzmin and others, August 1956
- Easiest route: Rock/snow/ice climb

Kongur Tagh, which means "a brown mountain" in Uyghur language, has a significant subpeak known as Kongur Tiube (公格尔九别峰 which means in the local language "the mountain with a white cap", also Kongur Tiubie / Jiubie and Kungur Tjube Tagh), 38°36′57″N 75°11′44″E; elevation = 7,530 metres (24,700 ft).Ranked 46th It is moderately independent, with a topographic prominence of 840 m (2,760 ft).

In 1956 Evgeny Andrianovich Beletsky led a large expedition of Soviet and Chinese climbers to Xinjiang. After successfully making the first ascent of Muztagh Ata a smaller group, led by Kirill Kuzmin set out to make the first ascent of Kongur Tiube. On 16 August Kuzmin reached the summit, accompanied by five other Soviet mountaineers and two Chinese mountaineers.

In 2015, Chinese state media reported about a huge body of the Kongur Tiube glacier collapsing causing a 20 km long and one kilometre wide ice rock avalanche.

== See also ==
- Karakoram Highway
- Kongur Tagh
