= Karakul (Xinjiang) =

Lake in Akto County, Xinjiang, China

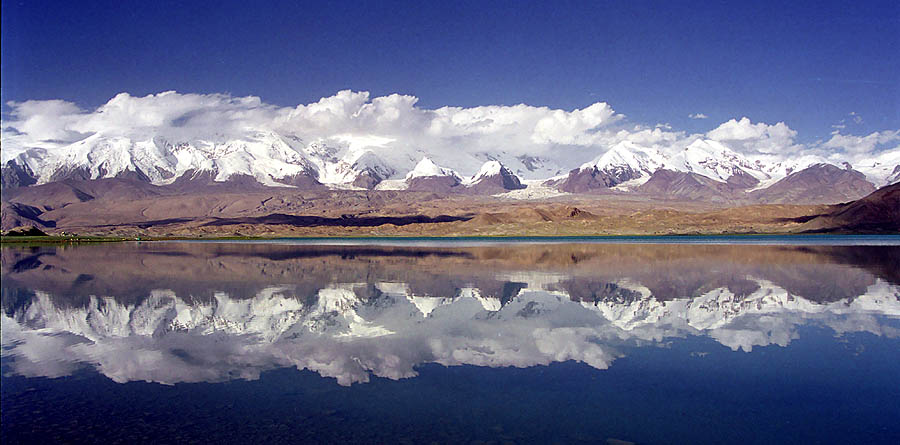
- With Mt Kongur at the background

- Location of the Karakul within the greater Pamir region
- Interactive map of Karakul
- Location: Xinjiang
- Coordinates: 38°26′44″N 75°03′13″E
- Basin countries: China
- Surface area: 4.8 km^{2} (1.9 sq mi)
- Max. depth: 242 m (794 ft)
- Surface elevation: 3,645 m (11,959 ft)

Karakul

Chinese name
- Traditional Chinese: 喀拉庫勒湖
- Simplified Chinese: 喀拉库勒湖
Transcriptions
Standard Mandarin
- Hanyu Pinyin: Kālākùlēi Hú

Abbreviation
- Chinese: 喀拉湖
Transcriptions
Standard Mandarin
- Hanyu Pinyin: Kālā Hú

Kirghiz name
- Kirghiz: Қарoкул

The Karakul or Karakuli (Uyghur: قاراكۆل, romanized: Qaraköl, Қаракөл; Kyrgyz: Каракөл; Tajik: Қарокӯл; Russian: Каракуль, lit. "black lake"), is a lake located 196 km southwest of Kashgar, Xinjiang Uyghur Autonomous Region of China. It is located in Akto County, Kizilsu Kirgiz Autonomous Prefecture on the Karakoram Highway, before reaching Tashkurgan, the Khunjerab Pass on the China – Pakistan border and Sost in Pakistan.

At an altitude of 3,600 m, it is one of the highest lakes of the Pamir plateau, near the junction of the Pamir, Tian Shan and Kunlun mountain ranges. Surrounded by mountains which remain snow-covered throughout the year, the three highest peaks visible from the lake are the Muztagh Ata (7,546 m), Kongur Tagh (7,649 m) and Kongur Tiube (7,530 m). The meltwater from the nearby Muztagh Ata glaciers profoundly influences the lake water and sediment chemistry.

The lake is popular among travellers for its scenery and the clarity of its reflection in the water, whose color ranges from a dark green to azure and light blue. There are two Kirgiz settlements along the shore of Karakul lake, a small number of yurts about 1 km east of the bus drop-off point and a village with stone houses located on the western shores.

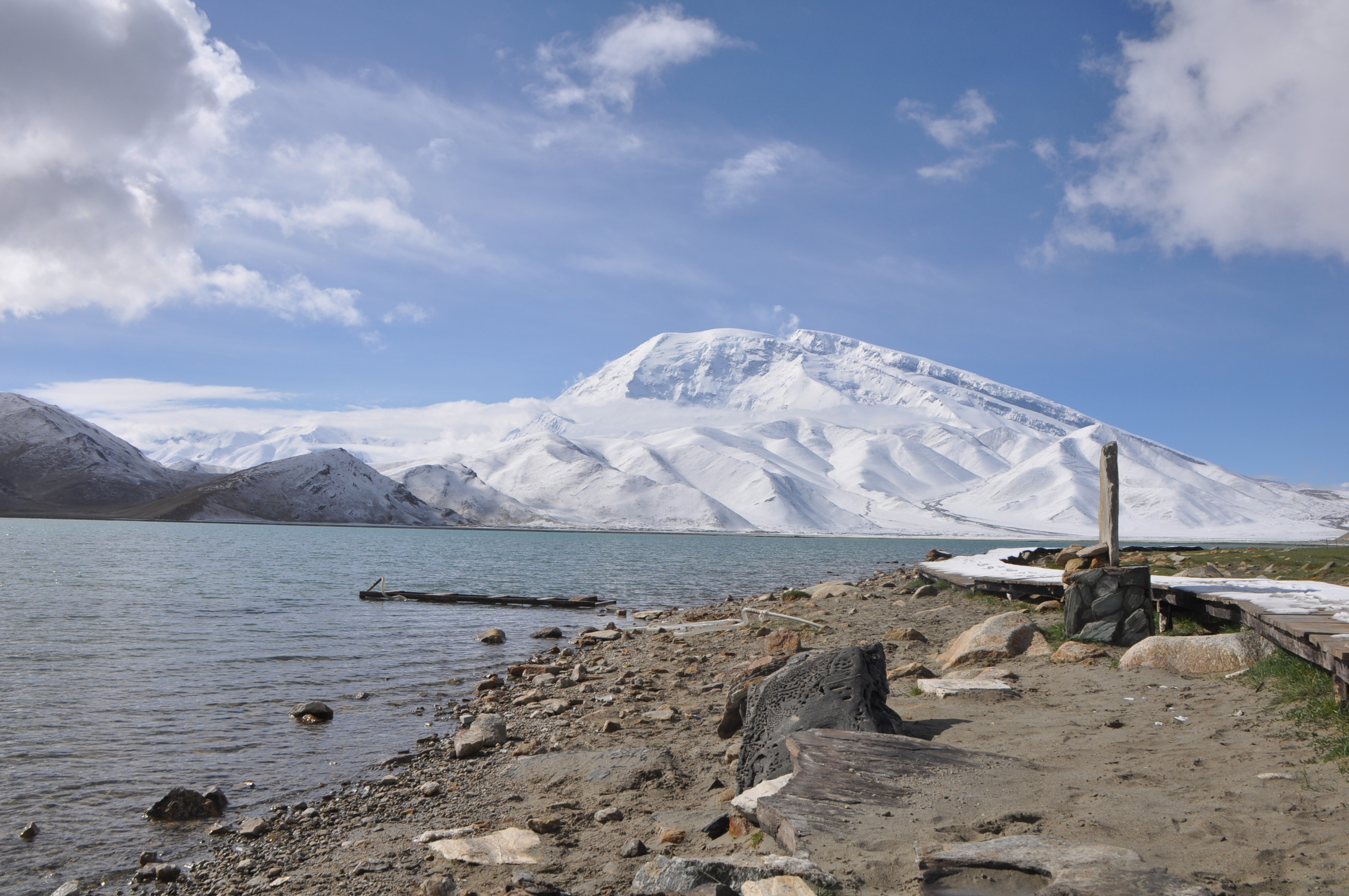
Karakul Lake, with Muztag Ata across the lake

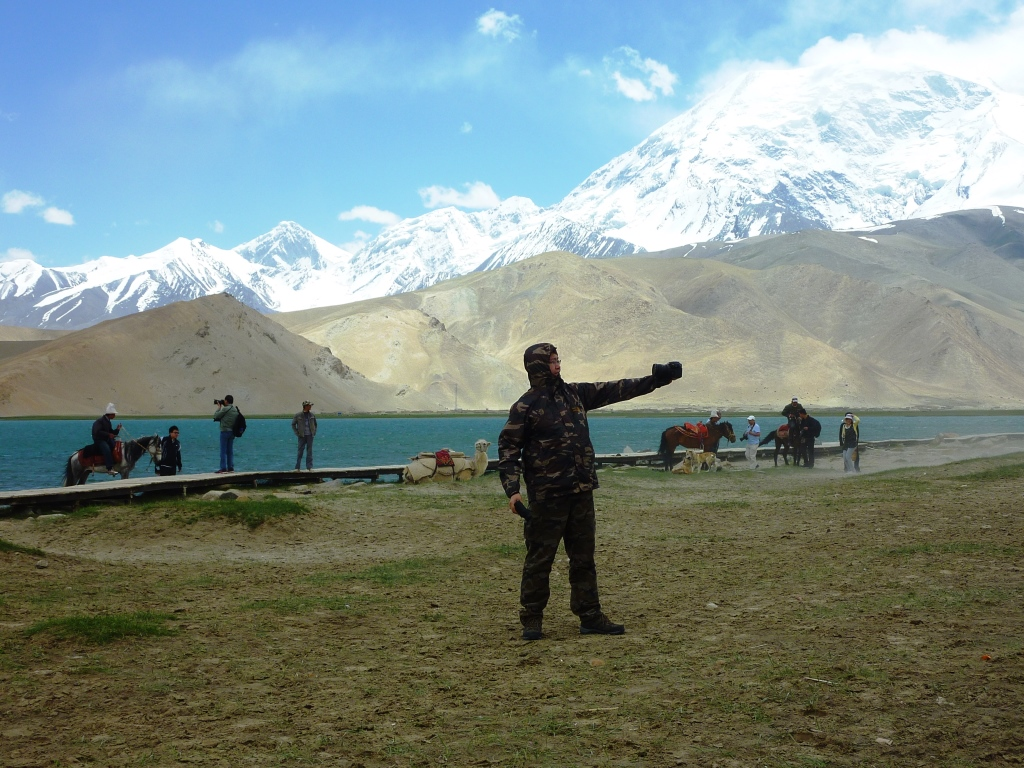
Chinese Tourists at Little Karakul Lake. 2011
