= Yevgeny Beletsky =

Soviet mountaineer (1908–1979)

Yevgeny Andrianovich Beletsky
- Full name: Yevgeny Andrianovich Beletsky
- Born: 15 November 1908 Siedlce, Russian Empire
- Died: 15 December 1979 (aged 71) Leningra, USSR

Yevgeny Beletsky (15 [28] November 1908, (Note: According to the mountaineering club "St. Petersburg", 28 November — according to this date the 100th anniversary of E.A. Beletsky will be celebrated in 2008. According to the book "Beletsky Peak" by L. M. Zamyatin, November 20.) Siedlce, Siedlce Governorate, Congress Poland, Russian Empire - 15 December 1979, Leningrad, USSR) was a Soviet mountaineer, Honored Master of Sports of the USSR (1946), Honored Coach of the USSR (1961), bronze medalist of the USSR mountaineering championship (1955), highly skilled turner and sculptor, author of books and articles on mountaineering, geography and engineering, full member of the USSR Geographical Society.

During the Pamir expedition in 1937, he participated in the third successful ascent of Lenin Peak (7134 m) in history, as well as the second ascent of the highest peak in the USSR —-Stalin Peak (later — Communism Peak, and now — Ismoil Somoni Peak, 7495 m), becoming the first mountaineer to conquer two "seven-thousanders" in one season. Before the war he made a number of difficult ascents in the Caucasus.

During the Great Patriotic War, he took part in battles in the Caucasus. In February 1943, he was part of a group of mountaineers who raised the Soviet flag and removed the banners with Nazi symbols from the highest point in Europe — the western peak of Mount Elbrus.

After the war, he made a number of first ascents in the Pamirs. In 1956, he led an expedition of Soviet and Chinese mountaineers that climbed Mount Muztagh Ata (7546 m) in the Chinese part of the Pamirs. In 1958 he was appointed one of the leaders of the Soviet part of the joint Soviet-Chinese Himalayan expedition to Jomolungma (Everest), which was to be realized in 1959, but the participation of Soviet mountaineers in this expedition was cancelled due to the aggravation of the political situation in Tibet.

A mountain peak in the Trans-Alay Range (Beletsky Peak, 6071 m), as well as one of the tributaries of the Korzhenevsky Glacier in the Pamirs were named in honor of Evgeny Beletsky.

== Biography ==
=== Early years ===
Eugene Beletsky was born in 1908 in Siedlec (now Siedlce), his father was a Russian language teacher, Andrian Georgievich Beletsky, and Maria Vasilievna Beletska (née Perlik). Eugene had two brothers (Yuri and Vsevolod) and two sisters (Elena and Tatiana). After the outbreak of World War I, Andrian Georgievich was transferred with his gymnasium to Vladimir, and Maria Vasilievna with four children (Tatiana was not yet born) moved to Romny, and after a while — to Hadiach.

In 1919 the whole family moved to Dmitrovka, Chernihiv Governorate — the native village of Andrian Georgievich. In their house lived many relatives, both on the father's and mother's side. The times were hard — there was a famine in Ukraine, there were typhus epidemics. Nevertheless, everyone in the Beletsky house lived in friendship, supported each other. They organized a house orchestra and even a theater. Since childhood, Eugene could speak not only Russian, Ukrainian and Polish, but also French and German (many years later, when he was already about 45 years old, he learned English in evening classes).

At the age of 13, working as a watchman in the summer, Eugene managed to earn some money, which he gave to his mother in the family budget. There, in Dmitrovka, he joined the Komsomol and became one of the first komsomol members in the village.

=== Before the war ===
In 1925, a year after graduating from a seven-year school in Dmitrovka, Evgeny Beletsky went to work in Leningrad, where he entered to the Professional technical school "Krasny Putilovets" factory (formerly the Putilovsky Plant, later the Kirov Plant). In 1929 Beletsky became a member of the All-Union Communist Party of the Bolsheviks (VKP(b)), and in 1930 he was appointed editor of the factory newspaper "Krasny Putilovets", whose circulation at that time reached 23,000 copies.

Beletsky began mountaineering in the early 1930s. In 1931, he and his friends took part in a mountaineering expedition through the Twiber Pass in the Caucasus, which connects Svaneti and Kabardino-Balkaria. Since 1932, he was involved in the mountain section of the Society for Proletarian Tourism and Excursion under the leadership of Boris Delaunay, travelling to the Central and Western Caucasus. In 1932 in Dombay Beletsky made an ascent of Mount Ertsog, and in August 1933 together with a more experienced mountaineer Victor Mitnikov made the first ascent to the summit of Tyutyun-Bashi in the Central Caucasus, but on the descent Mitnikov fell from the ridge and died. In 1934, Evgeny Beletsky was an instructor of the 2nd Red Army Alpiniade and climbed the eastern summit of Mount Elbrus. In 1935, he climbed Elbrus in winter and was also an instructor of the mass summer ascent of Elbrus. In the same season he made a technically difficult ascent of Northern Ushba.

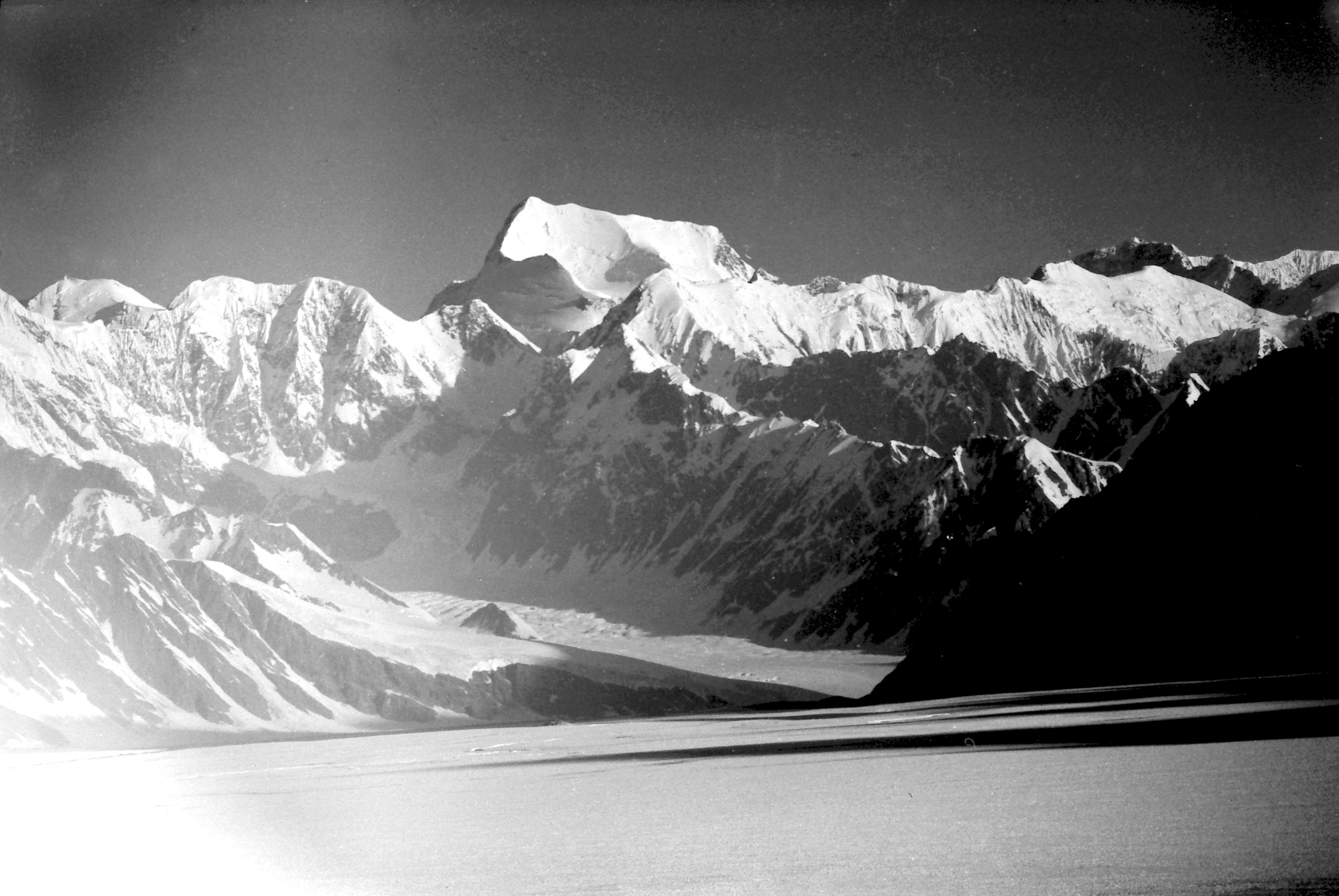
Ismoil Somoni Peak, photo of 1982

In 1936, together with Ivan Fedorov, Evgeny Beletsky made the first ascent of Dzerzhinsky Peak (6713 m) in the Pamir Mountains, near Lenin Peak. In the same year, Beletsky was part of a group of mountaineers who explored the Fortambek Glacier area to study possible routes to climb Stalin Peak (7495 m), the highest peak in the USSR (later known as Communism Peak and now Ismoil Somoni Peak). In addition to Beletsky, the group included P. N. Alhambrov, Nikolai Gusak, Danil Gushchin, Alexander (Alyosha) Dzhaparidze, and Ivan Fedorov.

In 1937, Evgeny Beletsky was in the Pamirs as part of a large expedition dedicated to the 20th anniversary of the October Revolution. First, he participated in the third successful ascent of Lenin Peak (7134 m) in history. The leader of the group was Lev Barkhash, and its members, besides Beletsky, were Stanislav Ganetsky, V. Martynov, Grigory Rozentsveig, Ariy Polyakov, B. Iskin, and P. Alhambrov. Beletsky then joined a group of climbers who made the second ever ascent of Stalin Peak (7495 m). The group was led by Oleg Aristov and included Nikolai Gusak, Viktor Kirkorov, and Ivan Fedorkov in addition to Beletsky. At an altitude of about 7450 m, Oleg Aristov slipped and fell off the ridge and died after flying about 700 m. The rest of the group, unable to descend to his body, reached the summit. As a result of these two ascents, Beletsky became the first mountaineer to climb two "seven-thousanders" in one season.

In 1938, Beletsky was in charge of the Central School of Mountaineering Instructors, located in the Adylsu Mount in the Caucasus. In the same year, he was the leader of a group of mountaineers who made a record achievement for that time — a traverse of the Bezengi Wall from east to west (besides Beletsky, the group included Ivan Leonov, Danil Gushchin and Abram Berdichevsky). This traverse took 18 days in harsh weather conditions, significantly exceeding the maximum limit of 10 days that they had notified the local rescue service before setting out on the route. On the twelfth day, the group members were seen by a pilot from a search plane, but a rescue team of climbers at the base of the wall was still on their feet. Despite the fact that the group completed this record crossing independently, its leader Beletsky was reprimanded by the mountaineering authorities, disqualified, and stripped of the title of Master of Sports of the USSR.

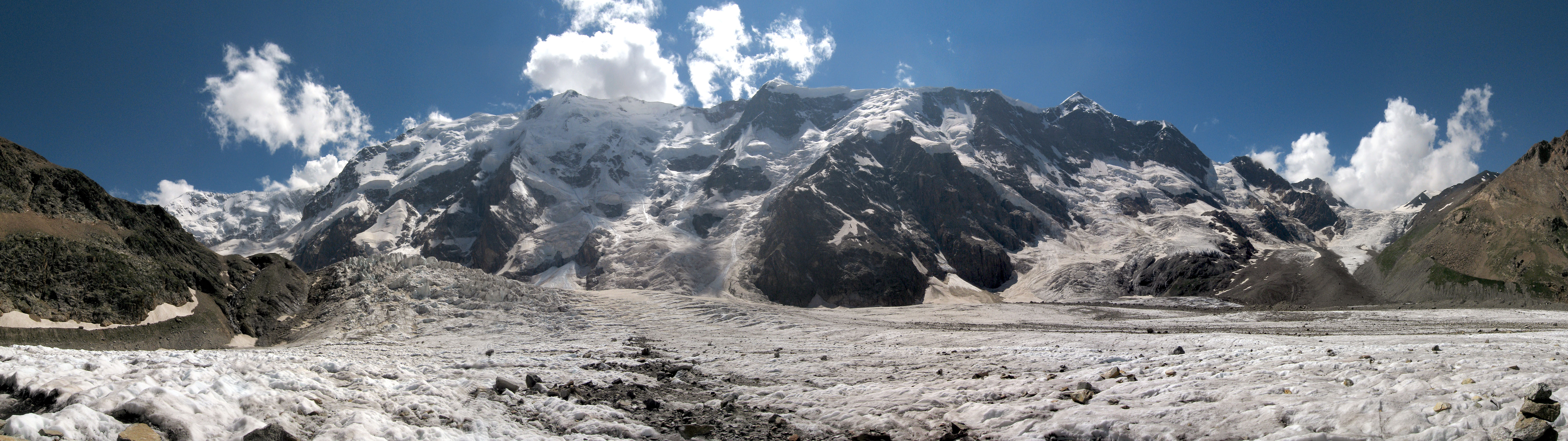
Bezengi Wall and Bezenghi Glacier

In 1939, Eugene Beletsky was arrested in connection with the "N. V. Krylenko case" and spent three months in pretrial detention in the NKVD isolation center. After the arrest of N. I. Yezhov, Beletsky was released. In early 1940, together with a group of volunteer skiers, he took part in the Winter War, was awarded the medal "For Courage".

Shortly thereafter, Beletsky received a letter from the Presidium of the Central Section of Mountaineering with information about his "rehabilitation": his case related to the traverse of the Bezenghi Wall was reviewed and he was reinstated to the titles of Master of Sports of the USSR and Senior Mountaineering Instructor. In the summer of 1940 he returned to the Caucasus, where he headed the Central School of Mountaineering Instructors of the All-Union Central Committee of the Soviet Union. After that, with a group of mountaineers, he successfully traversed both (northern and southern) peaks of Ushba. Including Beletsky, the group consisted of 12 people — it was a record for such mass climbing. When Evgeny Beletsky returned to Leningrad, he learned that his older brother Yuri, who was also involved in mountaineering, had died in Dombay while climbing Mount Belalakaya.

=== During the war ===
Evgeny Beletsky planned to spend the summer season of 1941 in the Central Caucasus, in the area of the Bezenghi Wall, where he and a group of mountaineers planned to climb Dykh-Tau and Shkhara. But these plans were interrupted by the military commissariat, which sent Beletsky to the Elbrus region, to the village of Terskol. A number of other leading mountaineers of the country were also sent there. The reason for this was the order of the General Staff of the Red Army to teach the basics of mountaineering to a group of young officers, for which a one-and-a-half month course was organized, which began on June 15. However, a week later, on June 22, the Great Patriotic War began, and the head of the course, Major General Alexei Tarasov (to whom is attributed the phrase "We will not fight on Elbrus!") decided to send the cadets to their military units, and instructors — at the disposal of military committees at the place of their assignment.

Beletsky and other mountaineers from Leningrad reported to the local military draft office upon their return to Leningrad. There they were enlisted in the 1st Mountain Rifle Brigade, which was to go to the Kola Peninsula. While they were waiting for their departure, a car from the Kirov factory came to pick up Beletsky. The chauffeur presented a stamped piece of paper, which stated that "Turner Beletsky has been booked to fulfill a special task of the command of the Leningrad Military District", which meant that he had to return to the factory. After some time, Beletsky again tried to go to the front, this time in a special ski detachment of the Baltic Fleet, but he was returned to the factory, which by then had switched to the production of tanks, so that experienced workers were urgently needed.

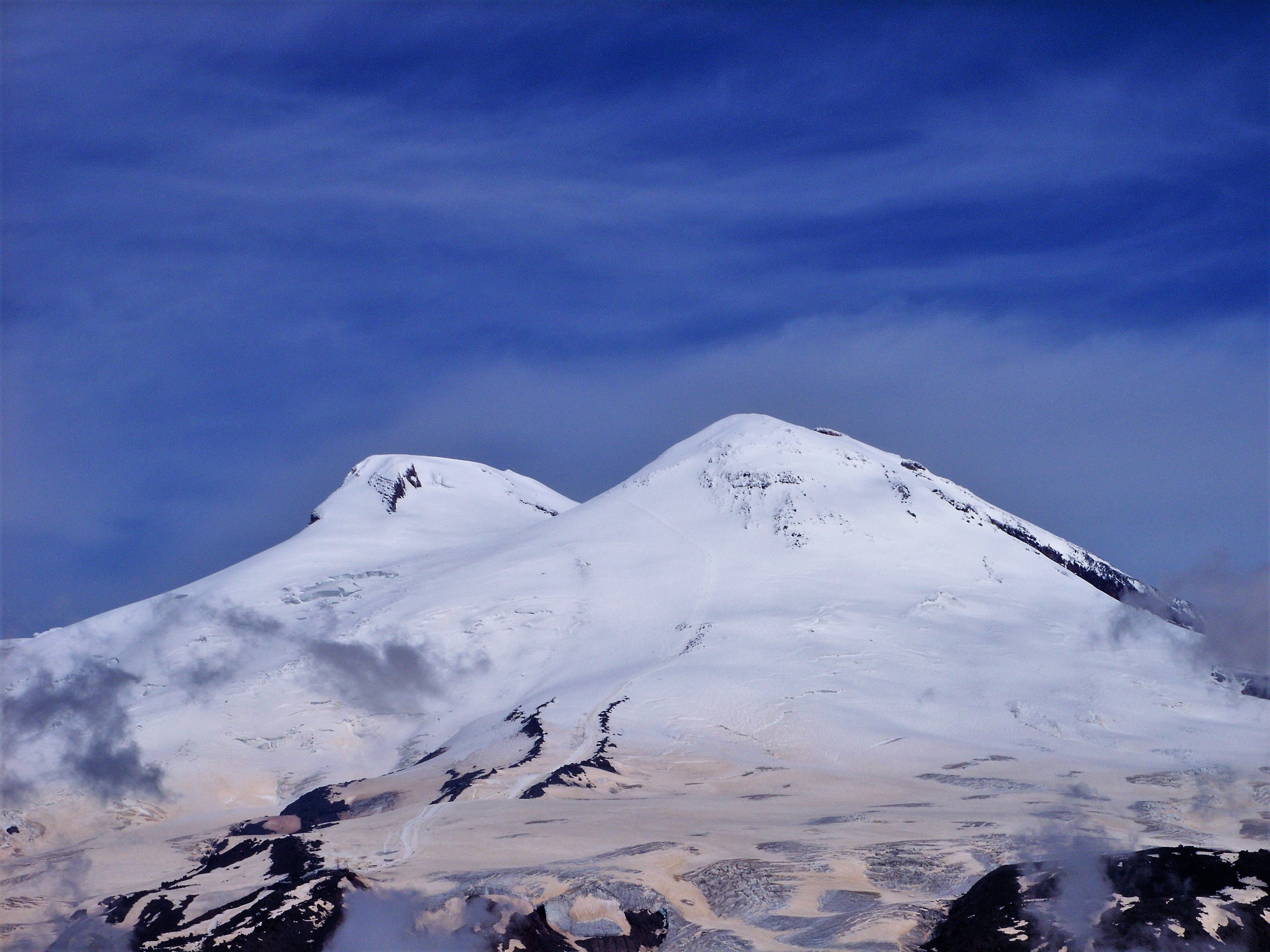
West (left) and east (right) peaks of Elbrus

In November 1941, some of the equipment from the Kirov plant was transferred to Chelyabinsk, and Beletsky arrived there by plane with other specialists. There they set up the production of KV tanks, working 10-16 hours a day, sometimes all day. Beletsky was elected a partorg of the tool shop, and he often slept at the factory in the room of the party office.

In 1942, when the Nazi troops reached the Caucasus passes, the Supreme Command Headquarters outlined a number of measures for the defense of the line of the Main Caucasian Range, which included, in particular, the involvement of experienced mountaineering instructors. Being on factory business in Moscow, Beletsky remembered himself, and after a while in Chelyabinsk came a directive "E. A. Beletsky urgently. A. Beletsky urgently sent to the disposal of the NKVD troops". Thus, from 1942 Beletsky began his service in the Separate motorized rifle brigade of special purpose. He was then sent to the Caucasus, to Tbilisi, where he participated in the training of mountain rifle detachments, and also worked as a teacher at the School of Military Mountaineering and Skiing (SHVAGLD) of the Transcaucasian Front.

In February 1943, Evgeny Beletsky was part of a group of mountaineers led by Nikolai Gusak who removed Nazi standards from the highest point in Europe, the western peak of Mount Elbrus, and planted the Soviet flag there. The group of masters of mountaineering, which included Alexander Sidorenko, Gabriel Khergiani, Beknu Khergiani and Evgeny Smirnov, set out on February 13 from the "Shelter of Eleven", located at an altitude of 4130 m on the south-eastern slope of Elbrus, and reached the western peak the same day. On the summit, the climbers found the remains of Nazi standards, which they removed and replaced with a Soviet flag, leaving a note about the successful ascent and the fulfillment of the task. On February 17, another group of climbers led by Alexander Gusev removed Nazi flags from the eastern summit of Elbrus. (Note: Alexander Gusev's group included Georgy Odnoblyudov, Boris Grachev, Viktor Kukhtin, Nikolai Morenets, Andrei Gryaznov, Anatoly Bagrov, Nikolai Persianinov, Lyubov Korotayeva, Georgy Sulakvelidze, Alexei Nemchinov, Leonid Kels, Nikita Petrosov and Vladislav Lubenets.) Based on the results of this operation, the political commissar of the group, Evgeny Beletsky (along with other climbers) was awarded the Order of the Red Star. (Note: From the Decree on the Award of the Order of the Red Star to E. A. Beletsky "In February 1943, fulfilling the task of the command of the Transcaucasian Front, Lieutenant Evgeny Andrianovich Beletsky participated in the attack on the western peak of Mount Elbrus. Overcoming minefields and barriers in conditions of low temperature, thin air and stormy weather, Comrade Beletsky climbed to an altitude of 5633 meters and with his personal participation ensured the removal of Nazi flags and the hoisting of the state flag of the USSR on the highest point in Europe".) He was appointed chief mountain training instructor of the 402nd Rifle Division.

In June 1944, some of the instructor climbers were sent to the 2nd Ukrainian Front. In Bălți, where the front headquarters was located, Beletsky met his old mountaineering friends Yakov Arkin, Alexander Sidorenko, Yuri Gubanov and Yevgeny Kolokolnikov. After that, as part of the 235th Guards Rifle Regiment, Beletsky fought in Romania, Hungary, Czechoslovakia and Austria, participated in the liberation of Budapest, Vienna and Prague. He commanded an anti-tank company, had the rank of senior lieutenant. After the victory over Germany, Beletsky was transferred to the Far East, where the war with Japan continued.

=== After the war ===
In December 1945, Evgeny Beletsky was demobilized from the army and returned to Leningrad to continue his work at the Kirov factory. In March 1946, he was awarded the title of Honored Master of Sports of the USSR "for outstanding athletic achievements and many years of social and sports activities".

In the summer and fall of 1946, two of Evgeny —Beletsky and Abalakov— were the leaders of a mountaineering expedition in the southwestern Pamirs, during which they made the first ascents of the highest point of the Rushan Range — Patkhor Peak (6080 m) and the highest point of the Shakhdara Range — Karl Marx Peak (6726 m). Besides Beletsky and Abalakov, five other members of the expedition: Anatoly Bagrov, Evgeny Ivanov, P. Semyonov, Alexander Sidorenko and Alexey Ugarov reached the summit of Karl Marx Peak. The expedition also had a scientific significance — the result of its work was the compilation of ridge and glacier diagrams of little-studied areas. After the end of the expedition, Beletsky reported on its results at a meeting of the Geographical Society of the USSR held in Leningrad. His report "On the Southwestern Pamir" was subsequently published in "Izvestiya All-Union Geographical Society".

Soon after his return from the expedition to the Southwest Pamir, Evgeny Beletsky married Elena Gusenok, who worked as a technician in the measuring laboratory of the Kirov factory. In early 1948 they had a daughter, whom they named Irina, and in December 1958 a son, Vladimir.

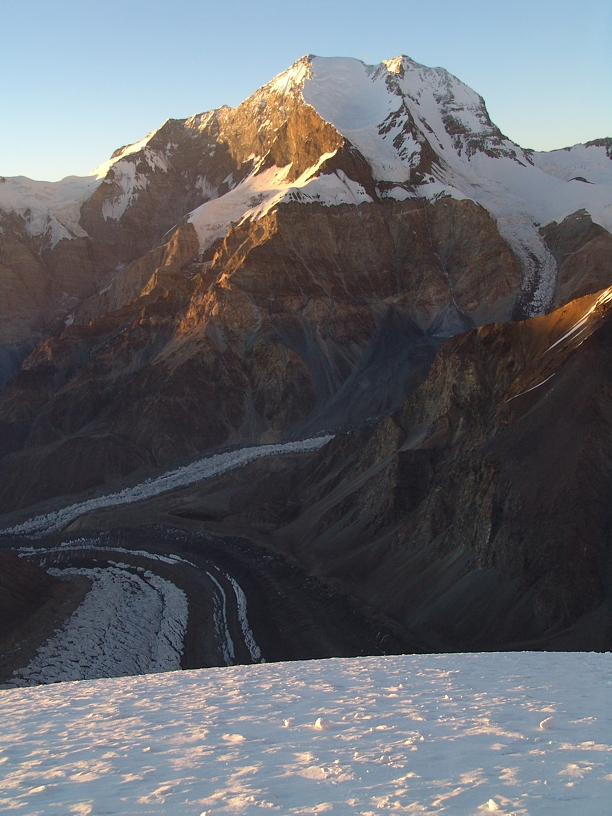
Korzhenevskiy Peak from the south

Professor Yakov Edelstein, who was appointed chairman of the Commission for High Mountain Studies of the Geographical Society of the USSR, offered Beletsky to take part in its work, which was aimed, in particular, at "eliminating the gap between departmental scientific research of mountain areas and mountaineering expeditions to these areas". Beletsky actively participated in the work of this commission. Believing that mountaineering expeditions should make their contribution to science, Beletsky presented reports at the Society's meetings and published them in its proceedings. Some time later he was elected a full member of the Geographical Society of the USSR.

In addition, Evgeny Beletsky worked on the book "Stalin Peak", in which he described not only the conquest of the highest peak of the USSR, but also the history of Pamir exploration in general. The book was published in 1951. During this period Beletsky also took an active part in the activities of the Leningrad Mountaineering Federation. During the summer months he worked as a trainer at the "Khimik" mountaineering camp in the Caucasus, and in 1952 and 1953 he was the head of the All-Union training camps for junior mountaineering instructors.

In July–August 1953, Evgeny Beletsky led the Pamir expedition of the All-Union Central Committee of Trade Unions, whose goal was to climb Korzhenevskaya Peak (7105 m) —the only unconquered seven-thousander in the Soviet Union and the fourth highest peak in the USSR. However, due to illness he was unable to take part in the final phase of the ascent— at an altitude of about six thousand meters he developed pneumonia and had to be transported to the lower camp. The Leningrad mountaineer Alexei Ugarov was appointed to lead the assault group, and on August 22, 1953, a group of eight climbers succeeded in conquering the main summit of Korzhenevskaya Peak for the first time in history. (Note: Alexei Ugarov's group included Alexander Gozhev, Boris Dmitriev, Anatoly Kovyrkov, Leonid Krasavin, Ergaliy Ryspaev, Rostislav Selidzhanov and Peter Skorobogatov.)

In 1955, by agreement between the All-China Federation of Trade Unions and the All-Union Central Council of Trade Unions, a joint summer training camp for mountaineers was organized, led by Beletsky on the Soviet side. First, a training cycle was held in the Caucasus, ending with an ascent of the western peak of Elbrus, and then the climbers flew to the Pamirs, where a joint ascent of Oktyabrsky Peak (6780 m), located at the junction of the Zulumart and Trans-Alay Range, was planned. On August 15, 1955, 14 Soviet and 4 Chinese climbers reached the summit of Oktyabrsky Peak, after which, as planned in advance, the group split: 11 climbers (seven Soviet and four Chinese) led by Beletsky descended, while a group of seven climbers led by Kirill Kuzmin continued the traverse of the Zaalai Ridge to Lenin Peak. (Note: Evgeny Beletsky's group included Anatoly Ivanov, Ram Andreev, D. Klyshko, Mikhail Shilkin, Arkady Shkrabkin and Boris Shlyaptsev, as well as Chinese climbers Zhou Zhen, Xu Ding, Shi Xu and Yang Deyuan. Kirill Kuzmin's group included Alexei Ugarov, Evgeny Ivanov, Alexander Gozhev, Boris Dmitriev, Anatoly Kovyrkov, and Pyotr Skorobogatov.) According to the results of the 1955 season, these ascents won bronze medals in the USSR mountaineering championship: Beletsky's group —in the class of high-altitude ascents, and Kuzmin's group— in the class of traverses.

When both groups were ready to leave the base camp in Osh after their ascents, a radio message came in asking the Soviet members of the expedition to fly urgently to the Tian Shan to search for the members of the Kazakh mountaineering team who had gone missing while climbing Pobeda Peak (7439 m). The team led by Beletsky flew from Osh to Almaty and reached the headwaters of the Engilchek Glacier 5th of September. By that time, it was known that only one of the 12 members of the Kazakh team had survived. During the rescue operation, a team led by Kirill Kuzmin found the bodies of two climbers frozen to the eastern ridge of Pobeda Peak and traces of others who had fallen. Beletsky later wrote that "it was a terrible payback for trying to storm the formidable seven-thousander from the start, without proper training and acclimatization hikes".

In January–February 1956, a conference on the development of high-altitude mountaineering was held in Moscow. Beletsky's report —"Review of the state of Soviet high-altitude mountaineering and tactics of high-altitude climbing"— was the first at this conference. In March 1956, at the invitation of the English Mountaineering Club, Beletsky visited Great Britain, where he gave lectures and was received by the Queen. In 1957, he was invited again by the English Mountaineering Club, this time to celebrate the club's centenary, but the trip had to be canceled due to bad weather.

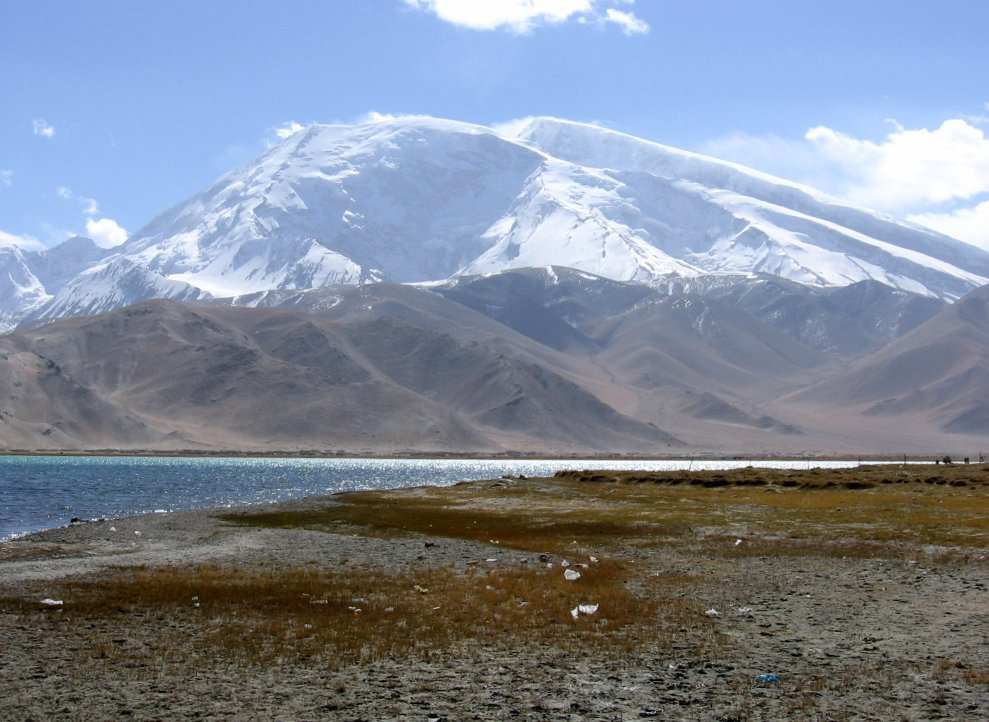
Muztagh Ata

In the summer of 1956, Evgeny Beletsky and Kirill Kuzmin led a Soviet-Chinese mountaineering expedition to the Kashgar Range, located in the Chinese part of the Pamir Mountains. The main goal of this expedition was the first ascent of the Muztagh-Ata peak (7546 m). The climbers made a number of preparatory acclimatization departures, five intermediate camps were established on the way to the summit, the last one —at an altitude of about 7200 m. Finally, on July 31, 1956, 31 climbers led by Beletsky and Kuzmin (19 Soviet and 12 Chinese participants) reached the summit— this was a record not only in terms of mass, but also in terms of the absolute altitude at which Soviet and Chinese climbers had ever been. (Note: In addition to Evgeny Beletsky and Kirill Kuzmin, Muztagh-Ata was climbed by Evgeny Ivanov, Varis Rakhimov, Alexander Gozhev, Alexander Sidorenko, Anatoly Kovyrkov, Peter Skorobogatov, Viktor Potapov, Isaak Grek, Anatoly Sevastyanov, R. G. Potapchuk, Ivan Bogachev, Valentin Kovalyov, Pavel Shumikhin, Boris Rukodelnikov, Yuri Chernoslivin, Gennady Senachev, V. D. Dmitriev, and Chinese mountaineers Shi Jen-chun, Hu Bemin, Chen Rongchang, Peng Shuli, Xu Ding, Liu Dai, Chen Deto, Liu Lianman, Peng Jumu, Shi Xu, Guo Dechun, and Wong Kinzhen.) A few days later, as part of the same expedition, a group of eight people led by Kirill Kuzmin (6 Soviet and 2 Chinese climbers) reached another seven-thousander, Kongortyube Peak (7595 m), while another group of climbers (including Beletsky) conducted research on nearby glaciers. (Note: Kirill Kuzmin, Viktor Sibiryakov, Varis Rakhimov, Viktor Potapov, Evgeny Ivanov, Boris Rukodelnikov, and Chinese climbers Chen Rong-chang and Peng Ju-mu climbed Kongortyube.)

In 1958, Beletsky was appointed one of the leaders of the Soviet part of the joint Soviet-Chinese Himalayan expedition to Jomolungma (Everest), which was to take place in 1959. In late 1958, Yevgeny Beletsky, Lev Filimonov, and Anatoly Kovyrkov, together with Chinese mountaineers, took part in the reconnaissance and planning of the route of the future expedition, exploring the upper reaches of the Rongbuk Glacier and ways of ascent to the Changla Pass (7007 m). The members of the expedition discussed the optimal ascent route, the location of the intermediate camps, and other issues. At the end of 1958 and the beginning of 1959, the selection of the participants of the future expedition was made and the preparations were in full swing. However, in March 1959 it was reported that the participation of Soviet mountaineers in the future expedition had been canceled. The reasons for this decision were not given, but as it turned out later, it was mainly due to the aggravation of the political situation in Tibet.

In 1961, Evgeny Beletsky was awarded the title of Honored Coach of the USSR. In 1962-1972 he worked as the head of the training section of the Red Star, Alibek and Tsei Alpra camps, and was also the head of the school of mountaineering instructors. In the 1970s he led several training camps in the Pamirs and the Caucasus.

Evgeny Beletsky died in Leningrad on 15 December 1979. He is buried in the Krasnenkoye cemetery.

== Achievements in sports ==
=== Climb to the seven thousand meter peaks ===
External images
- | Е. A. Beletsky, photos from 1933-1973
- | Е. A. Beletsky (left), Ullutau, 1948

- 1937: Lenin Peak (7134 m), in a group led by Lev Barkhash, which also included Stanislav Ganetsky, V. Martynov, Grigory Rozentsveig, Arii Polyakov, B. Iskin and P. Alhambrov.
- 1937: Stalin Peak (Communism Peak, now Ismoil Somoni Peak, 7495 m), in a group led by Oleg Aristov, which also included Nikolai Gusak, Viktor Kirkorov and Ivan Fedorkov (Aristov died before reaching the summit).
- 1956: Muztagh Ata (7546 m, China), leader of a group of 19 Soviet and 12 Chinese climbers.

=== USSR mountaineering championships ===
- 1955: 3rd 3rd place (altitude class), climbing Oktyabrsky Peak (6780 m), leader of the VTSPPS team, which included Anatoly Ivanov, Rem Andreev, D. Klyshko, Mikhail Shilkin, Arkady Shkrabkin and Boris Shlyaptsev.

== Awards ==
- Order of the Red Banner of Labour (27 April 1957)
- Order of the Red Star (20 March 1943)
- Medal "For Courage" (29 April 1940)
- Medal "For the Victory over Germany in the Great Patriotic War 1941–1945" (9 May 1945)

== Memorial ==
- One of the tributaries of the Korzhenevsky Glacier in the Pamir Mountains is named after Beletsky.
- The Beletsky Peak (6071 m) in the Trans-Alay Range is also named after him.
- In 2008, the St. Petersburg Mountaineering Federation established the E. A. Beletsky Medal, which is awarded "for outstanding contribution to the development of mountaineering".

== Bibliography ==
=== Cited sources ===
- Захаров П. П., Мартынов А. И., Жемчужников Ю. А. (2006). Белецкий Евгений Андрианович (in Russian). Москва: ТВТ Дивизион. p. 744. ISBN 5-98724-030-1.
- Замятин Л. М. (1987). Пик Белецкого (in Russian). Лениздат. p. 128.
- Затуловский Д. М. (1948). На ледниках и вершинах Средней Азии (in Russian). Москва: ОГИЗ/ГИГЛ. p. 292.
- Рототаев П. С. (1977). К вершинам. Хроника советского альпинизма (in Russian). Москва: Физкультура и спорт. p. 272.

=== Sources on mountaineering ===
- Белецкий Е. А., Сожин Г. (1935). Лагерь в горах (in Russian). М.: Молодая гвардия.
- Белецкий Е. А. (1951). Пик Сталина (in Russian). М.: Географгиз.
- Белецкий Е. А. (1958). Пик Ленина (in Russian) (1st ed.). М.: ГИГЛ.

=== Sources on mechanical engineering ===
- Белецкий Е. А., Харченко К. С. (1949). Современные методы механизации лекального производства (in Russian). М.: Машгиз.
- Белецкий Е. А., Харченко К. С. (1951). Оптические профилешлифовальные станки (in Russian). М.: Машгиз.

=== Articles ===
- Белецкий Е. А. (1948). По Юго-Западному Памиру (in Russian). Vol. 81. Известия Географического общества СССР.
- Белецкий Е. А. (1949). Восхождение на пик Дзержинского. К вершинам Советской земли (in Russian). М.: Географгиз.
- Белецкий Е. А.,Угаров А. С. (1954). На пик Евгении Корженевской. Побеждённые вершины (in Russian). М.: ГИГЛ.
- Белецкий Е. А. (1958). В горах Западного Китая. Труды Географического общества СССР (in Russian).
- Белецкий Е. А., Кузьмин К. К. (1959). В горах Кашгара. — Побеждённые вершины 1954—1957 (in Russian). М.: ГИГЛ.
