= Bolshoy Yugan =

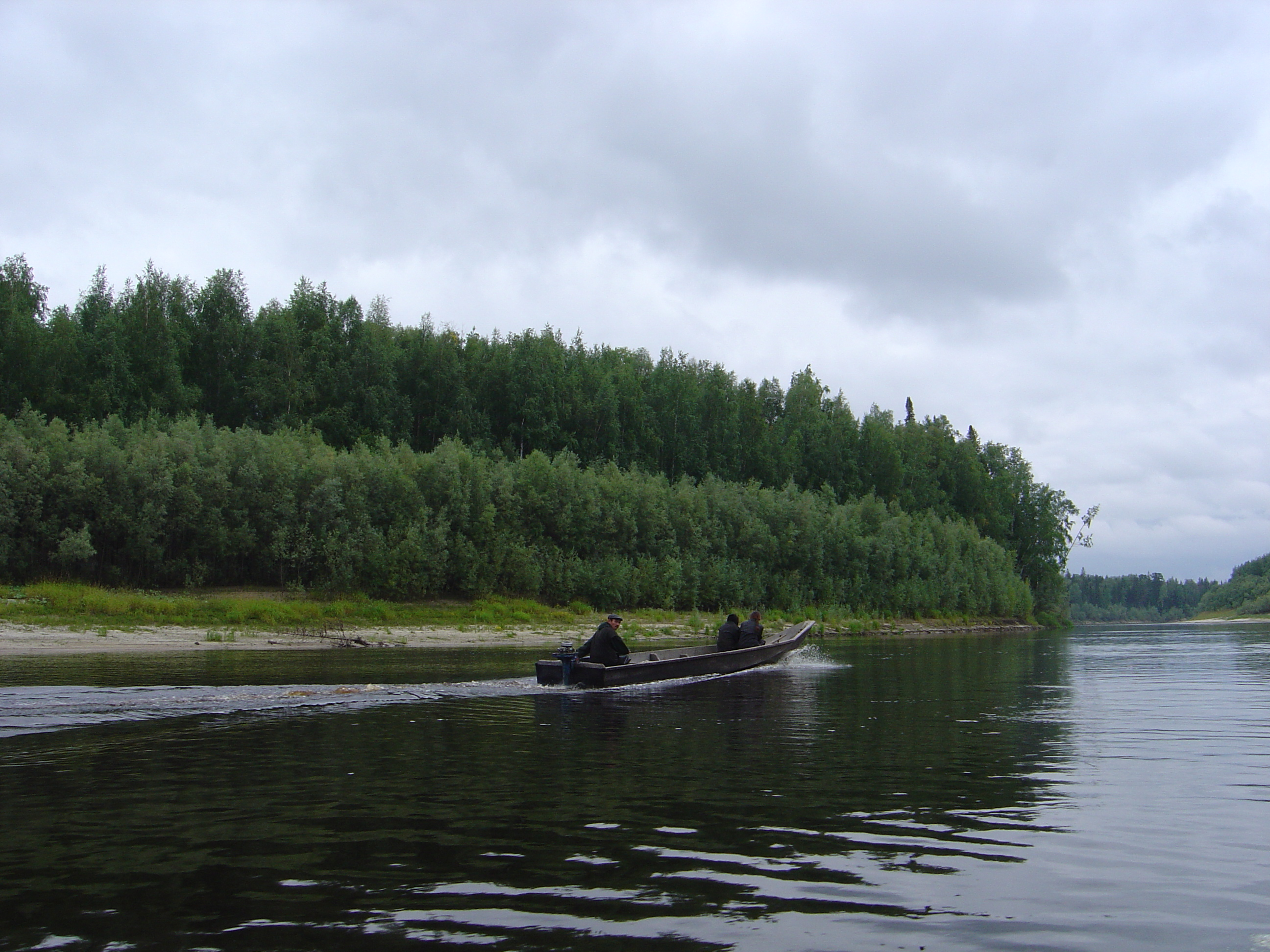

Location
- Country: Russia

Physical characteristics
- Mouth: Yuganskaya Ob
  - coordinates: 61.0667°N 73.1719°E
- Length: 1,063 km (661 mi)
- Basin size: 34,700 km^{2} (13,400 sq mi)

Basin features
- Progression: Yuganskaya Ob→ Ob→ Kara Sea

The Bolshoy Yugan is a river in Russia, it flows through the territory of Surgutsky and Nefteyugansky Districts of Khanty-Mansi Autonomous Okrug. A left tributary of the Ob, it discharges into the Yuganskaya Ob, a branch of the Ob. The length of the river is 1,063-kilometre (661 mi), its basin area is 34,700-square-kilometre (13,400 sq mi). The average annual water consumption at 118-kilometre (73 mi) from the mouth of the river is 177.67-cubic-metre-per-second (6,274 cu ft/s).

Its source is in the Vasyugan Swamp, it flows through the wetlands of the West Siberian Plain. It has many tributaries, the largest of which is the right Maly Yugan. There are about 8,000 lakes in the basin, their total area is 545-square-kilometre (210 sq mi). The river is snow fed. It stays frozen from October to early May.

Major settlements from the mouth to the source: Yugan, Maloyugansky, Ugut, Kogonchiny, Kayukovy, Taurova, Taylakovo, Larlomkiny.

== Water register data ==
According to the State Water Registry of Russia, the river is part of the Upper Ob Basin District, water management section of the river is the Ob from the city of Nefteyugansk to the confluence of the Irtysh, sub-basin of the river is the Ob below the Vakh to the confluence of the Irtysh. River basin is the (Upper) Ob to the confluence of the Irtysh.
