= Kongur Tagh =

Mountain in China

- قوڭۇر تاغ (Uyghur); Хонгор Таг (Mongolian) ཀོང་གེལ་རི་རྩེ། (Standard Tibetan) 公格尔峰 (Chinese)
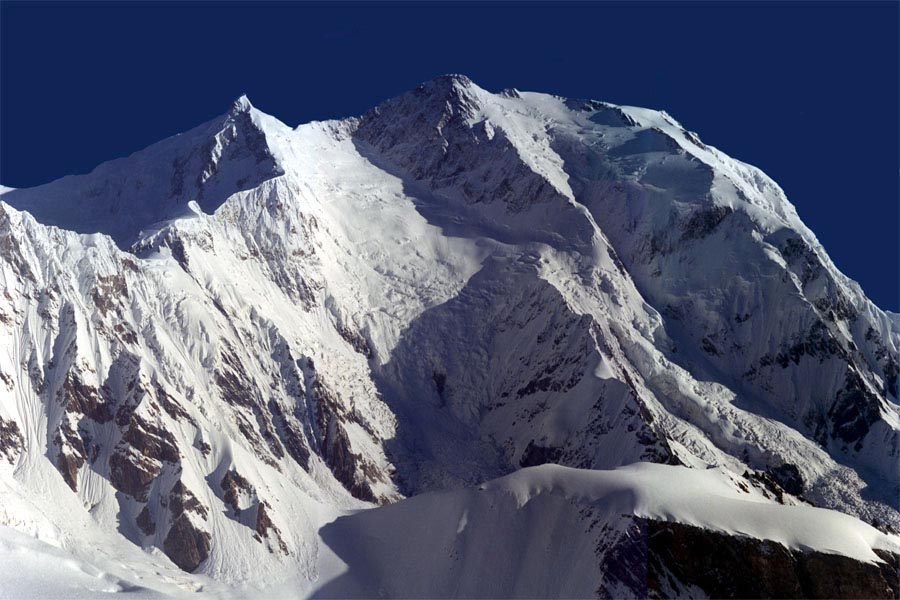
- South face of Kongur Tagh

Highest point
- Elevation: 7,649 m (25,095 ft); Ranked 37th
- Prominence: 3,585 m (11,762 ft); Ranked 49th
- Listing: Ultra
- Coordinates: 38°35′39″N 75°18′48″E

Geography
- Location within Southern Xinjiang
- Location: Akto County, Xinjiang, China
- Parent range: Pamir Mountains

Climbing
- First ascent: 1981 by British team
- Easiest route: Rock/snow/ice climb

The Kongur Tagh (meaning 'Brown Mountain' in Turkic languages) is the highest peak in the Pamir Mountains, and also the highest mountain wholly within the Xinjiang Uyghur Autonomous Region, China. With an elevation of 7,649 metres (25,095 ft), it is also the highest mountain outside of the Hindu Kush/Karakoram and Himalaya ranges.

== Geography ==
Kongur Tagh is within a range called the Kongur Shan (Chinese: 公格尔山; pinyin: Gōnggé'ěr Shān.) Kongur Tagh is located just north of Muztagh Ata and visible from Karakul Lake. Some sources use "Kongur Shan" mistakenly to refer to the peak itself. The Kongur Shan range, including Muztagh Ata, is separated by the major Yarkand River valley from the Kunlun Mountains and thus is included in the "Eastern Pamirs". Kongur Tagh is the highest peak in the Pamirs. Due to its remoteness and being hidden by nearby peaks, Kongur was not discovered by Europeans until 1900. However, the building of the Karakoram Highway from Pakistan to China, which runs past nearby Tashkurgan and Karakul Lake, has now made it more accessible.

Administratively, the Kongur Range is within Akto County.

== Climbing history ==
The first ascent of Kongur Tagh was made in 1981 by a British expedition consisting of Chris Bonington, Alan Rouse, Peter Boardman and Joe Tasker.

== Elevation ==
Kongur Tagh is 7,649 metres (25,095 ft) high. Some sources list the peak's elevation as 7,719 m (25,325 ft), but this is likely incorrect. The main summit is close enough in height to the 7,625 m (25,016 ft) high northeastern summit that climbers standing on the main summit could not tell which was taller, thus it can not be 7,719 m (25,325 ft) high.

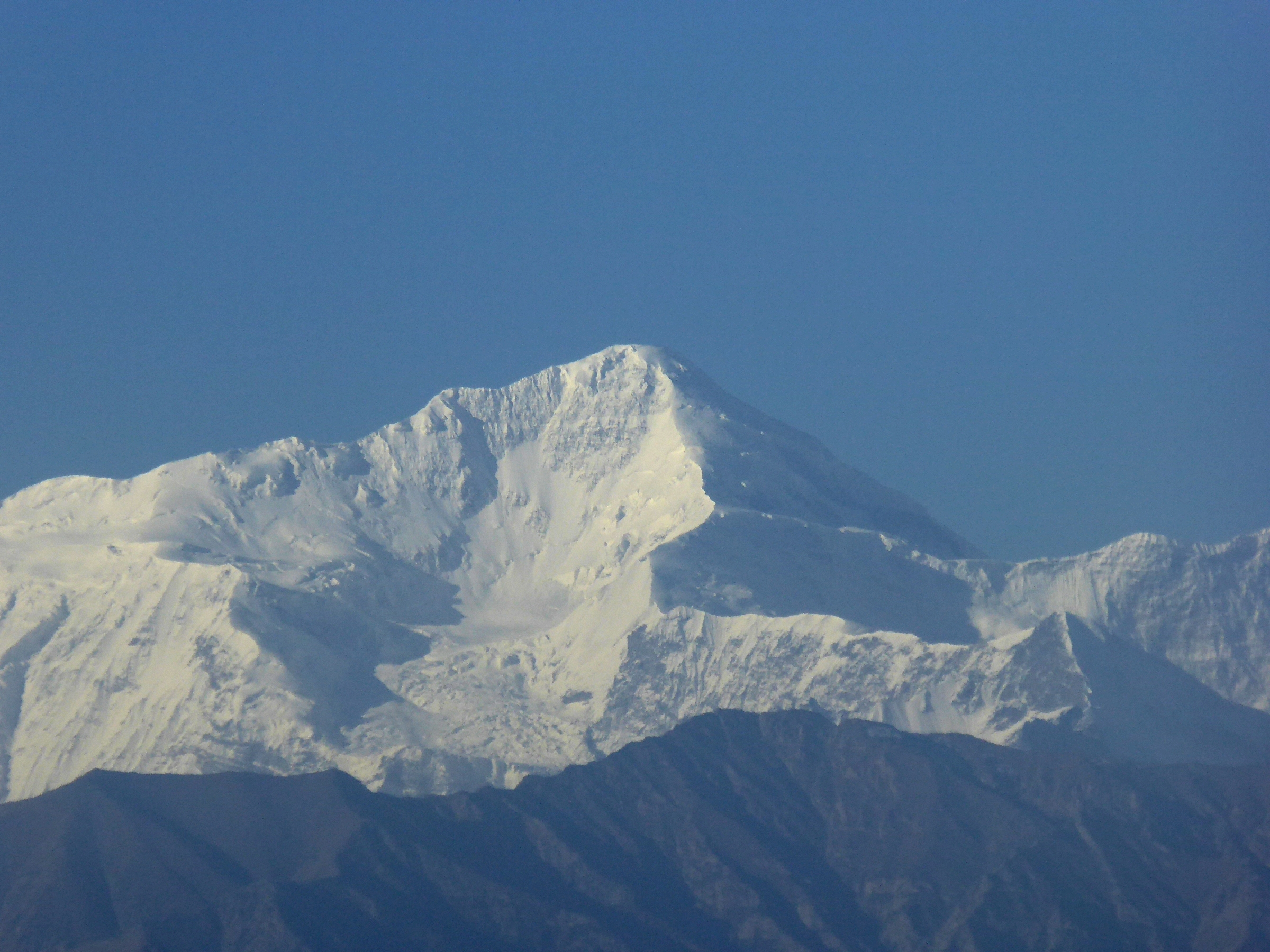
Kongur Tagh Karakoram Highway Kashgar Xinjiang China

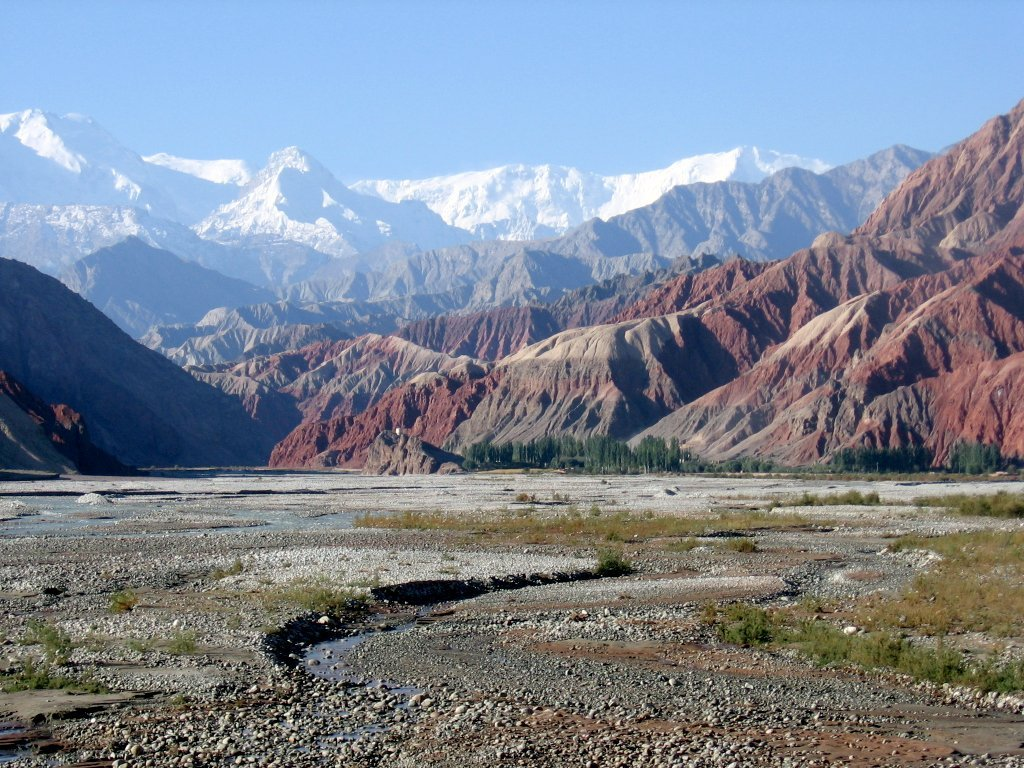
Kongur Tagh (left) and Kongur Tiube (slightly to the right) as seen from the Karakoram Highway on the way from Kashgar to lake Karakul

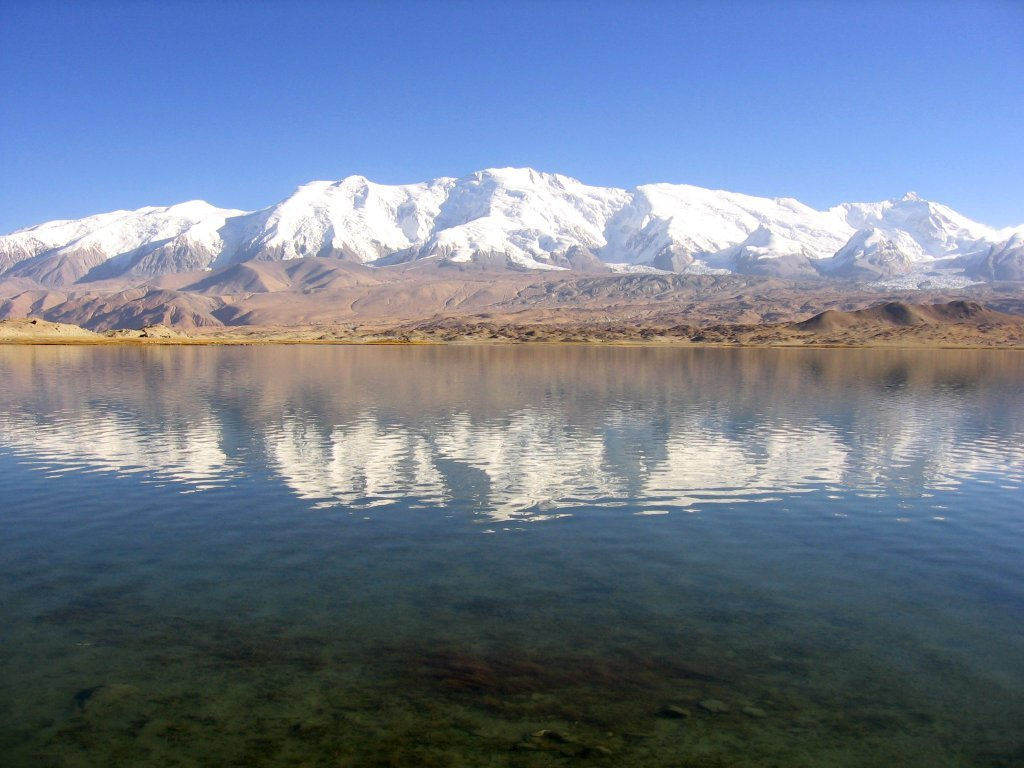
Kongur Tagh (towards the right edge of the photo) and Kongur Tiube (center) as seen from lake Karakul

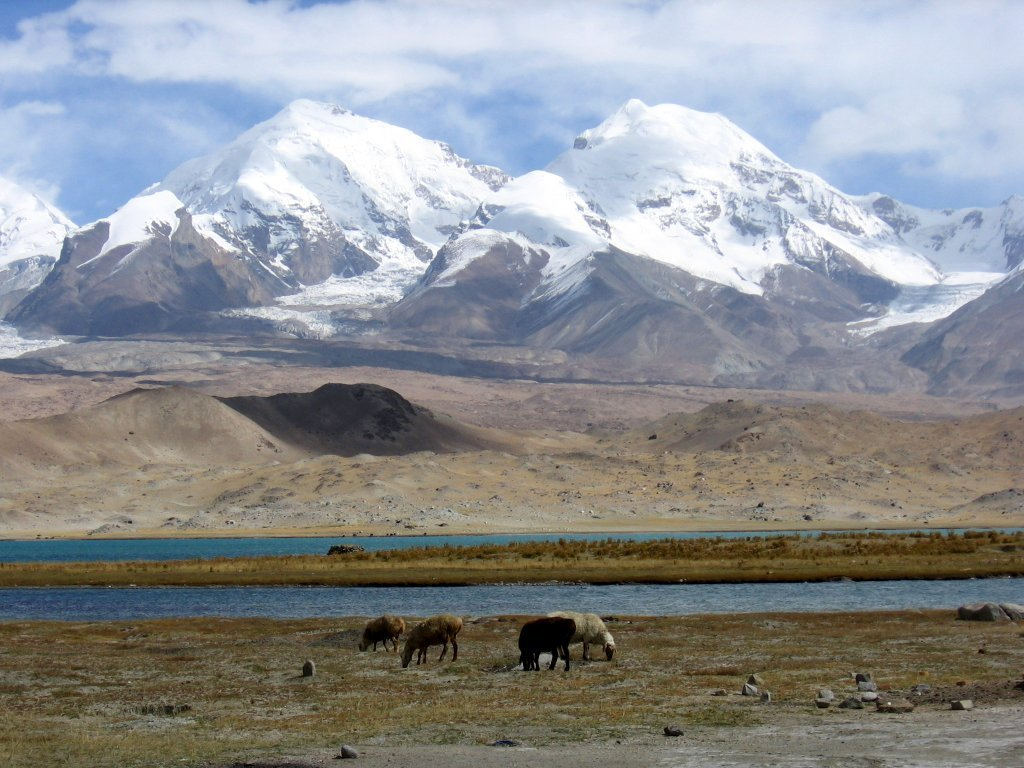
The Kongur Tagh range in 2005. The summits visible from the viewpoint on the Karakoram highway to the southwest are those of Kuk Sel (6,715 metres) and Kezi Sel (6,525 metres), about 5 km and 7 km south of the main summit.

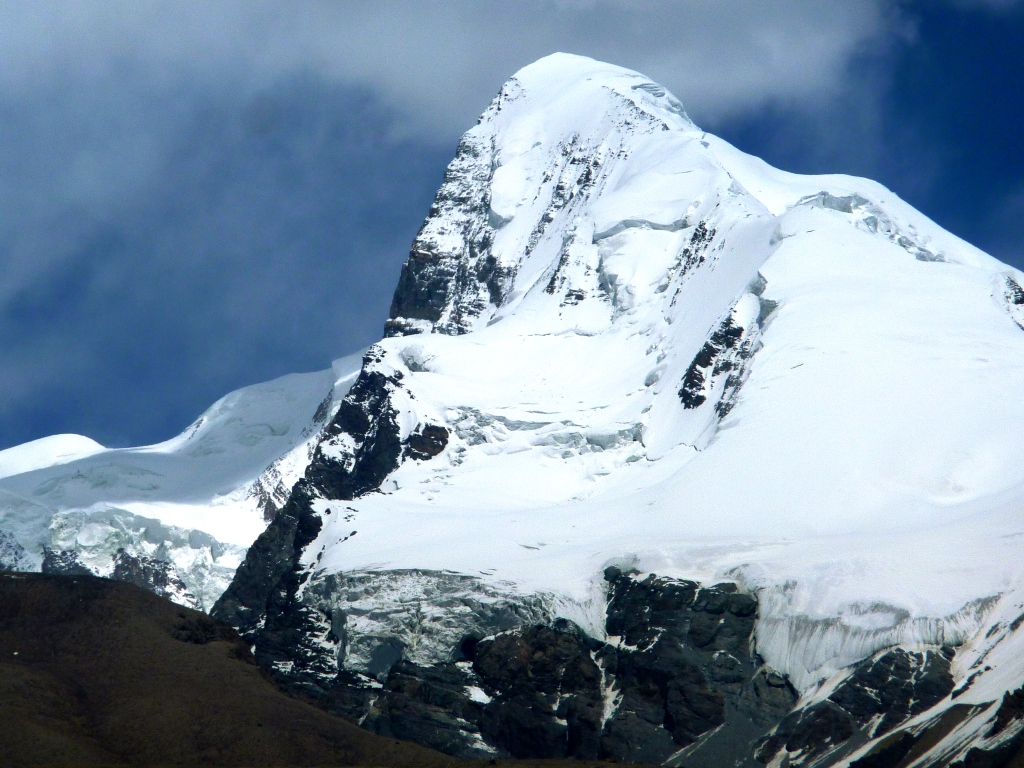
Kongur Tagh, 2011

== See also ==
- Karakoram Highway
- Kongur Tiube
