= Muztagh Ata =

Mountain in the Pamir range, located in China

- مۇزتاغ ئاتا (Uyghur) མུཛ་ཏག་རི་རྩེ། (Standard Tibetan) 慕士塔格峰 (Chinese)
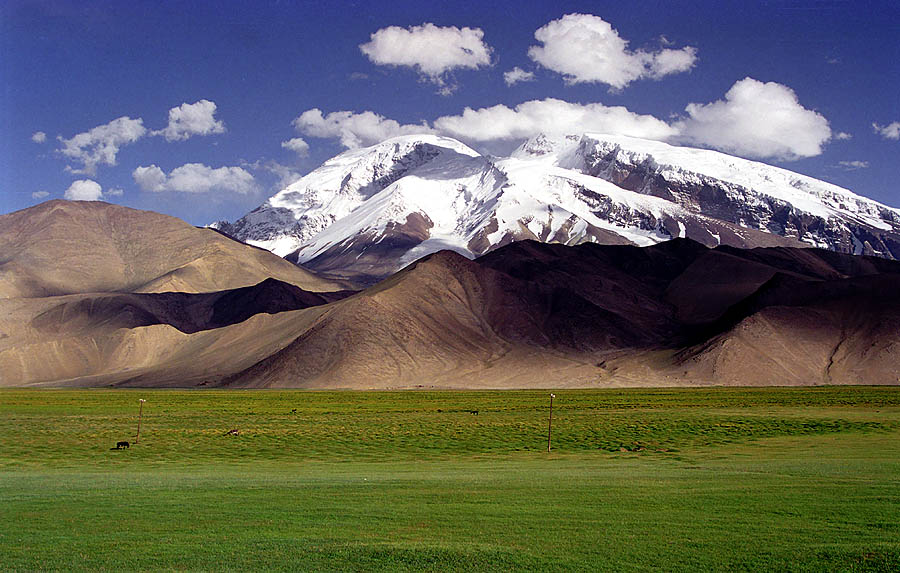
- Muztagh Ata, as viewed from the Karakoram Highway

Highest point
- Elevation: 7,546 m (24,757 ft); Ranked 49th
- Prominence: 2,698 m (8,852 ft)
- Listing: Ultra
- Coordinates: 38°16′42″N 75°06′57″E

Naming
- English translation: Father of ice mountains
- Language of name: Uyghur

Geography
- Location within Southern Xinjiang
- Location: Xinjiang, China
- Parent range: Pamir Range

Climbing
- First ascent: 1956 by E. A. Beletsky et al.
- Easiest route: Glacier/snow climb

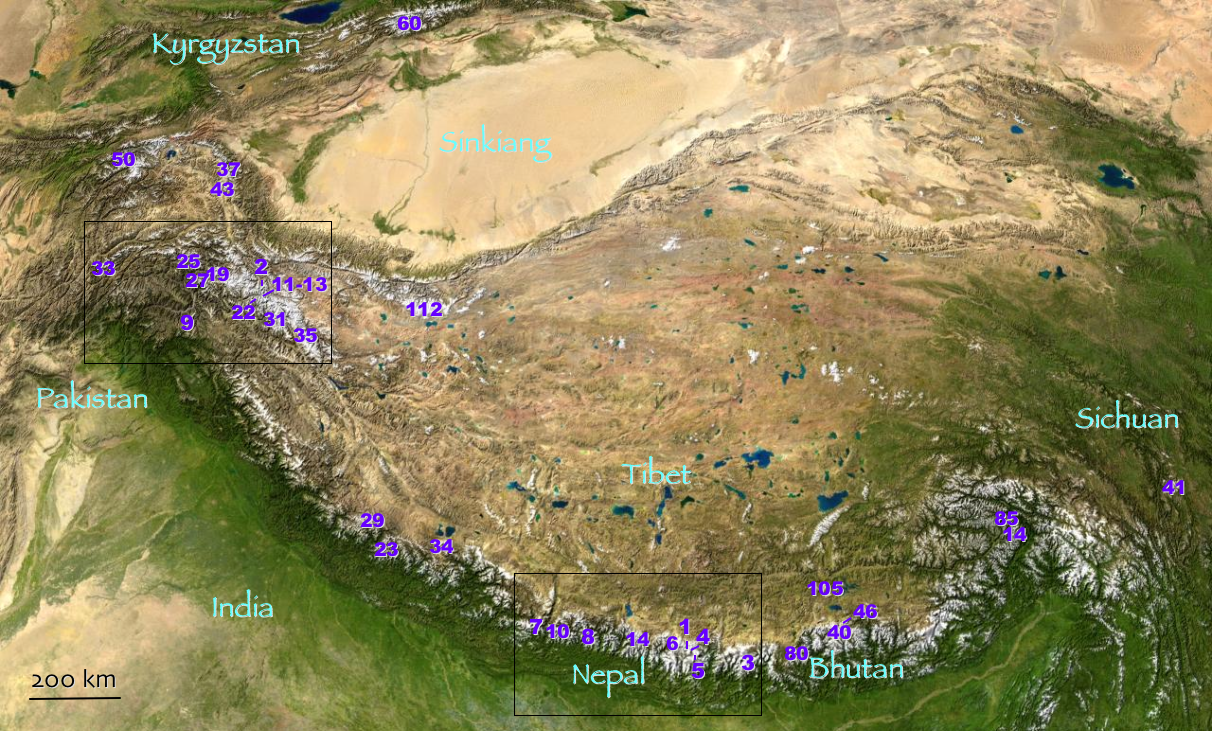
Muztagh Ata is #43 (top left area) on this location map from List of highest mountains

Muztagh Ata (meaning 'Ice Mountain Father' in Turkic languages), formerly known as Mount Tagharma and Wi-tagh, is the second highest of the mountains which form the northern edge of the Tibetan Plateau, with an elevation of 7,546 m (24,757 ft). It is sometimes regarded as being part of the Kunlun Mountains, although physically it is more closely connected to the Pamirs. It is one of the relatively easier 7,000 m peaks in the world to climb, due to its gentle western slope and the comparatively drier weather of Xinjiang, though a thorough acclimatization period and a very strong physical condition are crucial for success.

== Location ==
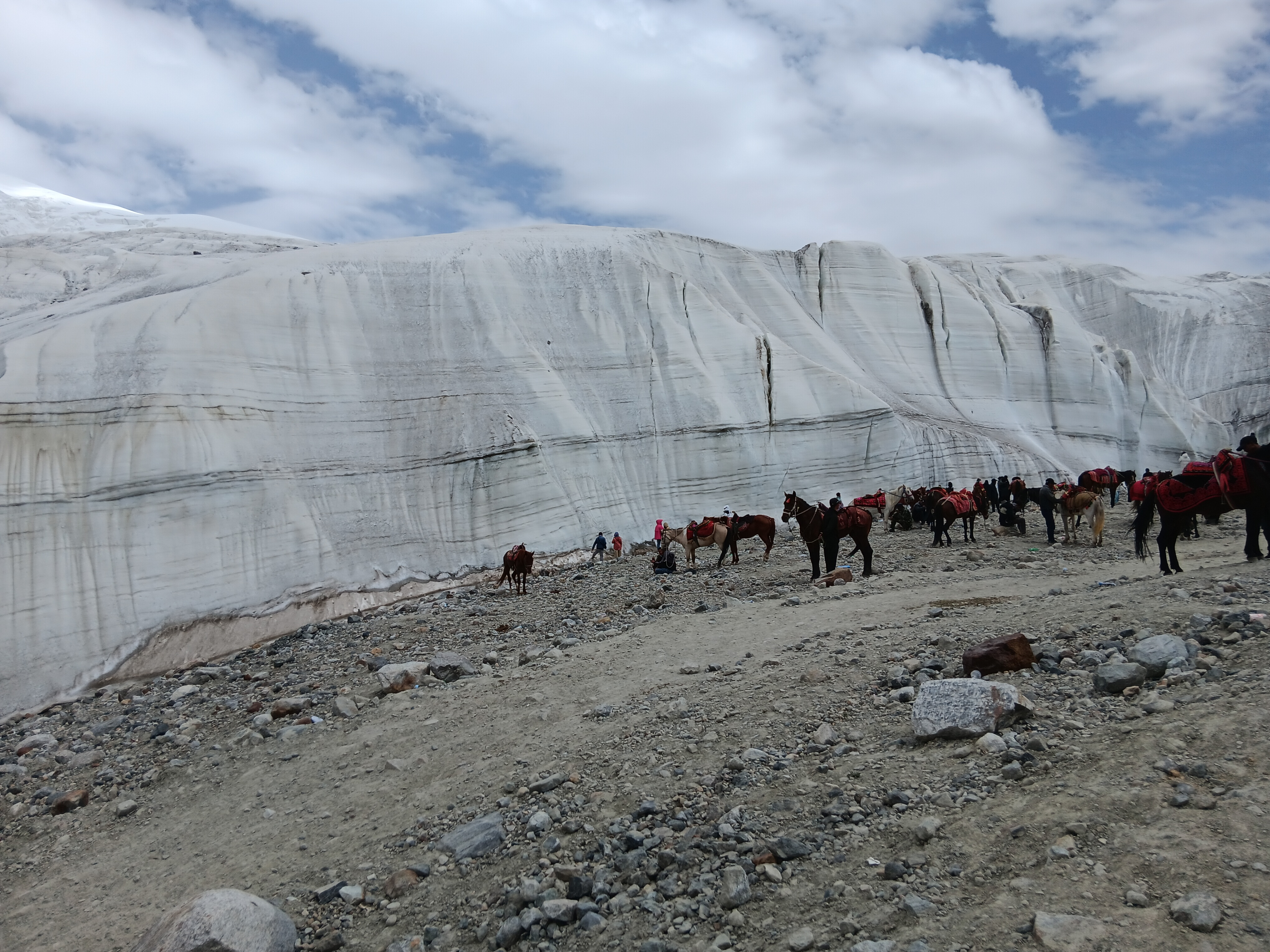
There is a glacier park located 4,688 metres above sea level.

Muztagh Ata lies just south of Kongur Tagh, the highest peak of this somewhat isolated range that is separated from the main chain of the Kunlun Mountains by the large Yarkand River valley, and thus generally included in the "Eastern Pamirs". Not far to the north and east of this group are the lowlands of the Tarim Basin and the Taklamakan Desert. The Karakoram Highway passes very close to both peaks as well as Karakul Lake, from which the mountain is conveniently viewed. The closest settlement to the mountain is Tashkurgan, the westernmost town in China located close to the border with Tajikistan and Pakistan.

== History ==
According to Michael Witzel:

the Ṛgveda mentions the mountain Mūjavant (“Having Mūja”), from where the best soma comes. A Muža tribe is also found in the Avesta in an eastern area that has Vedic-like names. The name seems to survive as the impressive 7,549-meter-high Muzh Tagh Ata Mountain in the Uyghur and Sariqoli (Saka) lands of southwestern Xinjiang.

The Swedish explorer and geographer Sven Hedin made the first recorded attempt to climb Muztagh Ata, in 1894. On his first expedition in 1900 Aurel Stein reached the summit while crossing the Karakorum Pass. Additional attempts were made in 1900, 1904 and 1947, the last by the team of Eric Shipton and Bill Tilman who came very close to the summit but were turned back due to cold and deep snow.

The first ascent of the peak was in 1956 by a large party of Chinese and Soviet climbers which included Liu Lianman and Xu Jing from China and, from the Soviet Union, Kirill Kuzmin and the expedition leader Evgeny Andrianovich Beletsky. They ascended via the west ridge, which is now the standard route.

Since the first ascent, many ascents of Muztagh Ata have been made. In 1980, a party led by Ned Gillette made a ski ascent/descent of the standard route, the first ski ascent of a mountain over 7,500 m (24,600 ft). An ascent of the much harder south-east ridge was made in 2000 and repeated in 2006. A secondary route at the west side of the mountain was first climbed in the summer of 2005. In 2011, the Swedish climber Anneli Wester camped on the summit overnight after climbing the mountain solo and alpine style. In 2013, Aron Ralston, the man who amputated his own arm during a hiking accident in 2003, made the summit without his compatriot Michael Ash, who sustained a lung injury and was forced to return to base camp.
