= Lyudmila Agranovskaya =

Soviet mountain climber (1932–2022)

- Людмила Семёновна Аграновская
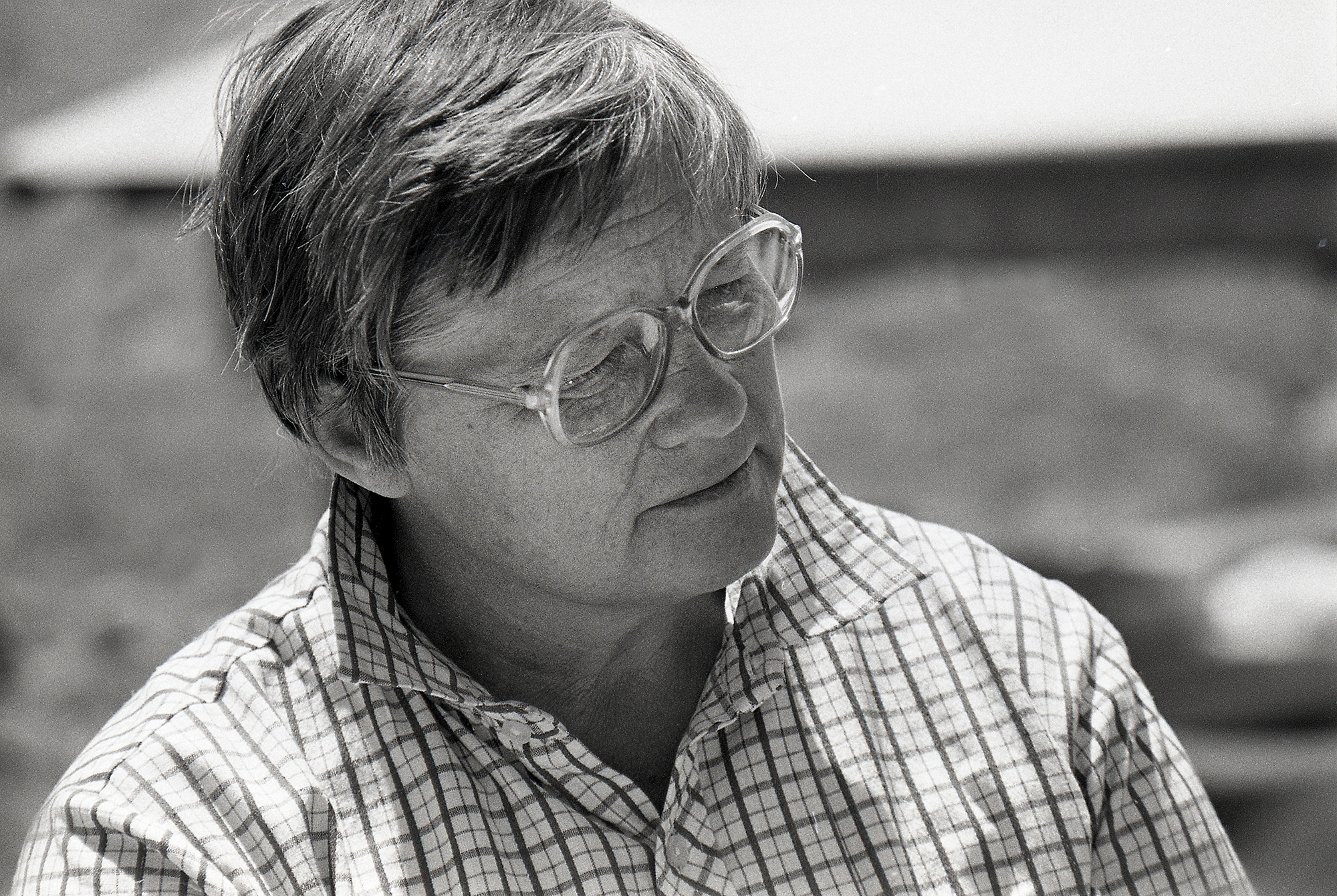
- Agranovskaya in 1988
- Born: Lyudmila Semyonovna Agranovskaya; 29 February 1932; Sakhalin, Sakhalin Oblast, Russian SFSR, Soviet Union
- Died: 18 December 2022 (aged 90); Kamchatka Krai, Russia
- Citizenship: Soviet Union; Russia
- Spouse: German Agranovsky (m. 1956)
- Children: 1

Lyudmila Semyonovna Agranovskaya (née Smolinova; Russian: Людмила Семёновна Аграновская; 29 February 1932 – 18 December 2022) was a Soviet and Russian mountaineer and coach. She was the first woman in the USSR to receive the Snow Leopard award (1970). She was an Honored Master of Sport of the USSR, Honored Coach of the RSFSR, and Honorary Citizen of Petropavlovsk-Kamchatsky (2006).

== Biography ==
Lyudmila Agranovskaya was born on February 29, 1932, on Sakhalin Island, where her father, an engineer, was part of an oil exploration expedition. From 1934 to 1954, she lived and studied in Moscow, where she initially took up acrobatics, gymnastics, and dance, later transitioning to sailing and alpine skiing. From the age of 14, she worked at an aircraft factory.

In 1948, she participated in the Krylya Sovetov (Wings of the Soviets) alpine skiing competitions in Kuybyshev, where she placed third. Subsequently, she was selected for the national trade unions team and participated in the USSR Alpine Skiing Championship in Alma-Ata.

From 1954 to 1968, she worked as a street cleaner in Leningrad. In 1955, she began mountaineering in the Caucasus. It was there, at a mountaineering camp, that she met German Agranovsky, who was serving in the navy at the time and later also became a renowned athlete. They married on June 1, 1956, and their daughter Olya was born a year later.

In 1961, she graduated from the School of Mountaineering Instructors.

In 1968, she moved to Kamchatka, where she was involved in organizing a specialized Children and Youth Sports School of the Olympic Reserve and the construction of the "Edelweiss" ski complex in Petropavlovsk-Kamchatsky.

Agranovskaya summited seven peaks exceeding 7,000 meters, leading five of these ascents. In 1970, she became the first woman to reach the summit of Pik Kommunizma (Communism Peak), then the highest point in the Soviet Union. She was also the first woman in the country to receive the prestigious "Snow Leopard" title (badge No. 16), an award recognizing ascents of all Soviet 7,000-meter peaks. Her other notable high-altitude climbs include:

- Lenin Peak (1960, 1971)
- Karl Marx Peak (1964)
- Pik Kommunizma via the South Ridge from Bivachny Glacier (1968)
- Pobeda Peak via the North Ridge from Zvyozdochka Glacier (1970)
- Peak Korzhenevskaya via the South Ridge (1972)
- Pik Kommunizma again, this time via the "Burevestnik" (Petrel) Ridge (1972)
- Khan Tengri via the southwest slope (1973).

She authored numerous specialized articles on mountaineering and co-authored a methodology for alpine ski training for children.

She was awarded the "Honored Master of Sport of the USSR" badge and the Grand Gold Medal of the USSR Sports Committee "For Outstanding Sporting Achievements." She also held the honorary title "Honored Worker of Physical Culture of the USSR" (1986).

In 2006, she was granted the title of Honorary Citizen of Petropavlovsk-Kamchatsky.

Together with her husband, she coached for over 40 years. Their students included Varvara Zelenskaya, an Honored Master of Sport in alpine skiing and a multiple World Cup stage winner; and Natalya Buga and Ksenia Shlyakhtina, both Masters of Sport of International Class. For their work in training these athletes, the Agranovskys were awarded the title "Honored Coach of Russia".

She died on December 18, 2022, at the age of 90. Her ashes were scattered on the summit of Mount Everest by mountaineer Vitaly Lazo.

=== Family ===
Her husband was German Agranovsky (1931–1984), a mountaineer and coach. Her daughter, Olga, and grandsons, German and Semyon, also dedicated their lives to sports.
