= Nasuh Mahruki =

Turkish mountaineer,writer, photographer and documentary film producer (born 1968)

Ali Nasuh Mahruki
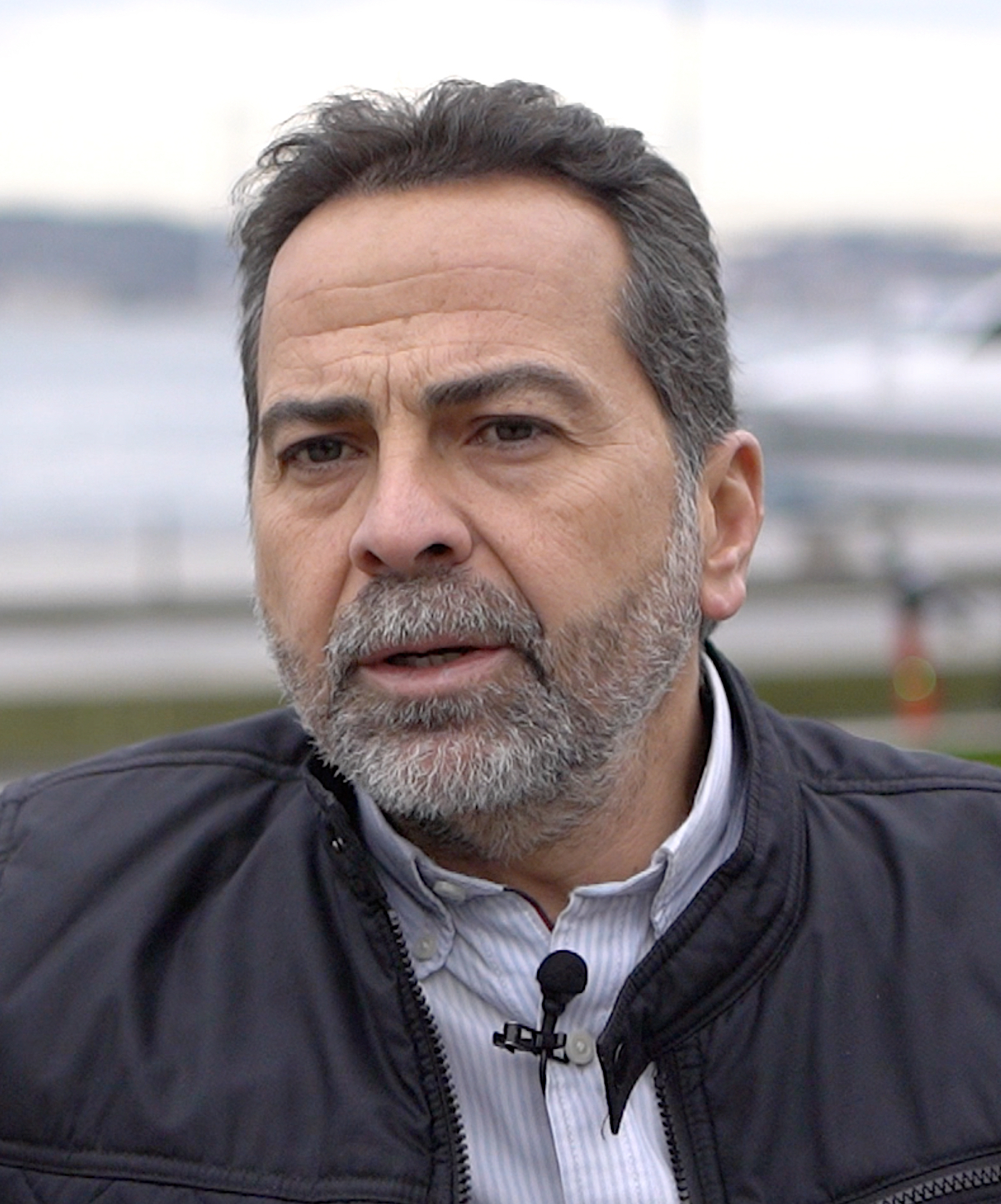
- Nasuh Mahruki (2024)

Personal information
- Nationality: Turkish
- Born: 21 May 1968 (age 58) Istanbul, Turkey

Climbing career
- Type of climber: Mountaineering
- Major ascents: Mount Everest (8,848 m),, Khan Tengri (7,010 m), Lenin Peak (7,134 m), Peak Korzhenevskaya (7,105 m), Communism Peak (7,495 m), Peak Pobeda (7,439 m), Aconcagua (6,959 m), Vinson Massif (4,897 m), Kilimanjaro (5,895 m), McKinley (6,194 m), Elbrus (5,642 m), Puncak Jaya (4,884 m), Cho Oyu (8,201 m), Lhotse (8,516 m), K2 (8,611 m)

Ali Nasuh Mahruki (born 21 May 1968) is a professional mountaineer, writer, photographer and documentary film producer. He climbed to the summit of Mount Everest and was the first ever Turkish person to climb the Seven Summits.

== Early life ==
He was born on 21 May 1968 in Istanbul. He is a fifth generation descendant of Admiral Nasuhzade Ali Pasha, commander of the Ottoman navy during Sultan Mahmud II.

After finishing high school at Şişli Terakki High School in Istanbul in 1987, Mahruki attended the School of Business Administration at Bilkent University in Ankara, and graduated in 1992. During his time at the university, he was introduced to mountain climbing in the university climbing club and later became club president.

== Mountaineering career ==
Between 1992 and 1994, Mahruki climbed the five highest former Soviet mountains in Asia (Khan Tengri, Lenin Peak, Peak Korzhenevskaya, Communism Peak and Peak Pobeda), which are all over 7,000 metres high. This achievement gained him the honorific title "Snow Leopard", awarded by the Russian Climbing Federation.

Mahruki reached the summit of Mount Everest (8,848 m.) on 17 May 1995, being the first ever Turkish and Muslim person to do so. In 1996, he completed the climbing of Seven Summits in seven continents (Everest, Aconcagua, Vinson Massif, Kilimanjaro, McKinley, Elbrus and Puncak Jaya).

In 1997, he climbed Cho Oyu solo, setting a Turkish record. He next ascended Lhotse without an oxygen tank in 1998 and climbed K2 in 2000.

He was the president of AKUT, a voluntary search-and-rescue organization based in Istanbul he co-founded in 1996.

Mahruki has published seven books and many articles about his outdoor challenges and travels.

== Notable ascents ==
1. Little Demirkazık (3,425 m) West face climb Niğde, Turkey July 1991
2. Five climbs on Terskey Ala Too mountains: Uglawaya (3,900 m), Peak Studentin (4,202 m), Brigandina-Albatros traverse (4,800-4,740 m), Cigid (5,170 m), Kazakhstan, July 1991
3. First Turkish ascent of Khan Tengri (7,010 m), Kyrgyzstan, August 1992
4. Great Demirkazık North Face climb (3,756 m), Niğde Turkey, September 1992
5. Winter ascent of Mount Elbrus (5,621 m), Caucasus, February 1993
6. Lenin Peak (7,134 m), Kyrgyzstan, July 1993
7. First Turkish ascent of Vaja Psavela (6,912 m), Kyrgyzstan, August 1993
8. First Turkish ascent of Peak of Four (6,299 m), Kyrgyzstan, July 1994
9. First Turkish ascent of Peak Korzhenevskaya (7,105 m), Tajikistan, July 1994
10. Peak Communism (7,495 m), Tajikistan, July 1994
11. Solo and first Turkish ascent of Peak Pobeda (7,439 m), Kyrgyzstan, August 1994
12. First Turkish winter ascent of Mount Damavand (5,610 m), Iran December 1994
13. Mount Erciyes (3,916 m), North icefall winter ascent, Kayseri, February 1995
14. Completed the "Seven Summits" project of climbing the highest peaks of each of the continents, in November 1996. The mountains are:
  1. Mt. Everest (8,848 m), Tibet, Asia, 17 May 1995. First Turkish ascent
  2. Aconcagua (6,959 m), Argentina, South America, November 1995. First Turkish ascent
  3. Vinson Massif (4,897 m), Antarctica, December 1995. First Turkish ascent
  4. McKinley (6,194 m), Alaska, North America, January 1996 First Turkish ascent
  5. Kilimanjaro (5,895 m), Tanzania, Africa, August 1996
  6. Elbrus (5,642 m) Caucasus, Europe, August 1996
  7. Carstensz Pyramid (4,884 m) Oceania, November 1996
15. Great Demirkazık (3,756 m), Peck route first winter ascent, Niğde, Turkey, December 1996.
16. Güzeller (3,461 m), North face first winter ascent, Niğde, Turkey, February 1997.
17. Solo ascent of Cho Oyu (8,201 m), Tibet, 6th highest mountain of the world. The highest solo ascent of Turkey. September 1997, without oxygen. First Turkish ascent
18. Lhotse (8,516 m), 4th highest mountain of the world. West face, Nepal, May 1998, The highest oxygenless ascent of Turkey. First Turkish ascent
19. Attempted Manaslu (8,163 m), Nepal October 1998.
20. Mount Damavand (5,610 m), Iran January 2000
21. Winter ascent of Mount Ararat (Ağrı Dağı) (5,137 m), Turkey February 2000
22. First Turkish ascent of extremely dangerous and difficult K2 (8,611 m), Pakistan July 2000. 2nd the highest mountain in the world, The highest oxygenless ascent by a Turkish national.
23. Muztagh Ata (7,546 m), China August 2001. First Turkish ascent. Highest ski-ascent of Turkey.

== Books ==
- Diary of an Alpinist (Yapi Kredi Press, 1995)
- First Turk on Everest (Yapi Kredi Press, 1995)
- In Search of a Dream (Yapi Kredi Press, 1996)
- Roads of Asia, Himalayas, and Beyond (Yapi Kredi Press, 1999)
- Earth Diary (KAPITAL Press, 2002)
- Motherland is only to be loved by actions, not by empty words (GUNCEL YAYINCILIK, 2007)

== Awards ==
- "Best Climber of Turkey" and was nominated as a candidate for the "Best Sportsman of Turkey", 1992 and 1994. (No elections in 1993)
- "Snow Leopard" by the Russian Mountaineering Federation after completing the ascents of 5 seven thousand meter peaks of the CIS, August 1994. At that time there were overall 214 climbers who were awarded with that title of which 3 were Western climbers.
- Ashoka Fellow with Ashoka Turkey since 2004

== Arrests ==
Nasuh Mahruki was arrested on November 20, 2024, on charges of publicly disseminating misleading information to the public. On December 5, he was ordered to be released.

On July 17, 2026, Nasuh Mahruki was arrested and jailed following a social media post questioning the 2016 coup attempt. During his imprisonment in Silivri Prison, he reported severe conditions, stating that he had to sleep on the floor and was bitten by bedbugs for 13 days. He was subsequently released on September 16, 2026.

== See also ==
- Tunç Fındık
