= Elvira Nasonova =

Soviet, Russian and Ukrainian alpinist

- Эльвира Насонова
- Born: July 19, 1941 (age 84); Vozdvizhanka, Primorsky Krai, USSR
- Occupation(s): geophysic, mountaineer, industrial climber, coach
- Awards: Master of Sports of the USSR, "Snow Leopard" (for three times)

Elvira Timofeevna Nasonova (Russian: Эльви́ра Тимофе́евна Насо́нова; born July 19, 1941) is a Soviet, Ukrainian, and Russian mountaineer, and the only woman in the world to have been awarded the title "Snow Leopard" for three times.

She is a medalist in the USSR Alpine Championships and a multiple-time champion of Ukraine. She was a participant and later a coach of the Soviet women's alpine team and took part in numerous training camps. She has lived in Alushta, Crimea, for many years, where she led the Alushta rescue team and chaired the Alushta Everest Alpine Club. In the 1960s, she was a pioneer of industrial climbing in the USSR and participated in high-altitude work during the construction of the At-Bashi and Toktogul hydroelectric power stations. Since the 1990s, she has managed a commercial group of industrial climbers that has performed various high-altitude tasks in Crimea, including work on the domes of Saint Peter and Paul Cathedral in Simferopol, the Alexander Nevsky Cathedral in Yalta, and the Alushta Hotel. She is a geophysicist by education and has authored several publications in alpine periodicals. She is married with mountaineer Anatoly Balinsky (1934–1984).

== Biography ==
Elvira Nasonova was born on July 19, 1941, in the village of Vozdvizhanka, Primorsky Krai. Since 1955, she has lived permanently in Alushta, although she was often away on extended expeditions. She graduated from the Kiev Geological Exploration College in 1962, specializing in geophysics. She worked in geological exploration at the "Kyrgyzneft" company. She began mountaineering in 1960 and had an active sports career for nearly 45 years.

Holding the title of a top-level coach, she worked in alpine camps such as "Dugoba" and "Ala-Archa," and served as a rescue coach in the "Vysotnik" Alpine Club (Lenin Peak) and the "Tian Shan" Alpine Club, participating in numerous rescue operations. She established the first alpine and climbing section in Alushta, where she was the permanent coach. She also founded the Everest Alpine Club, where she serves as the chairperson. Nasonova is an active promoter of mountaineering and climbing.

=== Work in the control and rescue service ===
Nasonova has a specialization as a mountain rescuer. From 1976 to 1985, she headed the Alushta Control and Rescue Squad (CRS) and personally participated in rescue operations for those in distress in the Crimean Mountains more than 30 times. The specific tasks of the CRS in Crimea, unlike those in high mountains, involve rescuing unprepared tourists from vertical cliffs, extracting victims from caves, and extinguishing forest fires on hard-to-reach slopes. Before Nasonova, there were no recorded cases of women holding such a position in Soviet mountaineering practice.

In 1995, her friend, Bulgarian climber Iordanka Dimitrova, perished on Kanchenjunga. Her body was at an altitude of 7,000 meters. The only options for recovering the body were to fund a special expedition or attempt the recovery personally. In 1996, Nasonova attempted to parachute from the shoulder of Everest using a paraglider. The attempt was unsuccessful; a gust of wind threw Nasonova and her instructor, V. Bozhukov, against a rock, causing the parachute to collapse and both pilots to fall 50 meters onto a glacier. Nasonova sustained severe injuries and waited on the glacier for three days, as transport without a helicopter was impossible. Later, in Moscow, she underwent a series of complex surgeries. Iordanka Dimitrova's body was eventually found by Italian climbers.

=== Industrial climbing ===
Elvira Nasonova, along with her husband Anatoly Balinsky, applied their accumulated sports experience to a new activity for the 1960s, working as climbing instructors in the construction of the future At-Bashy and Toktogul hydropower plants from 1964 to 1972. She provided initial climbing training for more than a thousand builders, who often worked on sheer rock faces, and she was responsible for their safety.

Since the 1990s and to the present day, Nasonova has been leading a team of high-altitude climbers that performs vertical work on unique and historical sites in Crimea: the domes of the Saint Peter and Paul Cathedral in Simferopol, the Alexander Nevsky Cathedral in Yalta, and the facades of the high-rise Alushta Hotel. The team also installs attractions at the Alushta water park and provides engineering reinforcement of rock walls with the risk of rockfalls.

Despite being in her eighties, Nasonova personally ascends to the sites, performing the full scope of work as an industrial climber.

=== Social activity ===
In the 1970s, the first mountaineering section was established in Alushta, with Nasonova becoming its coach. She is also the chairperson of the Alushta Mountaineering Club "Everest" and has authored several publications on mountaineering topics in periodicals.

== Achievements ==
She has been involved in mountaineering since 1960, when she made her first ascent to the summit of Gumachi Peak under the guidance of instructor Mirgorodsky. She trained as part of the Kyiv camps under Boris Subortovich and Svetlana Grechanovskaya. In 1963, she graduated from the All-Union Central Council of Trade Unions' Mountaineering Instructors School. She was awarded the title of "Master of Sports of the USSR" on November 18, 1966.

Elvira's athletic record includes more than 50 ascents of 5th and 6th-grade difficulty. She has completed 18 ascents of the USSR's seven-thousanders:

- Victory Peak — 3 climbs;
- Ismoil Somoni Peak — 3 climbs;
- Peak Ozodi — 3 climbs;
- Lenin Peak — 4 climbs;
- Khan Tengri — 5 climbs.

She became a prize-winner in the USSR Mountaineering Championship and is a multiple-time champion of Ukraine:

- 1969 — 3rd place in the USSR Championship (traverse class).
- 1971 — 2nd place in the USSR Championship (traverse class).

In 1971, she achieved the men's norms for Master of Sports of the USSR. She completed the norms for Master of Sports of the USSR seven times based on the total number of ascents of the highest categories. She is the only woman alpinist in the world to have been awarded the title of "Snow Leopard" three times. In 1973, she received her first "Snow Leopard" title. She is a 1st category instructor-methodologist in mountaineering and a high-level coach.

In 1974, the all-female team led by Elvira Shataeva was caught in a blizzard on the summit of Lenin Peak. All eight high-class climbers perished. The USSR Mountaineering Federation then banned ascents by all-female groups, requiring them to be accompanied by men.

== Recognition ==
- Elvira Nasonova appeared twice on the front page of the newspaper Komsomolskaya Pravda: on May 17, 1967, in an editorial article about the construction of the Toktogul Hydroelectric Power Station, and on March 8, 2016.
- In 2011, on the 70th anniversary of her birth, Elvira Nasonova, a Master of Sports in mountaineering, was awarded a commendation by the Chairman of the Council of Ministers of the Autonomous Republic of Crimea for "exemplary performance of official duties, high professionalism, and significant personal contribution to the socio-economic development of the Autonomous Republic of Crimea."
- By decree of the Federation of Mountaineering of Russia, she was awarded the medal "For Achievements in Sport."
- Her activities and achievements are highlighted on a stand in the exhibition of the Alushta Local History Museum, and in 2015, a large specialized exhibition was held dedicated to her.
- On May 13, 2016, by decision of the Alushta City Council, Elvira Nasonova was named an Honorary Citizen of Alushta "for significant personal contribution to the socio-cultural development of the city of Alushta, the organization and development of the rescue service in the city, significant contributions to the development of sports, and the upbringing of the younger generation in the spirit of patriotism, love for their homeland, sports, and a healthy lifestyle."

== Family ==
Her husband, Anatoly Pavlovich Balinsky (1934–1984), was a renowned Soviet mountaineer, a student of Borivoj Marechek, Abram Kikoin, and Mikhail Khergiani, and a first-category mountaineering instructor-methodologist. He earned the title of "Snow Leopard" in 1972. Anatoly and Elvira Nasonova met in 1963 in Kyrgyzstan during preparations for an expedition. He led a team of mountaineers in high-altitude work during the construction of the At-Bashi and Toktogul Hydroelectric Power Stations. From 1972 to 1978, he worked as the head of the Rescue and Control Station (RCS) in the Zaalaysky mountain district. Their son, Yegor (born 1972), died on December 30, 1990, in a car accident on a mountain road.
