= Zuzana Hofmannová =

Czech mountaineer

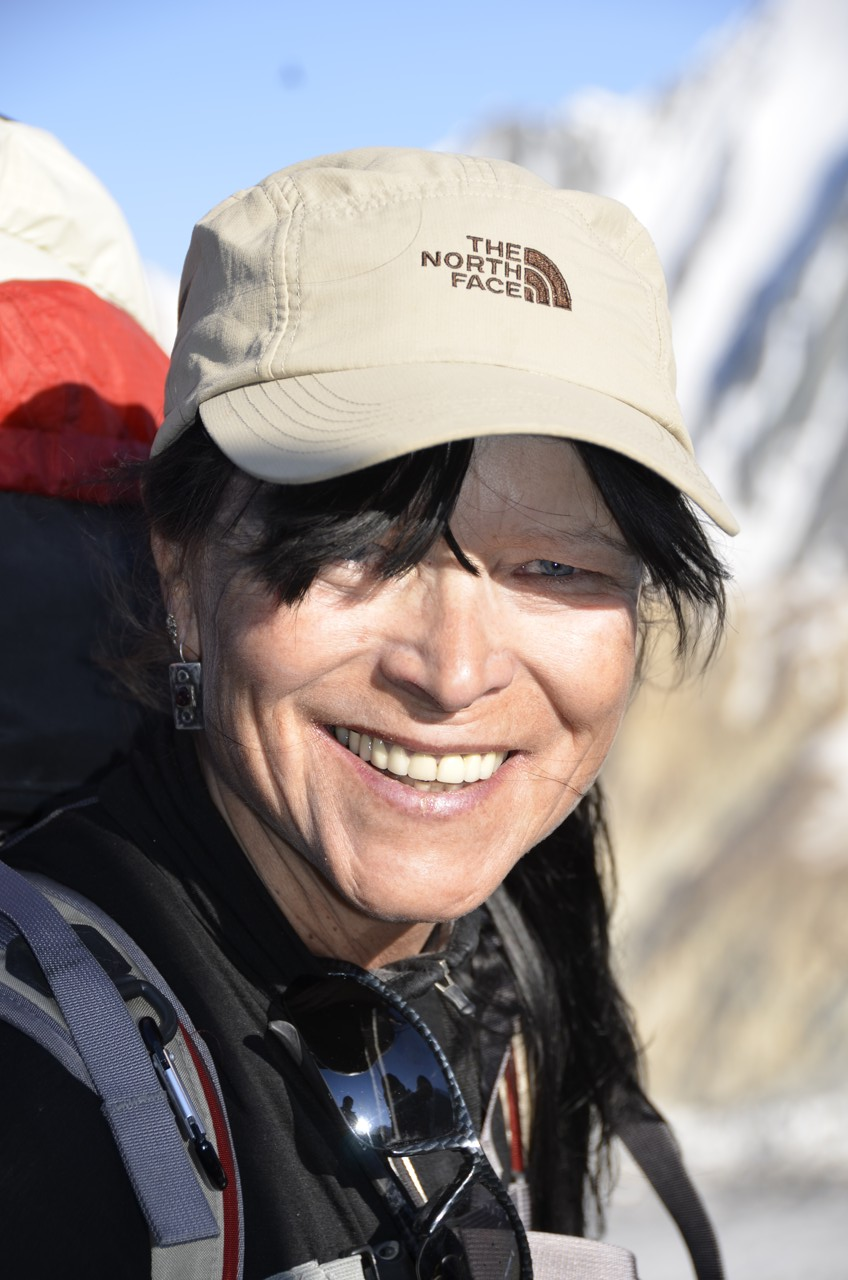

Personal information
- Native name: Zuzana Hofmannová
- Born: 15 June 1959 Czechoslovakia
- Died: 31 July 2012 (aged 53) Broad Peak

Climbing career
- Type of climber: Alpine climbing; Traditional climbing
- First ascents: First winter ascent of Piz Badile
- Known for: First Czech to summit Manaslu

Zuzana Hofmannová, née Charvátová (15 June 1959 – 31 July 2012, Broad Peak, Pakistan) was a Czech mountaineer, alpinist, and rock climber. She summited four eight-thousanders: Shishapangma, Cho Oyu, Manaslu, and Broad Peak, becoming the first Czech woman on top of three of them, Shishapangma, Manaslu and Broad Peak.

== Climbing career ==
Hofmannová first encountered mountain climbing from a television documentary about Nanga Parbat when she was 15. She would go on to become one of the top Czech mountaineers of her generation and ranked among the top European alpine climbers in the 1980s.

=== Early climbs ===
Hofmannová first started rock climbing in Labské Údolí, in the Elbe Valley, against her parents' permission. In 1979, she joined the Czech climbing association where she was coached by Václav Širl. She soon gained attention for her climbing. In 1982 she made the first female free ascent and also the first winter ascent of Piz Badile alongside Alenou Stehlíkovou, via the Direttissima Isherwood-Kosterlitz route.

In 1985, she summited Huascarán (6655 m) in Peru's Cordillera Blanca as part of an all-female expedition team. By 1988 she had made over 100 ascents across different routes in the High Tatras.

=== Himalayas ===
In 1984 she made her first Himalayan climb with an ascent attempt at Dhaulagiri, reaching 7,900m. In 1985, she was part of the first ascent by an all female team on the north face of Huascarán in the Peruvian Andes, alongside Blanka Nedvědická, Ewa Szoresniak, Ewa Pankiewicz, and Amalia Kaploniak. She returned to Huascarán in 1998, becoming the first woman to summit via the North Face twice.

In 2003 she appeared as herself in Ceské himalájské dobrodruzstvía, a Czech documentary series on the Himalayas. Over the next years she focused on climbing in the Himalayas, and would become the first Czech woman atop Shishapangma (2004) and the first Czech person to summit Manaslu (2006).

A 2005 summit attempt on Nanga Parbat was aborted due to an avalanche.

In 2009, she successfully summited her third eight-thousander, Cho Oyo.

=== Final expedition ===
On 31 July 2012, at age 53, Hofmannová became the first Czech woman to summit Broad Peak. It would be her fourth summit over 8,000m. She summited solo, and died on the descent, possibly due to an avalanche. Her climbing partners Antonín Bělík and Vít Auermüller were not with her after they diverted to save the life of a Taiwanese climber on their way to the summit.

In 2013, she was named an Honorary Member of the Czech National Academy of Sciences.

== Notable climbs ==
- 1980 – First winter ascent of Monte Civetta, via the Messner Route
- 1982 – First female ascent and first winter ascent of the Isherwood-Kosterlitz Direttissima route, on Piz Badile
- 1984 – Czechoslovak expedition to Dhaulágirí (8 167 m)
- 1985 – All female expedition, summit via North Face of Huascarán
- 1988 – Expedition to Annapurna
- 1998 – North face of Huascarán, becoming the first female climber to summit this route twice
- 2000 – Pamir, Pik Lenina (7 134 m)
- 2002 – Ťan-šan (7 439 m), Chan Tengri (6 995 m)
- 2003 – Pamir, Peak Ozodi (7 105 m), Qullai Ismoili Somoni (7 495 m)
- 2004 – Shishapangma(8 027 m)
- 2006 – Manaslu (8 163 m) via the North East Japanese route, the first ascent by a Czech woman
- 2007 – Expedition to Gasherbrum I
- 2009 – Classic route, Cho Oyo (8 201 m)
- 2011 – Spantik (7 027 m)
- 2012 – Broad Peak (8 051 m)

== See also ==
- Deaths on Broad Peak
