= Valery Khrichtchatyi =

20th-century Kazakh mountaineer

- Born: Valery Nikolaevich Khrichtchatyi; 23 December 1951; Almaty, Kazakhstan, USSR
- Died: 4 August 1993 (aged 41); Khan Tengri, Kazakhstan
- Cause of death: Avalanche
- Citizenship: Kazakhstan

Signature
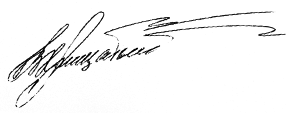

Valery Nikolaevich Khrichtchatyi (Russian: Валерий Никола́евич Хрищатый; December 23, 1951 – August 4, 1993) was a Kazakh mountaineer. He made more than forty ascents above 7,000 meters (23,000 feet), including a string of hard winter firsts in the Pamirs and Tien Shan. He climbed Everest by a new south pillar route, Kanchenjunga without oxygen and with only one bivouac, and a new route on the west side of Dhaulagiri (8,172 meters).

== Mountaineering ==
- 1974
  - February 23, Lenin Peak. First winter attempt for the Lenin Peak on February 23, 1974. This climb was Valery's introduction to high altitude with his team climbing a bit higher than 6,000 m., although short of the highest point of the mountain at 7,134 m.
- 1979
  - Rossiya Peak (6,875 m), South-eastern face, new route. High altitude (6,875 m) technical route has been climbed by SKA SAVO (led by E. Ilyinski).
- 1980
  - August 10, Communism Peak, South face direct. After two unsuccessful attempts (1976, 1977), a team of nine climbers reached the top of the Communism Peak. They spent 13 days on the wall and were the first team to reach the top through the center of the south wall. The elevation from base camp to the summit is 2,800 meters, and the central part of the mountain is a 900-meter vertical drop. The team was awarded the gold medal.
- 1982
  - May 8 Everest (8,848 m), first Soviet expedition, southwest face to the left of the Central Gully. Khrichtchatyi and Kazbek Valiev reached the summit at 1:50 a.m. (local time) on May 8, 1982.
- 1984
  - Pobeda Peak (7,439 m), North face. New route.
- 1986
  - Communism Peak (7,495 m). First winter ascent
- 1987
  - First speed scent of Lenin Peak (7,123m). The team of five (Valeriy Khrichtchatyi, Grigoriy Lunyakov, Zinur Khalitov, Anatolii Boukreev, Vladimir Suviga, Yuri Moiseev and Andrey Tselishev) reached the summit in one push from ABC at 4400m and back in 12 hours.
  - Communism Peak (7,495 m). The new route on Southeast buttress (Grigoriy Lunyakov was a team leader).
- 1988
  - January 31 Lenin Peak (7,134 m) First winter ascent. Six of the 19 climbers reached the summit.
  - Pobeda Peak (7,439 m), first traverse of peak Pobeda’s three summits: West Summit (6,918 m), Main Summit (7,439 m), and East Summit (7,060 m) and the peak of the Military Topography (6,873 m). It was a prerequisite for the Kangchenjunga expedition 1989.
- 1989
  - Kangchenjunga - three climbs without supplemental oxygen within 15 days.
    - April 15 New route, Central Peak (8,478 m) - In one daylight team climbed from camp 3 (7,200 m) to the summit delivering loads (oxygen bottles and gear) to camp 4 (7,800 m) and camp 5 (8,300 m).
    - April 30 West Peak (Yalung Kang) (8,505 m)
    - May 1 Main Peak (8,586 m) - 3 hours 25 minutes from camp 5 to the summit.
- 1990
  - February 2 Pobeda Peak (7,439 m), first winter ascent
  - August 20 Traverse peak Pobeda (7,439 m) to peak Khan-Tengri (7,010 m). Traverse included: 15 summits, 73,6 km with average altitude 6,400 m, duration 15 days (138.20 hours).
- 1991
  - May 10 Dhaulagiri peak (8,167 m) – new route on the west wall with first Kazakhstan Himalaya Expedition led by Yuriy Moiseev and Kazbek Valiev. Ascent without use of supplemental oxygen.
  - First Snow Leopard award in one season including Malik Ismetov, Sergey Gritsuk and Vladimir Suviga. Valery Khrichtchatyi climbed 4 out of 5 required mountains (peak Lenina is missing). Peak Pobeda was climbed in a day and Khan Tengri was climbed in 17 hours, including full decent to the glacier.
  - October 7 Manaslu peak (8,153 m)(attempt), which ended tragically with the loss of three lives of Z.Khalitov, G.Lunyakov, M.Galiev
- 1992
  - Khan Tengri (7,010 m). First winter climb. Entire expedition took 10 days from Almaty and back.
  - Everest (8,848 m) Kazakh-Japanese expedition to Everest, new route through the Eastern Ridge. Expedition failed due to rescue of Japanese climbers.

== Death ==
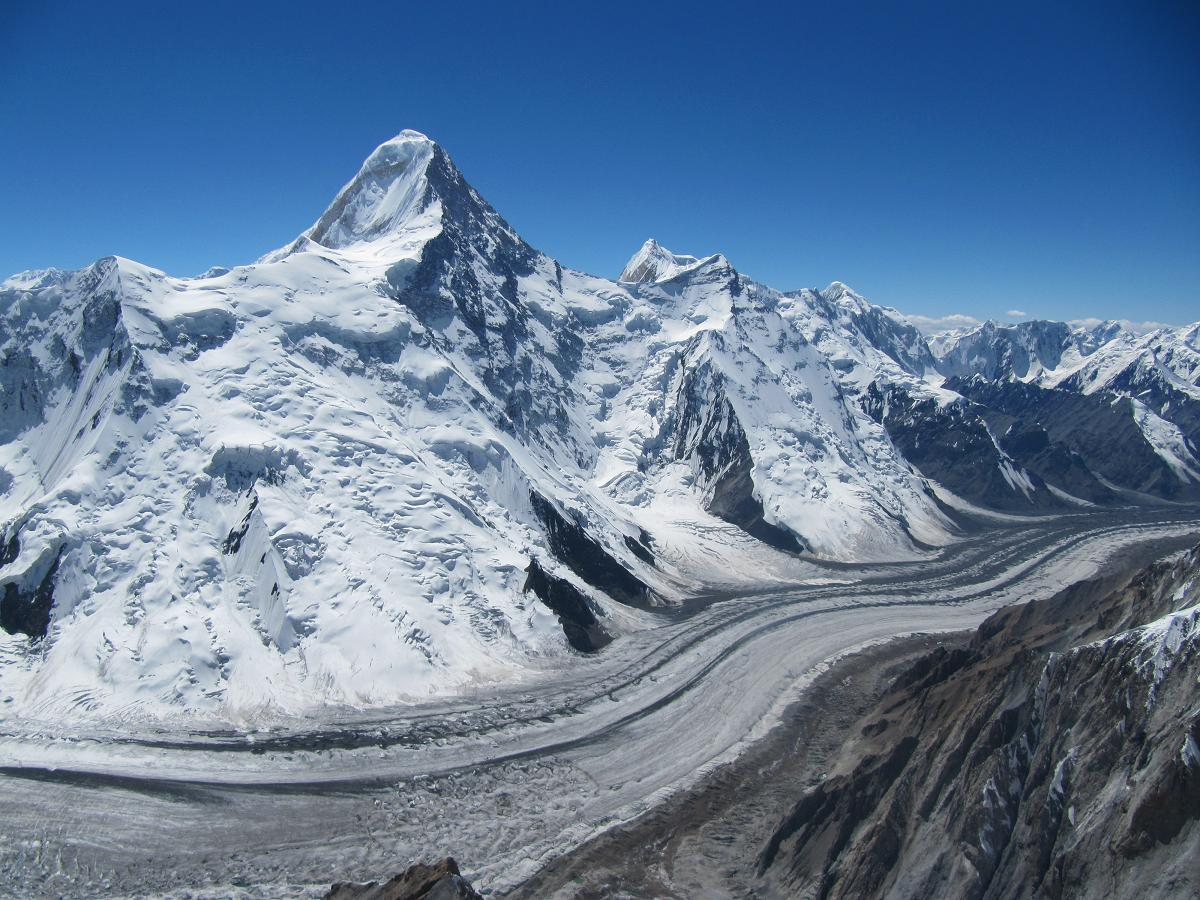
North wall of Khan Tengri

Valery Khrichtchatyi was killed in a massive ice fall/avalanche that struck off Chapaev Peak on Semenovskii glacier on August 4, 1993 while attempting to summit Khan-Tengri (7,010 m). Khrichtchatyi’s long-time friend Ilia Iodes and two British climbers also met their deaths. The body of one Englishman was recovered, but the others including Khrichtchatyi were never found. That same summer Khrichtchatyi was planning a solo speed climb of the north wall of Khan Tengri.

== Writing ==
Valery published two books (1988,1995) which summarized his copious notes collected throughout his climbing carrier.

== Commemoration ==
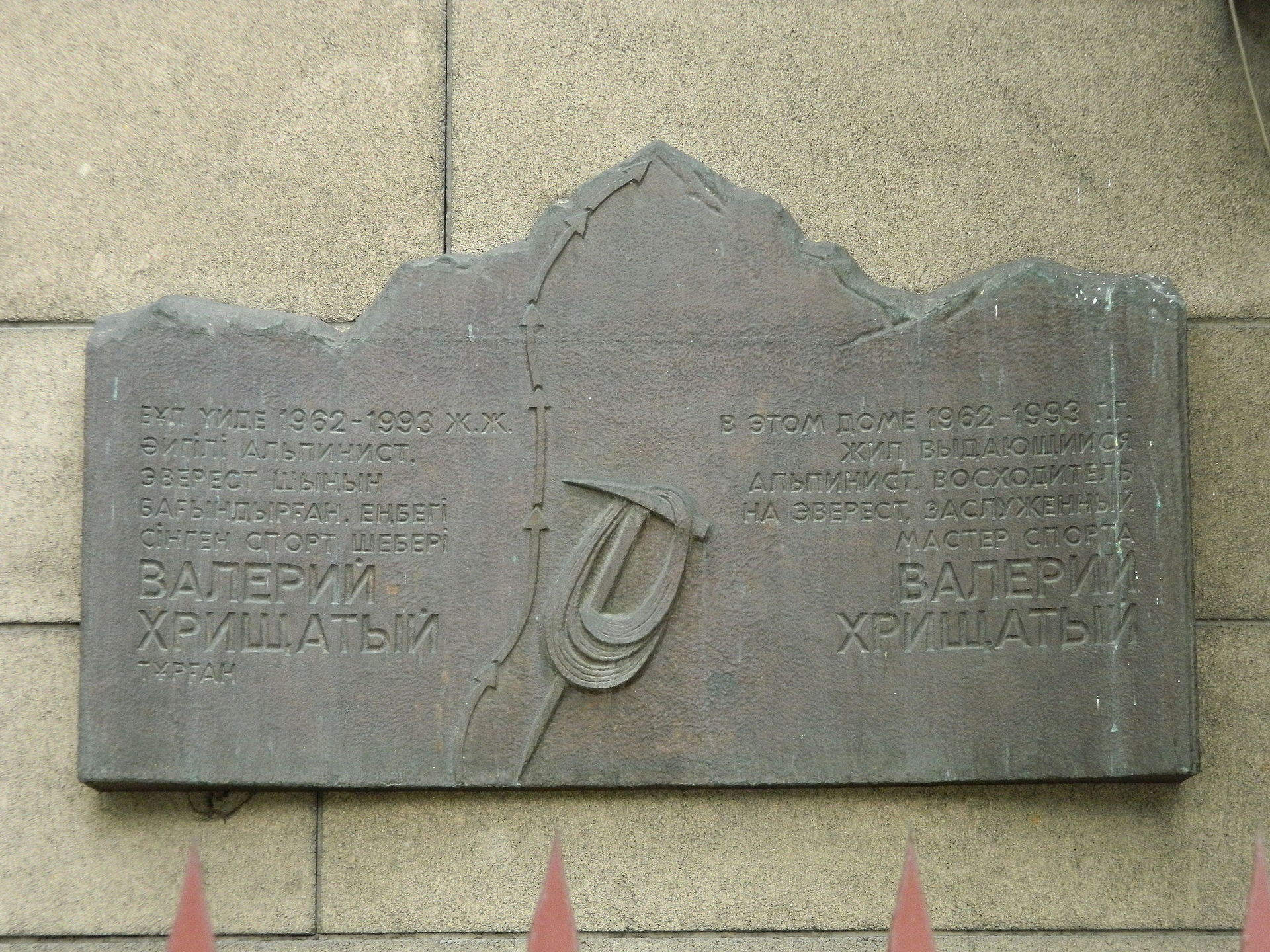
15 Kurmangazy, Almaty, Kazakhstan

- In 2003 Khrichtchatyi’s name was given to the mountain pass after Anatoliy Dzhuliy and his team of set a new route to the pass that connects Druzhba glacier located on the upper side of Yuzhniy Inylchak and Tugbelchi glacier (China).
- In 2017, the Almaty Mountaineering Federation decided to rename Yoshkar-Ola Peak into Valery Khrichtchatyi Peak.

== Publications ==
=== Books ===
- Icebergs above the clouds (Russian: Айсберги над облаками), published in Almaty, Kazakhstan 1989
- We dissolve into the elements (Russian: Мы растворяемся в стихии), published in Prague, Czech Republic 1998

=== Articles ===
- Cold breath of the mountain, Great Climbs by Chris Bonington 1994, p. 206 ISBN 1-85732-573-7
- Pik Pobedy in Winter, American Alpine Journal, Volume 33, Issue 65, 1991, p. 69
- Everest's Northeast Ridge, American Alpine Journal by Motomo Ohmiya and Valery Khrichtchatyi 1993, pp15–18.
