= José Antonio Delgado =

Venezuelan mountain climber (1965–2006)

- Born: 13 May 1965; Caracas, Venezuela
- Died: 22 July 2006 (aged 41); Nanga Parbat
- Education: Universidad Simón Bolívar
- Occupation: mountaineer
- Spouse: Frida Ayala
- Children: 2

José Antonio Delgado Sucre (13 May 1965 – 22 July 2006) was the first Venezuelan mountaineer to reach the summit of five eight-thousanders and one of the most experienced climbers in Latin America. Known as el indio ("The Indian", for his strength), Delgado led the first Venezuelan Everest expedition in 2001. On May 23 of that year, he and Marcus Tobía were the only members of the expedition to summit Everest. He held several records in mountaineering, such as the first paragliding flight from Pico Humboldt, Pico Bolívar, and Roraima. Delgado also made the fastest summit for a Venezuelan to the Aconcagua (from the Puente del Inca in 34 hours) and Huascarán (from the base in 14 hours).

== Biography ==
Jose Antonio Delgado Sucre was born in Caracas, Venezuela. He studied mechanical engineering at the Universidad Simón Bolívar and married Frida Ayala with whom he had two children.

== Death and legacy ==
Delgado was the leader of the Venezuelan Nanga Parbat expedition. He and fellow climber Edgar Guariguata flew out to Pakistan in June 2006. Due to illness Guariguata remained at base camp while Delgado went on. After he reached the summit of Nanga Parbat on July 11, a snow storm surprised him on his descent. Delgado managed to reach camp four. After being without food or water for two days he attempted to make it to camp three. No further communications were received by base camp, so the Pakistani authorities were alerted. A group of six Pakistani mountaineers, consisting of Qurban Muhammad (Shimshal), Ghulam Rasool, Muhammad, Muhammad Ibrahim, Ghulam Muhammad, and Muhammad Ali, climbed the mountain despite the rough weather. On July 22, they found Delgado's body at an altitude of 7100m between camp three and four in the open near his tent.

During the expedition to Nanga Parbat, he was the subject of a pilot for a television series about mountaineering. Explorart Films, the production company, later developed the project into a feature documentary film, released in South America in January 2008. The film follows Jose Antonio's climbing career and includes footage of several of his expeditions including the Nanga Parbat climb and the rescue attempts that followed the accident. Jose Antonio and his wife Frida were co-producers of the film.

== Awards ==
He was awarded the Orden al Mérito Deportivo and the Orden Vicente Emilio Sojo in 2001 by the Venezuelan government. He was a founding member of the Proyecto Cumbre (1997) and the head of the Centro Excursionista Loyola from 1982 to 1983.

== Eight-thousanders ==
- Cho Oyu, 8153 m, Nepal-China, 1994 (first Venezuelan)
- Shishapangma 8008 m, China, 1998 (first Venezuelan)
- Gasherbrum II, 8035 m, Pakistan-China, 2000 (first Venezuelan)
- Everest, 8848 m, Nepal-China, 2001
- Nanga Parbat, 8125 m, Pakistan, 2006 (first Venezuelan)

== Mountain summits ==
- Pico Humboldt, 4942 m, Venezuela, 1982
- Pico Bolívar, 5007 m, Venezuela, 1983
- Chopicalqui, 6320 m, Peru, 1985
- Artesonraju, 6010 m, Peru, 1985
- Ritacuba Blanco, 5300 m, Colombia, 1986
- Artesonraju, 6010 m, Peru, 1986
- Ranrapalca, 6162 m, Peru, 1986
- Huascarán Sur, 6768 m, Peru, 1986
- Ritacuba Negro, 5200 m, Colombia, 1987
- Huayna Potosí Sur, 6050 m, Bolivia, 1987
- Illimani Central, 6438 m, Bolivia, 1987
- The Maroon Bells, United States, 1990
  - Maroon Peak 4316 m
  - North Maroon Peak 4272 m
- Long Peak, 4345 m, United States, 1990
- Pikes Peak, 4302 m, United States, 1990
- Popocatepetl, 5452 m, Mexico, 1991
- Iztaccíhuatl, 5286 m, Mexico, 1991
- Pico de Orizaba a.k.a. Citlaltépetl, 5636 m, Mexico, 1991
- Marmolejo, 6100 m, Chile-Argentina, 1991
- Volcán San Pedro, 5800 m, Chile-Argentina, 1991
- Aconcagua, 7021 m, Argentina, 1991
- Cotopaxi, 6005 m, Ecuador, 1991
- Chimborazo, 6310 m, Ecuador, 1991
- Cóncavo, 5200 m, Colombia, 1992
- Pan de Azúcar, 5180 m, Colombia, 1992
- Illampu, 6362 m, Bolivia, 1992
- Ama Dablam, 6812 m, Nepal, 1993
- Adam's Peak, 2233 m, Sri Lanka, 1994
- Stock Kangri, 6100, India, 1994
- Pisco, 5300 m, Peru, 1996
- Huascarán Norte, 6654 m, Peru, 1996
- Cayambe, 5840 m, Ecuador, 1997
- Denali-McKinley, 6229 m, Alaska-USA, 1998
- Muztagh Ata, 7546 m, China, 1999
- Breithorn, 4165 m, Switzerland-Italy, 1999
- Ojos del Salado, 6908 m, Chile-Argentina, 2001
- Aconcagua, 6961 m, Argentina, 2001
- Everest, 8848 m, Nepal, 2001
- Monte Bianco, 4810 m, Italy-France, 2001
- Tsacra Chico Norte, 5513 m, Peru, 2002
- Chapaev North (near Chapaev Peak), 6100 m, Kazakhstan, 2004
- Khan Tengri, 7010 m, Kazakhstan, 2005
- Nanga Parbat 8125 m, Pakistan, 2006
