= Elvira Shatayeva =

Soviet mountaineer (1938–1974)

Elvira Shatayeva (1 December 1938 - 8 August 1974) was a Soviet mountaineer and professional athlete. In 1974, she led an all-female expedition to Lenin Peak. During the descent, she and the seven other members of her expedition were caught in a snowstorm and died.

== Early life ==
Shatayeva was born in Moscow. A former art student, she was introduced to climbing and mountaineering by her husband, Vladimir Shatayev.

== Climbing career ==
Shatayeva achieved the rare distinction Master of Sport, one of the top levels of the Unified Sports Classification System of the then-Soviet Union.

Shatayeva was the third woman to ascend 24,590‐foot Ismoil Somani Peak, the highest in the Soviet Union. In 1972, she was the first Soviet woman to lead an all-female ascent of a peak above 7,000 meters. This ascent took place on Ozodi Peak, located in Tajikistan. In 1973, she led a five-woman expedition on the north–south traverse of Mount Ushba in the Caucasus.

== Final climb and death ==
Shatayeva organized the Lenin Peak ascent in the summer of 1973. She chose seven other women for the team, with mountain experience ranging from five to eighteen years. Two had climbed Lenin Peak previously. The women were:

- Elvira Shatayeva of Moscow
- Nina Vasilyeva of Moscow
- Valentina Fateyeva of Moscow
- Ilsinar Mukhamedova of Dushanbe
- Tatyana Sardashove of Dushanbe
- Galina Perekhodyuk of Chelyabinsk
- Lyudmila Manzharova of Frunze
- Irina Lyubimtseva of Sverdlovsk

The women began their ascent in July 1974, pitching their tents in a high valley of the Pamir Mountains, across a mountain stream from an international Alpine camp for Western climbers. The women planned to cross Lenin Peak from northeast to west. They made two training climbs to acclimate to the altitude, after which they wrote critiques of one another. Though there were initially nine hikers, one was dropped from the team when the others decided she was not prepared to make the final ascent.

On 8 August, American and Japanese climbers discovered the bodies of Shatayeva and her seven companions. Shatayeva's husband returned to the mountain with companions Serge Siroko and Valery Davidenko on 11 August, discovering the bodies two days later. The three men buried the bodies in temporary snow graves at 23,000 feet, a task which took five hours. Shatayev surmised that two of the hikers had fallen ill in a snowstorm and that the others had been unwilling to leave them. He concluded that his wife had been the last to die, as she was found at the lowest altitude.

All told, the event killed thirteen people: three Estonian hikers, Jon Gary Ullin, Eva Isenschmid, and the eight Russian women.

=== Aftermath and inquiry ===
American climber Jed Williamson said, "They weren't weak or stupid. I place no blame on them. Those conditions converged. It was the perfect storm. I have nothing but admiration. I'm just sad those conditions came together. The storm came in pretty fast and went fast. Two days later it was bluebird skies, and we were in shirtsleeves."

Shatayeva's husband has speculated that his wife's decision to take a rest day on 3 August was calculated to get distance from a group of male Soviet climbers, who had positioned themselves near in case the women needed rescue. "The possibility cannot be ruled out that it was precisely for this reason that the women were dragging out the climb, trying to break loose from the guardianship," Shatayev wrote.

A government inquiry found later found that the eight deaths had resulted "not from mismanagement or mistakes, but from a natural disaster."

== In popular culture ==
- "Phantasia for Elvira Shatayev" by Adrienne Rich (poem, 1974)
- "Phantasia for Elvira Shatayev" for soprano and orchestra, by Thomas Oboe Lee (1981)
- "Climbing the Mountain" by Susan Fromberg Schaeffer (poem, 1975)
