= Alexander Nevsky Cathedral, Yalta =

Crimean orthodox cathedral

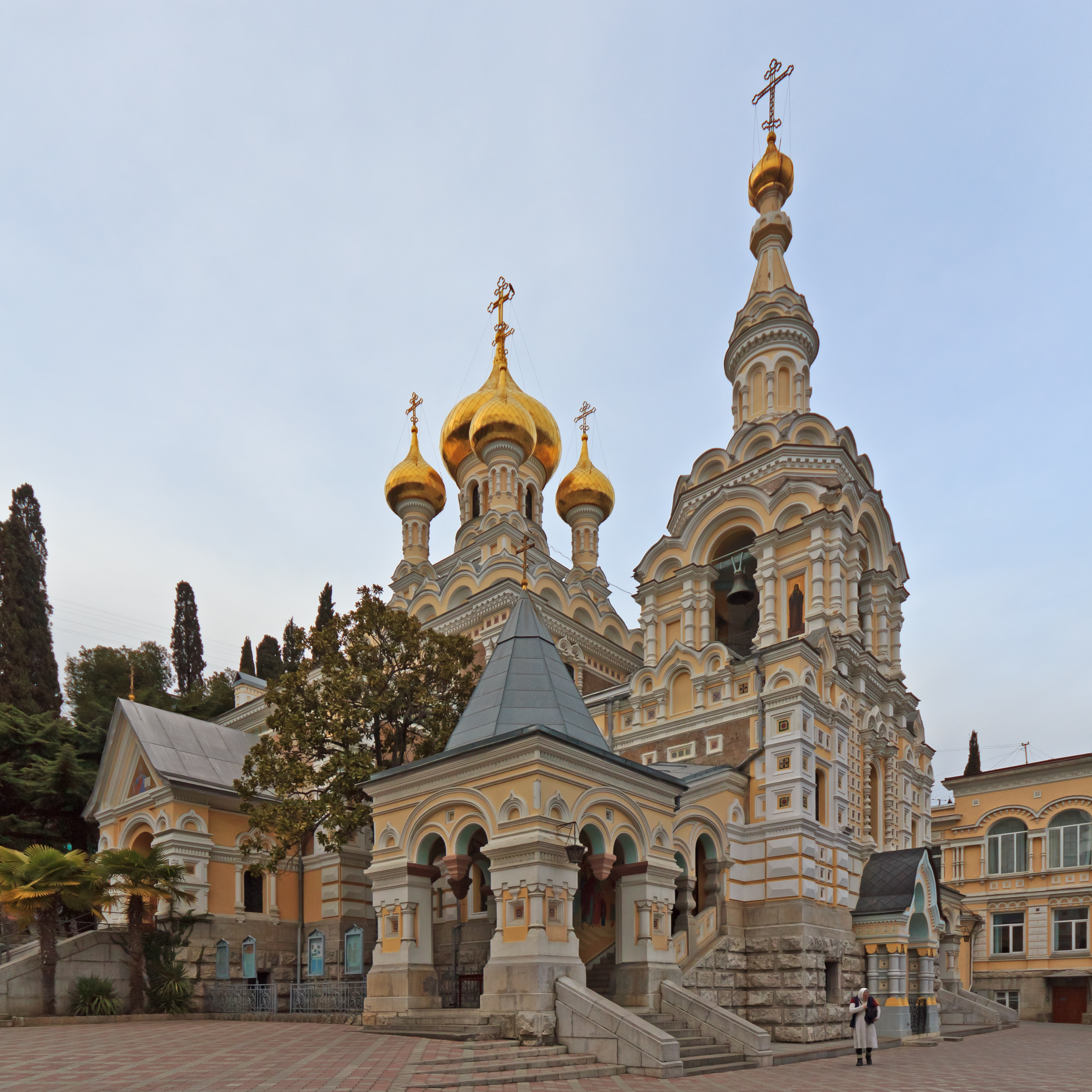
- Alexander Nevsky Cathedral, Yalta
- 44°29′43″N 34°09′50″E
- Location: Yalta, Crimea
- Country: Ukraine
- Denomination: Eastern Orthodoxy

History
- Founded: 1 March 1891 (laying of the first stone)
- Consecrated: 4 December 1902

Architecture
- Years built: 1891–1902

The Alexander Nevsky Cathedral, named after St. Alexander Nevsky, is an Eastern Orthodoxy cathedral in Yalta, Crimea, built in 1902, and designed by Nikolay Krasnov.

== History ==
The cathedral was built in honour of the Emperor Alexander II of Russia, who was assassinated by the political revolutionaries group Narodnaya Volya.

The construction committee, established 1 March 1890, was headed by the renowned Yalta engineer and historian Alexandre Berthier-Delagarde. Large sums were donated by notable citizens B. V. Khvoschinsky and I. F. Tokmakov, and the land plot was gifted by Baron A. L. Wrangel. The architects were Nikolay Krasnov and P.K. Terebenev, whose design was approved by Emperor Alexander III.

The laying of the first stone took place on 1 March 1891, the tenth anniversary of Alexander II's death, with Maria Alexandrovna, his first wife and mother of Alexander III, in attendance. The consecration of the cathedral occurred 4 December 1902 in the presence of Emperor Nicholas II, his family, and entourage.

The cathedral, two-storeys tall and with open galleries, was built in a Russian style. Next to the cathedral, a three-tiered bell tower was erected, with 11 bells cast in Moscow. Icons for the cathedral were painted by masters from Mstyora in the Vladimir Governorate.

The interior was designed by architect S. P. Kroshchekin, the iconostasis, dome, and walls were painted by the Kyiv artist I. Murashko. The mosaic depicting the holy prince on the exterior of the temple was executed by students of the Venetian A. Salviati. The temple domes were covered in gold.

Adjacent to the cathedral, in the style of the Russian terem, was a three-story building completed in 1908, which housed the church school in honour of Tsarevich Alexei, a shelter for tuberculosis patients, a hall for the meetings of the Alexander Nevsky Brotherhood. The Brotherhood engaged in charitable activities, the organization of parish schools, and missionary work, and during World War I, also assisted the wounded and arranged hospitals and sanatoriums.

The first rector of the cathedral was A.Y. Ternivsky, who had previously served at the Yalta Church of St. John Chrysostom.

In 1938, the temple was closed, and the bells were sent for melting. A sports club was established in the cathedral, and the school building became the House of Teachers.

Worship in the cathedral resumed in 1942, after the establishment of Nazi administration in Crimea. After the liberation of Crimea, the temple was registered as functioning in practice.

In the 1990s, a team of industrial climbers, led by the renowned Soviet mountaineer and mountain rescuer Elvira Nasonova, a resident of Alushta, carried out uniquely complex high-altitude work on the domes of the Cathedral. She also completed several other restoration projects for the Crimean Diocese.

== Present ==
Since 1995, a comprehensive parish school has been operating.

== See also ==
- Church of the Resurrection, Foros
