= Tunç Fındık =

Turkish mountaineer and author

Tunç Fındık (born 1972, Ankara) is a Turkish professional climber, mountaineer, mountain guide, author, and motivational speaker.

== Life ==
He is the first Turkish climber who climbed Mount Everest twice and from different routes. He summited many mountains in Turkey and abroad including eight-thousanders.

In 2023. He became the 49th person to climb all 14 of the eight-thousanders.

- Mount Everest (8848 m) in 2001, Second climb north ridge route in 2007
- Cho Oyu (8201 m) in 2005
- Lhotse (8516 m) in 2006
- Dhaulagiri (8167 m) in 2009
- Makalu (8462 m) in 2010
- Kangchenjunga (8586 m) in 2011
- K2 (8611 m) in 2012
- Shishapangma (8027 m) in 2013
- Manaslu (8163 m) in 2013
- Gasherbrum II (8035 m) in 2014
- Broad Peak (8047 m) in 2017
- Annapurna (8091 m) in 2019
- Gasherbrum I (8068 m) in 2019
- Nanga Parbat (8126 m) in 2023

Fındık was climbing on Nanga Parbat at the time that terrorists executed 11 people at the base camp in the 2013 Nanga Parbat massacre. His life was saved because he was at Camp 2 on the mountain when the attack took place.

== Books ==
- Kaçkar-Verçenik Tırmanış Rehberi 'Alter Yayınları'
- Tanrıların Tahtına Yolculuk- Everest Tırmanışımın Hikâyesi 'Alter Yayınları'
- Karakurum'da 80 gün 'Geven Yayınları'
- Aladağlar'da 50 Rota 'Geven Yayınları'
- Kış Dağcılığı / Teknikler ve Taktikler 'AKUT Yayınları'
- 50 Climbing routes in the Aladag 'Geven Yayınları'
- Aladaglar haritası 1:25.000 ölçekli 'Geven Yayınları'
- İrtifa 8000- Yüksek Macera 'Tunç Fındık Yayınları'
- K2 Dağların Dağı 'Tunç Fındık Yayınları'
- Altitude 8000 'Tunç Fındık Yayınları'

== Documentary ==
- K2 Mountain of Mountains (2014)

== See also ==
- List of Mount Everest summiters by number of times to the summit
- Nasuh Mahruki
