= Kakshaal Too =

Mountain range in Kyrgyzstan and China

- Кокшаал Тоо
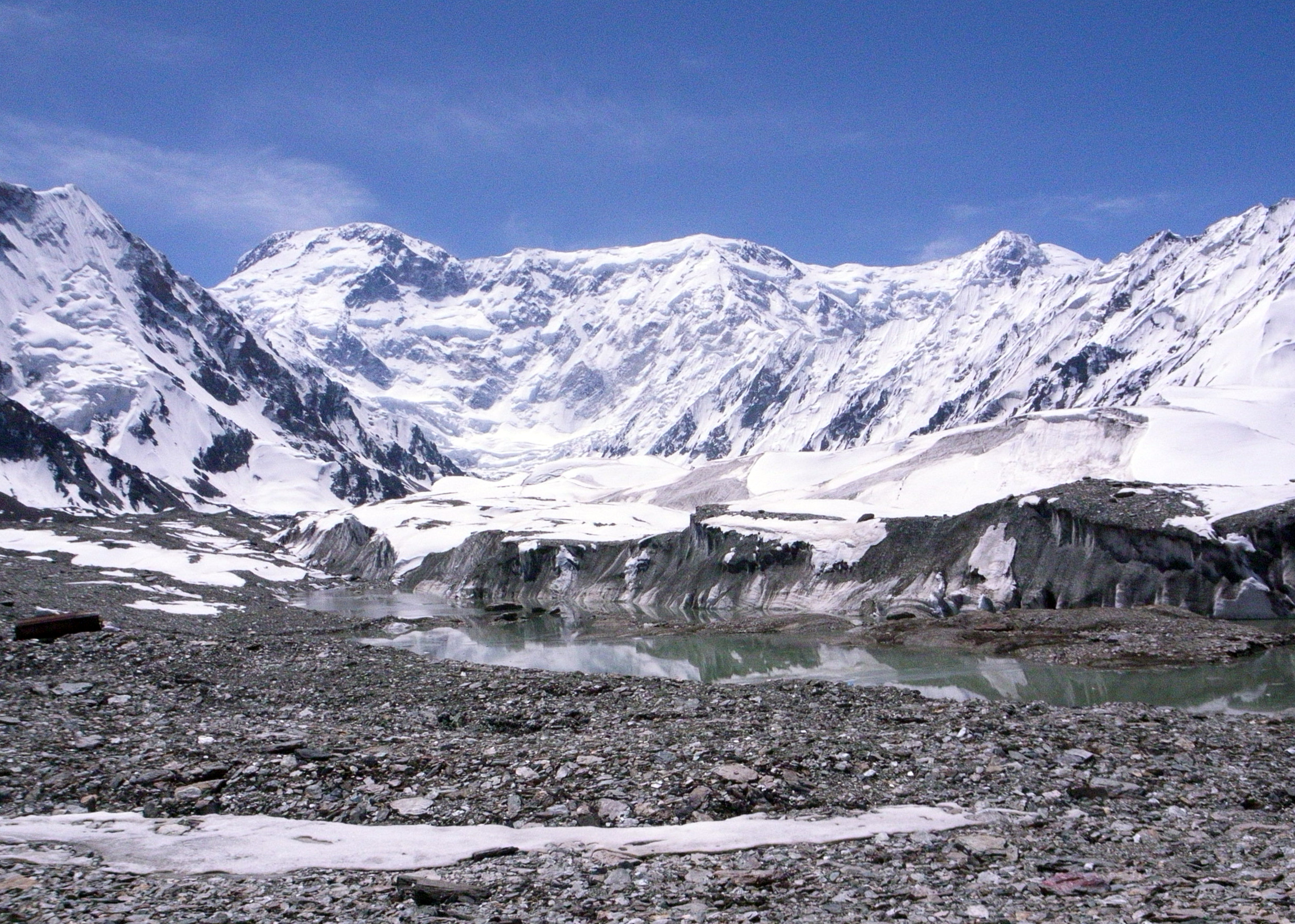
- Jengish Chokusu

Highest point
- Peak: Jengish Chokusu
- Elevation: 7,439 m (24,406 ft)
- Coordinates: 41°40′12″N 79°00′00″E

Dimensions
- Length: 582 km (362 mi) E–W
- Width: 54 km (34 mi) N–S

Naming
- Etymology: 'Wild Mountain'
- Native name: Какшаал Тоо (Kyrgyz)

Geography
- Location within Kyrgyzstan
- Countries: Kyrgyzstan and China

The Kakshaal Too (Kyrgyz: Какшаал Тоо, قاقشاال توو, IPA: [qɑqˈʃɑːɫ toː]) is a large mountain range in the Central Tian Shan. It stretches for a length of 582 kilometres (362 mi) (in Kyrgyzstan) between Kyrgyzstan and China. The width of the range is 54 kilometres (34 mi) and the highest point – Jengish Chokusu (7,439 metres (24,406 ft)).

== Topography ==
The range consists of three parts:

1. Eastern section: Known as Bozkyr, extending to the Saryjaz Gorge with branches like Kayyndy, Koykap, and Maybash.
2. Central section: Includes branches like Karaichketoo, Akzoo, Jangart, Üchchoku, and Kaichy.
3. Western section: Includes Karakyr and Torugart descending towards the Aksai Valley and settling into Cenozoic deposits.

The southern slopes are steep (50–60°), while the northern ones are gentler (30–40°). The ridges are sharp and often rugged, with many gorges and rocky cliffs. Major passes include Bedel, Kogirim, Bikirtik, Kaichy, Karabel, Akögüz, and Suuktör (4,200 m).

== Landscapes ==
The landscapes include high-altitude steppes (2800 – 3100 m), Alpine meadows (3100 – 3500 m), high-altitude tundra steppes (3400 – 3800 m), and glacial-nival belt (above 3800 m).

== Geology ==
The Kakshaal Too lies within the southern Tien Shan and formed during the Hercynian orogeny. Structurally, it consists of a mega-anticlinal formation trending northeast. It is mainly composed of limestones, siltstones, sandstones, conglomerates, and argillites of Paleozoic intruded by granites, granosyenite, and syenite.
