= Fortambek Glacier =

Glacier

Fortambek Glacier is a glacier located in the Sangvor District of Tajikistan, located near Peak Ozodi. The glacier is about 27km in length.

Location of Fortambek Glacier in Tajikistan

== Description ==
Fortambek Glacier is located in a mountainous region. It is located in a valley. The area has a population density of less than 2 people. It is almost completely covered with ice.

== Climate ==
The average temperature is -13°C. The warmest month is August, with an average temperature of -3°C and the coldest is January, with an average temperature of -24°C. The average rainfall is 575 millimeters per year. The wettest month is April, with about 91 millimeters of rain, and the driest is September, with about 14 millimeters.
