= Nikolai Korzhenevskiy =

Russian geographer, glaciologist, and explorer (1879–1958)

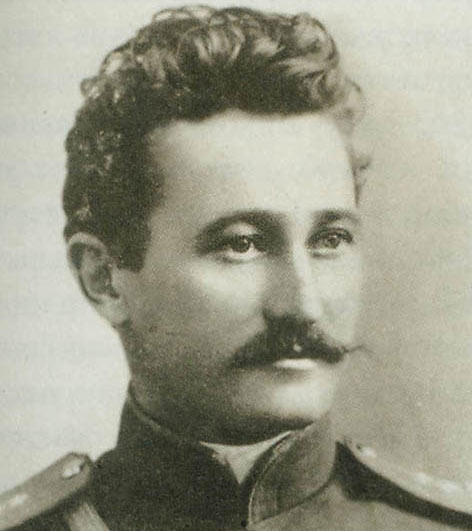

Nikolai Leopoldovich Korzhenevskiy (Russian: Николай Леопольдович Коржене́вский, February 18, 1879 – October 31, 1958), born in Zaverezhye, Vitebsk Governorate, Russian Empire (present-day Nevelsky District, Pskov Oblast, Russia), died in Tashkent, Uzbekistan. Korzhenevskiy was a Russian and Soviet geographer, glaciologist, and explorer of the Pamir Mountains. His exploration of the Pamirs began in 1903, with support from the military command in the region. Between 1903 and 1928, Korzhenevskiy organized eleven expeditions to various parts of the Pamirs. In August 1910 he discovered one of the highest peaks in the Pamir Mountains, which he named Korzhenevskoi Peak after his wife Evgeniya Korzhenevskaya (Russian: Пик Корженевской). In 1928 he produced a unique map of the Pamirs which, for the first time, included a meridional mountain range that he had discovered and called the Academy of Sciences Range in honor of the Academy of Sciences of the Soviet Union.

Alternative transliterations of Korzhenevskiy's name include Korzhenevskii, Korzhenevski, Korzhenevsky, and Korzhenievsky.
