= Snow Leopard award =

Russian sports award

The Snow Leopard award (Russian: Снежный барс) was a Soviet mountaineering award, given to highly skilled mountaineers. It is still recognized in the Commonwealth of Independent States. To receive this award, a climber was required to summit all five peaks within the former Soviet Union with elevation above 7,000 m (23,000 ft).

It was founded on October 12, 1967 by the Central Council of Sports Societies and Organizations of the USSR.

== The peaks ==
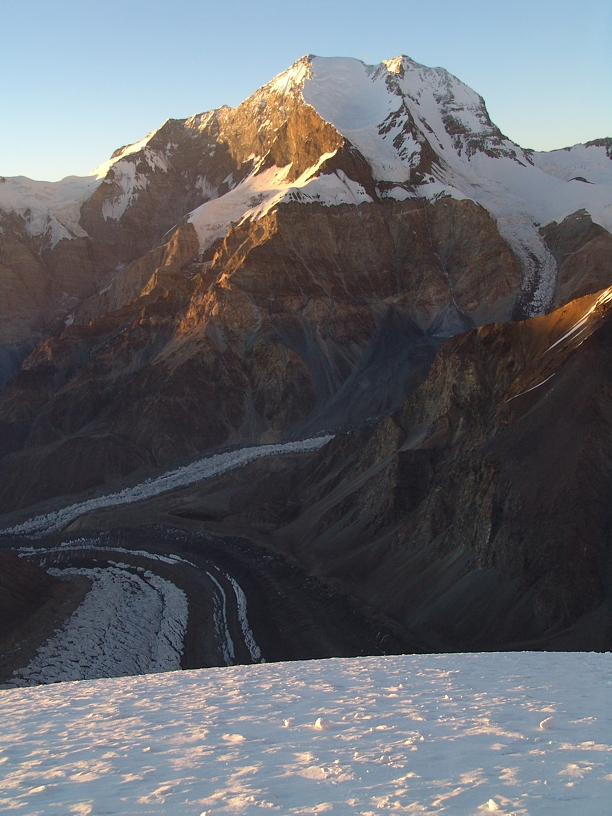
Peak Ozodi

The Snow Leopard peaks include:

1. Ismoil Somoni Peak 24,590 feet (7,500 m)
2. Jengish Chokusu 24,406 feet (7,439 m)
3. Ibn Sina Peak 23,406 feet (7,134 m)
4. Peak Ozodi 23,310 feet (7,100 m)
5. Khan Tengri 22,999 feet (7,010 m)

In Tajikistan's Pamir Mountains there are three Snow Leopard peaks, Ismoil Samani Peak (formerly Communism Peak) 7,495 metres (24,590 ft), Peak Ozodi (formerly Peak Korzhenevskaya) 7,105 metres (23,310 ft), and Ibn Sina Peak (formerly Lenin Peak) 7,134 metres (23,406 ft) on the Kyrgyzstan-Tajikistan border.

In the Tian Shan there are two Snow Leopard peaks, Jengish Chokusu (formerly Peak Pobeda) 7,439 metres (24,406 ft) in Kyrgyzstan (divided by the border with China), and Khan Tengri 7,010 metres (23,000 ft) on the Kyrgyzstan-Kazakhstan border. Khan Tengri's geologic elevation is 6,995 metres (22,949 ft) but its glacial cap rises to 7,010 metres (23,000 ft). For this reason, it is considered a 7,000 m (23,000 ft) peak.

In order of difficulty, Jengish Chokusu is by far the most difficult and dangerous, followed by Khan Tengri, Ismail Samani Peak, Peak Korzhenevskaya, and Lenin (Ibn Sina) Peak.

== Recipients ==
There are more than 600 climbers, including 31 women, who have received this award between 1961 and 2012 (although not all of them completed the five peaks).

=== Records ===
- Boris Korshunov (Russia) – nine times Snow Leopard (1981 – 2004) and last award at the age of 69
- Andrzej Bargiel (Poland) – all five ascents in 29 days 17 hours 5 minutes (time counted from leaving the Advanced Base Camp under Lenin Peak, 15 July 2016)
- Elvira Nasonova (Russia) – three time "Snow Leopard," the only woman to do so.
