= Chapaev Peak =

Mountain in Kyrgyzstan

- Pik Chapayeva
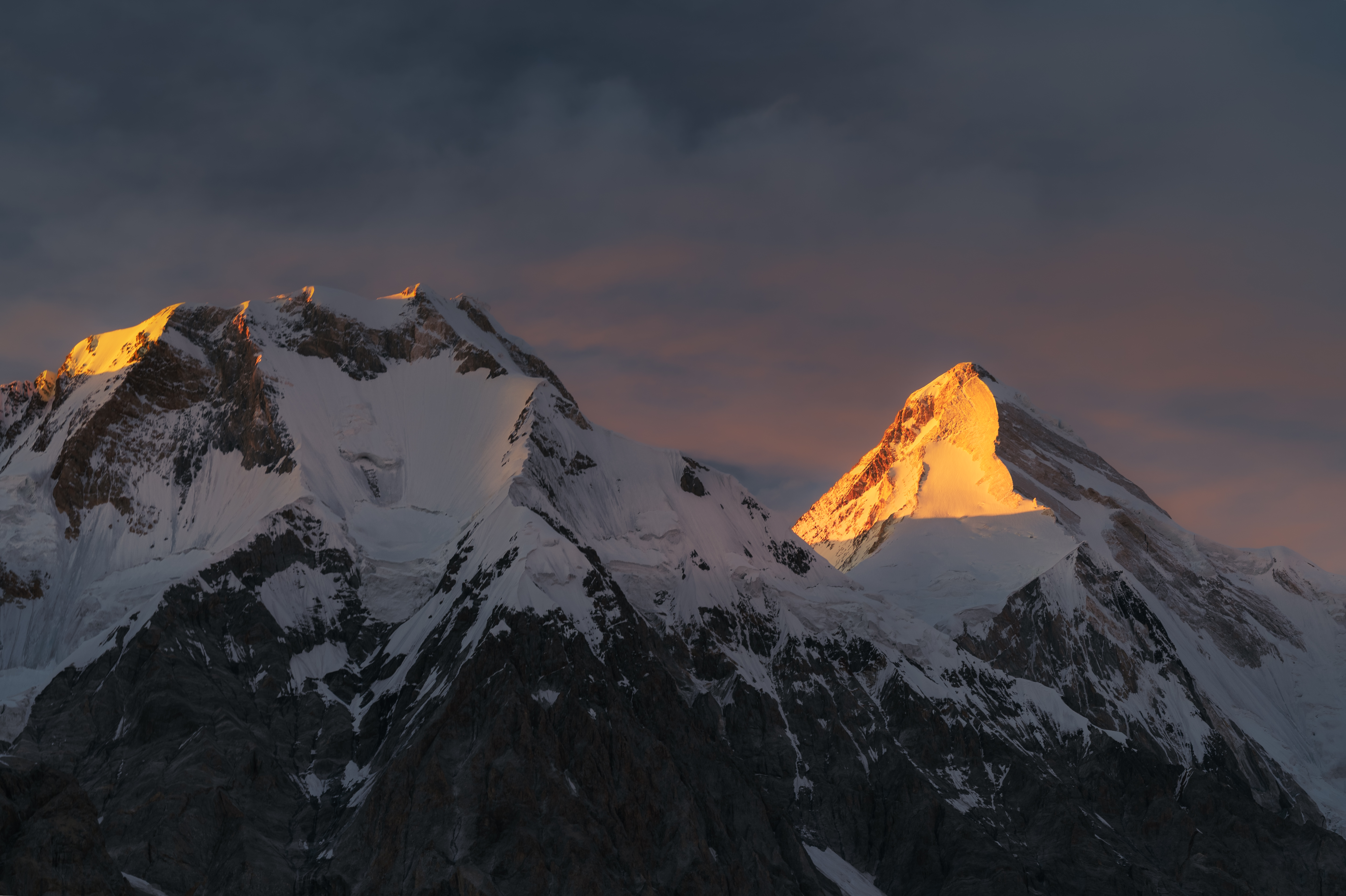
- Chapaev Peak (left) and Khan Tengri Peak (right) at sunset from South Engilchek Base Camp, Tengri-Tag ridge, Central Tian Shan, Kyrgyzstan

Highest point
- Elevation: 6,371 m (20,902 ft)
- Prominence: 1,055 m (3,461 ft)
- Coordinates: 42°11′58″N 80°8′18″E

Geography
- Location within Kyrgyzstan
- Location: Issyk-Kul Region, Kyrgyzstan
- Parent range: Tian Shan

Chapaev Peak (Russian: Пик Чапаева, romanized: Pik Chapayeva), also romanized as Chapayev Peak, is a 6,371-metre-tall (20,902 ft) mountain in the Tian Shan. It is located in the Issyk-Kul Region in east Kyrgyzstan.

It is separated from Khan Tengri by a 3.28-kilometre-long (2 mi) ridge.

== History ==
It is named for the Russian soldier and Red Army commander Vasily Chapaev and was first climbed in 1937 by I. Tjutjunnikow.
