= Peak Ozodi =

Mountain in Tajikistan

Ozodi Peak
- Korzhenevskoi Peak
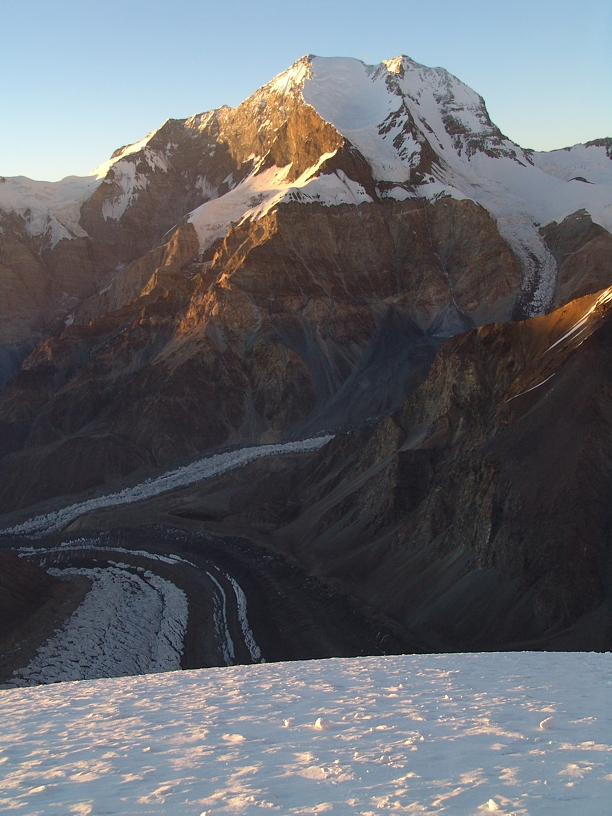

Highest point
- Elevation: 7,105 m (23,310 ft)
- Prominence: 1,650 m (5,410 ft)
- Isolation: 11.6 km (7.2 mi)
- Listing: Ultra
- Coordinates: 39°03′27″N 72°00′30″E

Geography
- Location within Tajikistan
- Location: GBAO, Tajikistan
- Parent range: Academy of Sciences Range (Pamirs)

Climbing
- First ascent: 1953 by A. Ugarov et al.
- Easiest route: rock/snow/ice climb

Ozodi Peak (Russian: Пик Озоди, Freedom Peak) or until 2020 Korzhenevskoi Peak (Russian: Пик Корженевской), is the third highest peak in the Pamir Mountains of Tajikistan. It is one of the five "Snow Leopard Peaks" in the territory of the former Soviet Union.

== Location ==
Ozodi Peak lies about 13 km (8.1 mi) north of Ismoil Somoni Peak (formerly Communism Peak), the highest point of the Pamirs. It forms the end of the northwest fork of the Academy of Sciences Range, the north–south trending subrange which forms the core of the Pamirs. It rises on the south bank of the Muksu River, and to the west of the peak is the Fortambek Glacier. While most of the Academy of Sciences Range is in Tajikistan's Gorno-Badakhshan Autonomous Province (GBAO), Ozodi Peak is located a little to the west of the GBAO line, in Jirgatol district (Region of Republican Subordination).

== Names ==
Until 2020, it was named after Evgenia Korzhenevskaya, the wife of Russian geographer Nikolai L. Korzhenevskiy, who discovered the peak in August 1910. Due to transliteration and declension issues the peak's former name was rendered in many different ways, including Korzhenevski, Korzhenevskoi, and Korzhenievsky.

In 2020, the Tajik government renamed it to Ozodi Peak, which means Freedom Peak, to commemorate the country's sovereignty.

== Notable features ==
Ozodi Peak is one of the five seven-thousanders of the former Soviet Union (this counts Khan Tengri, which is more often given as 6,995 m) that were required for a climber to be awarded the Snow Leopard award, the highest honor given to Soviet mountaineers. It is usually said to be the second easiest of these peaks to climb, after Avicenna Peak. However, it is not a small mountain; its rise above local terrain rivals that of Ismoil Somoni Peak since it is closer to the deep valley of the Muksu River.

== Climbing history ==
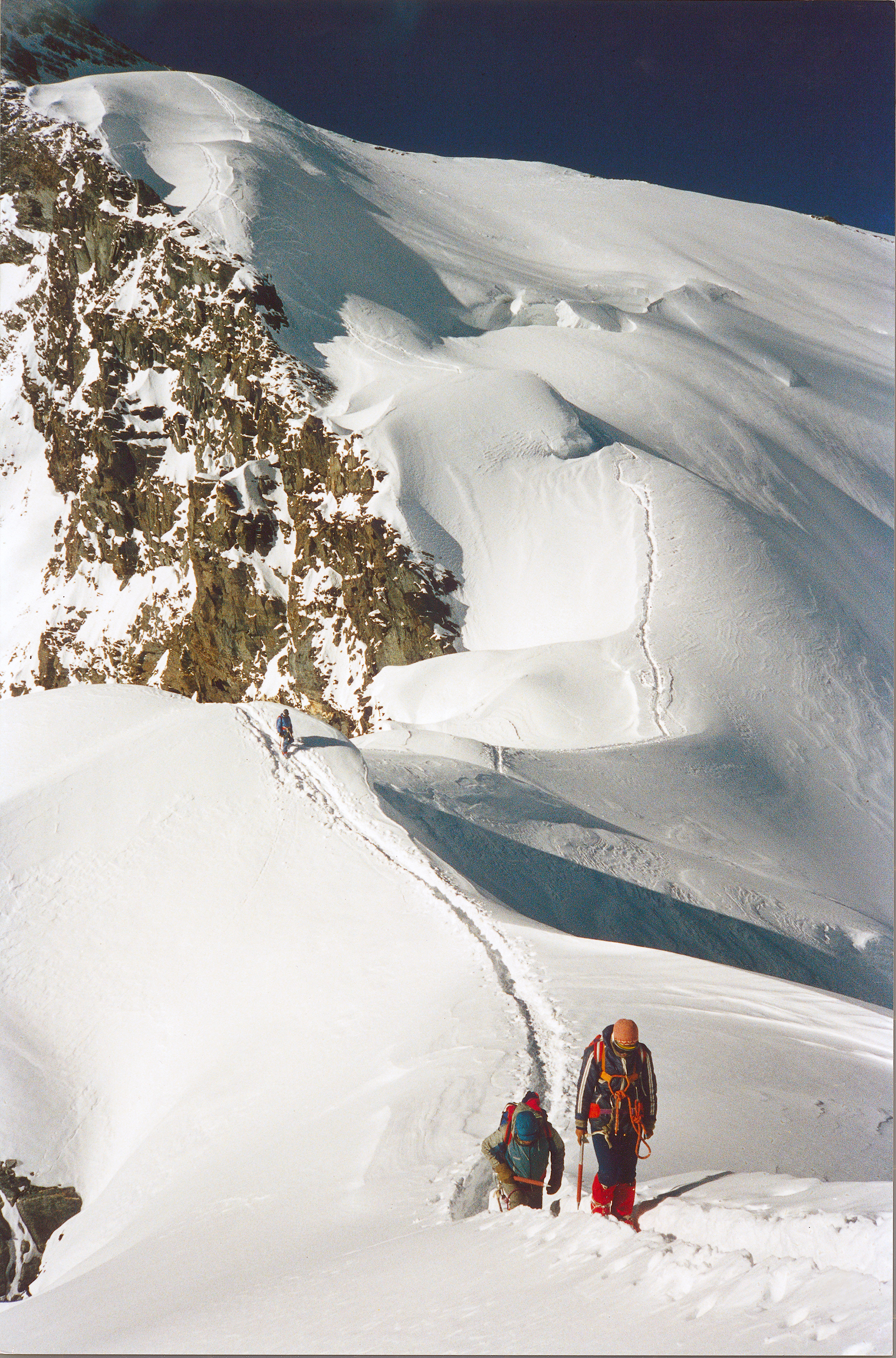
Descent from Korzhenevskaya. Jaan Künnap.

In 1937 D. Gushchin led an attempt on the peak which reached the lower summit (6,910 m).

Today's Ozodi Peak was first climbed in 1953 by a party led by A. Ugarov; the summit team comprised Ugarov, B. Dimitriev, A. Goziev, A. Kovyrkov, L. Krasavin, E. Ryspajev, R. Sielidzanov, and P. Skorobogatov. They approached via the Fortambek Glacier, to the Korzhenevsky glacier, and thence to the north ridge.

Partly since it is required for the Snow Leopard award, the Peak has been climbed many times; it is the second most frequented major peak in the Pamirs, after Avicenna Peak. A base camp on the moraine of the Moskvin Glacier, and helicopter access, make this possible. Ozodi Peak has been climbed from almost every direction, including a first winter ascent in 1987 by Anatoly Nosov; most of these ascents were by Russians. The most common current route on the mountain ascends from the south and attains the summit ridge from the west side.

== Sources ==
- Neate, Jill (1989). High Asia: An Illustrated History of the 7000 Metre Peaks. Seattle: The Mountaineers. ISBN 0-89886-238-8.
- Robin Collomb and Andrew Wielochowski, Pamir-Trans Alai Mountains, 1:200,000 scale map and guide, West Col Productions.
- DEM files (Corrected versions of SRTM data)
- Vladimir Shataev, Snow Leopards
