= Khan Tengri =

Mountain on the China–Kazakhstan–Kyrgyzstan tripoint

- Hantengri Peak
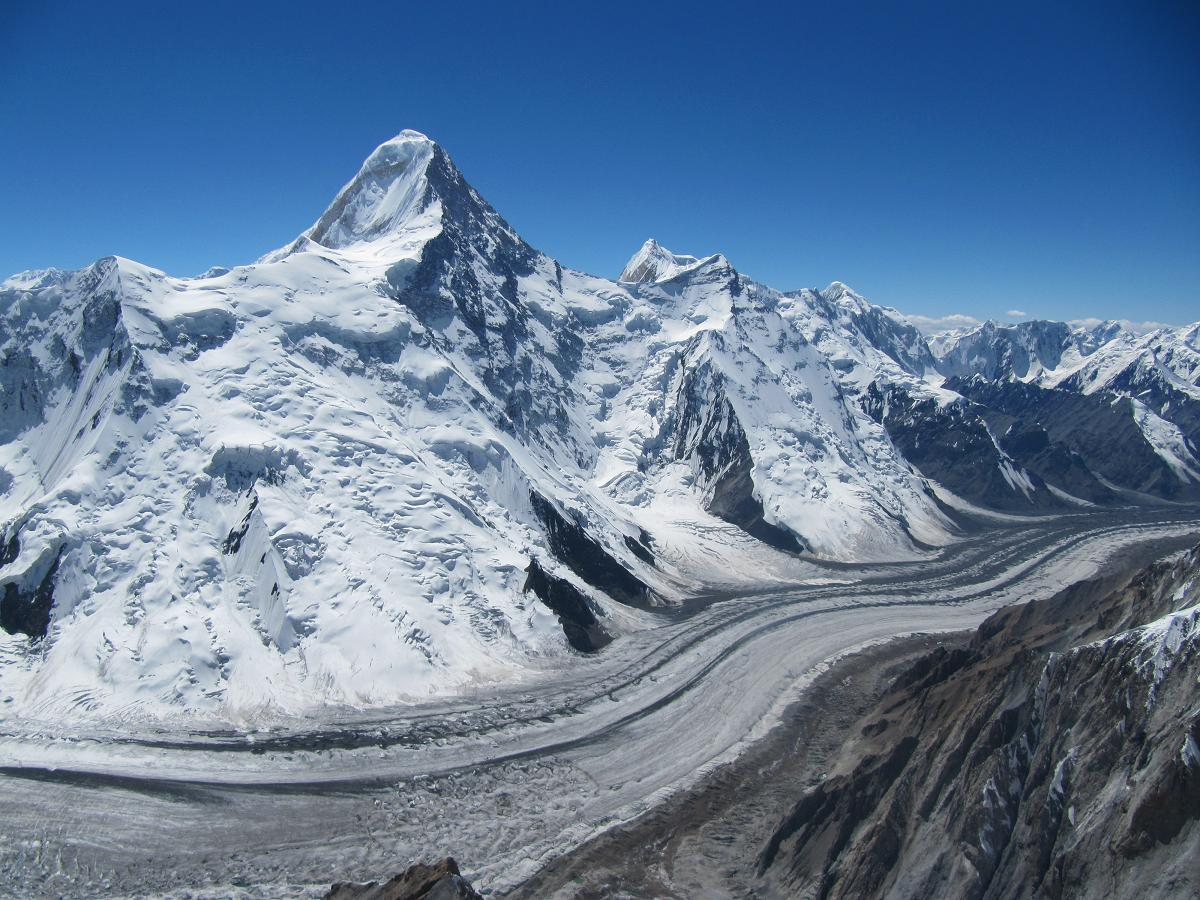
- Khan Tengri above North Engilchek Glacier

Highest point
- Elevation: 7,010 m (23,000 ft)
- Prominence: 1,685 m (5,528 ft)
- Isolation: 19.46 km (12.09 mi)
- Listing: Country high point Ultra
- Coordinates: 42°12′39″N 80°10′30″E

Geography
- Location within Asia Location within Kyrgyzstan Location within Kazakhstan Location within China Location within Xinjiang
- Location: Ak-Suu District, Issyk-Kul Region, Kyrgyzstan; Raiymbek District, Almaty Region, Kazakhstan; Wensu County, Xinjiang, China
- Parent range: Tian Shan

Climbing
- First ascent: 1931 Mikhail Pogrebetsky
- Easiest route: glacier/snow/ice/rock climb

Khan Tengri is a mountain of the Tian Shan mountain range in Central Asia. It is on the China—Kyrgyzstan—Kazakhstan tripoint, east of lake Issyk Kul in Kyrgyzstan. Its geologic elevation is 6,995 m (22,949 ft), but its glacial icecap rises to 7,010 m (22,999 ft). For this reason, in mountaineering circles, including for the Snow Leopard award criteria, it is considered a 7,000-metre peak.

Khan Tengri is the second-highest mountain in the Tian Shan, surpassed only by Jengish Chokusu (meaning 'Victory Peak' in the Kyrgyz language, formerly known as Peak Pobeda) (7,439 m). Khan Tengri is the highest point in Kazakhstan and third-highest peak in Kyrgyzstan, after Jengish Chokusu (7,439 m) and Avicenna Peak (7,134 m). It is also the world's most northern 7,000-metre peak, notable because peaks of high latitude have a shorter climbing season and generally more severe weather.

== Names ==
The name "Khan Tengri" literally means 'King Heaven' in Kyrgyz and Kazakh or 'King Sky' in Mongolian and possibly references the sky deity, Tengri, that exists both in the religion of Tengrism and Central Asian Buddhism. In some other local languages, it is known as Khan Tangiri Shyngy, Kan-Too Chokusu, Pik Khan-Tengry, and Hantengri Feng. (Mongolian: Хан Тэнгэр, Kazakh: Хан Тәңірі, romanized: Han Täñırı, حان تأڭئرئ; Kyrgyz: Хан-Теңири Han-Teñiri, حان-تەڭىرى; Uyghur: خانتەڭرى; simplified Chinese: 汗腾格里峰; traditional Chinese: 汗騰格里峰; pinyin: Hànténggélǐ Fēng, Xiao'erjing: هًا تٍْ قْ لِ فعْ). Local residents named the mountain Khan Tengri for the unique beauty of snow giants.

== Features ==
Khan Tengri is a massive marble pyramid, covered in snow and ice. At sunset the marble glows red, giving it the name "blood mountain" in Kazakh and Kyrgyz (Kazakh: Қантау; Kyrgyz: Кан-Тоо). Located just across the South Engilchek (or Inylchek) glacier, 16 km north of Jengish Chokusu, Khan Tengri was originally thought to be the highest peak in the Tian Shan because of its dramatic, steep shape, compared to the massive presence of Jengish Chokusu. This perception was probably also due to Khan Tengri's visibility across the plains of southern Kazakhstan while Jengish Chokusu remains out of view of civilization. Khan Tengri is the highest peak in the rugged Tengri Tag subrange, also known as the Mustag, that also contains Chapaev Peak (6,371 m; 20,902 ft) and Gorky Peak (6,050 m; 19,849 ft). Anatoli Boukreev considered Khan Tengri perhaps the world's most beautiful peak because of its geometric ridges and its symmetry.

== History ==
Although it is almost 430 m (1,410 ft) lower than its neighbor, Khan Tengri was believed to be the highest peak in the range until Jengish Chokusu was surveyed in 1943 and determined to be higher.

Peter Semenov was the first European to see the Tengri Tag and its peak, the colossal Khan Tengri (in 1857).

The first ascent of the peak was made in 1931 by Mikhail Pogrebetsky's Ukrainian team through a route from the south (Kyrgyzstan side), then along the west ridge. M. Kuzmin's team made the first ascent from the north (Kazakhstan side) in 1964. Khan Tengri is one of five peaks that a Soviet mountaineer needed to scale to earn the prestigious Snow Leopard award.

Anatoli Boukreev achieved the first solo speed ascent in 1990.

A team from Kazakhstan made the first winter ascent of Khan Tengri on February 7, 1992; the team included Valery Khrichtchatyi, Viktor Dedi, Yuri Moiseyev, Valdimir Suviga, Aleksandr Savin, Igor Putintsev and Malik Ismetov.

Austrian mountaineer and expedition leader Toni Dürnberger died while descending after having climbed Khan Tengri on August 17, 1992.

In 2004, more than a dozen mountaineers were killed in a large avalanche on the Pogrebetsky route, the most popular route on the mountain.

The peak appears on the 100 Kyrgyz som note.

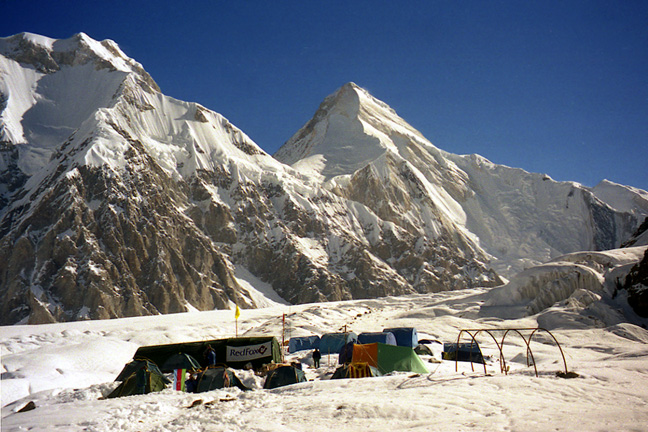
South Inylchek Base Camp, at 4,000 m on the glacier's southern moraine, looking northwest to Chapaev Peak and Khan Tengri in the distance

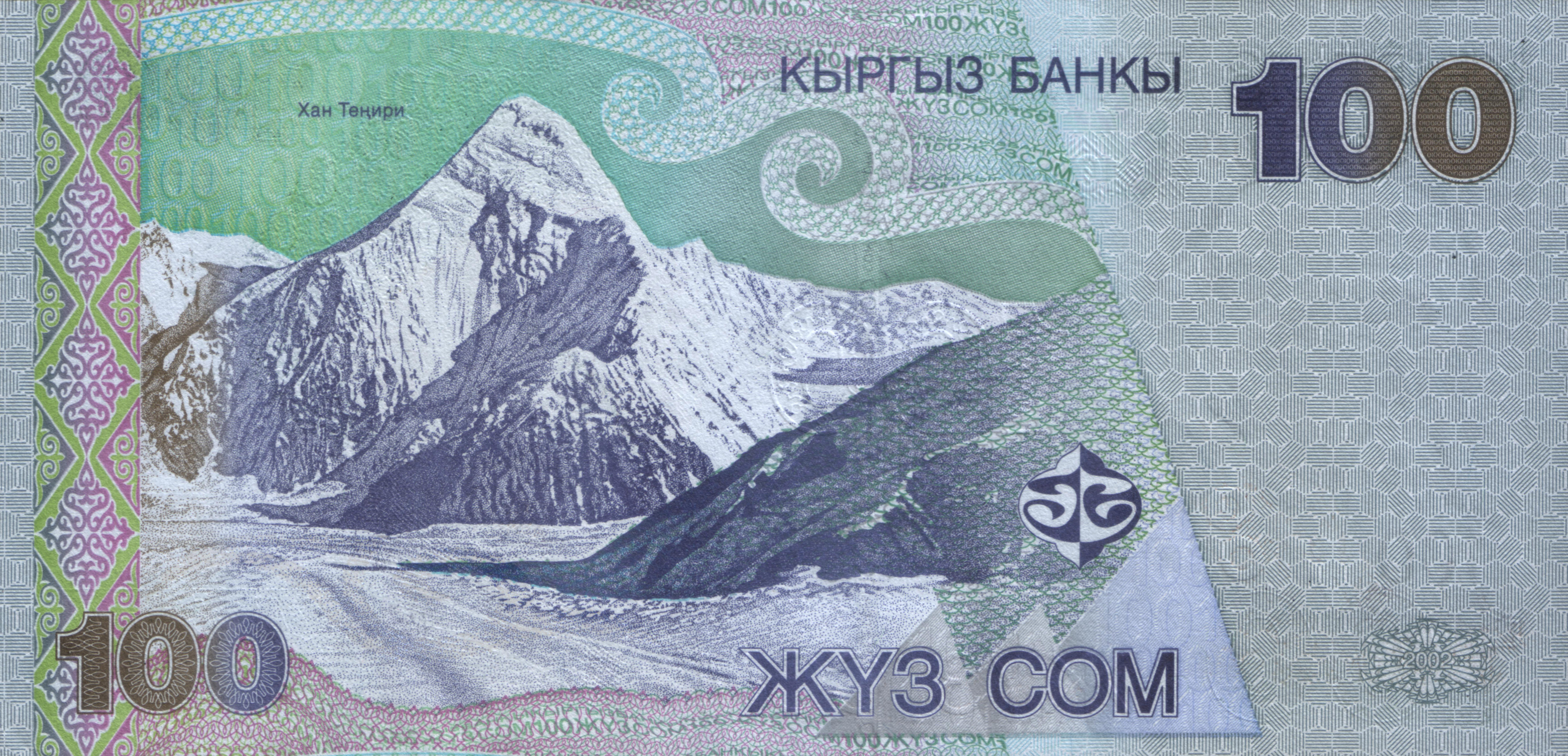
The peak appears on the 100 Kyrgyz som note

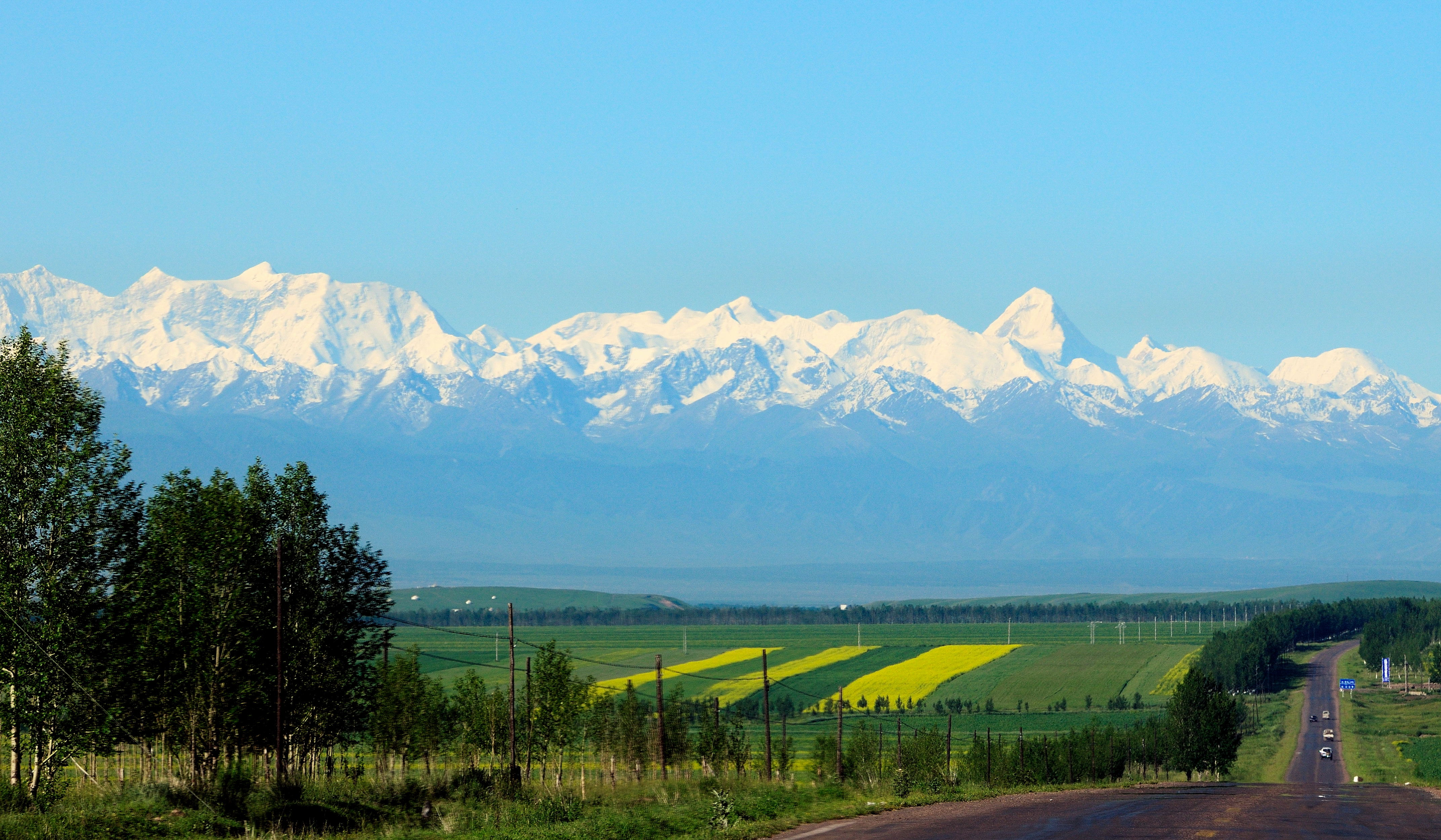
Khan Tengri and Jengish Chokusu as seen from Chinese Provincial Road S313

== See also ==
- List of ultras of Central Asia
