= Lenin Peak =

Mountain on the Kyrgyzstan–Tajikistan border

- Ibn Sina Peak
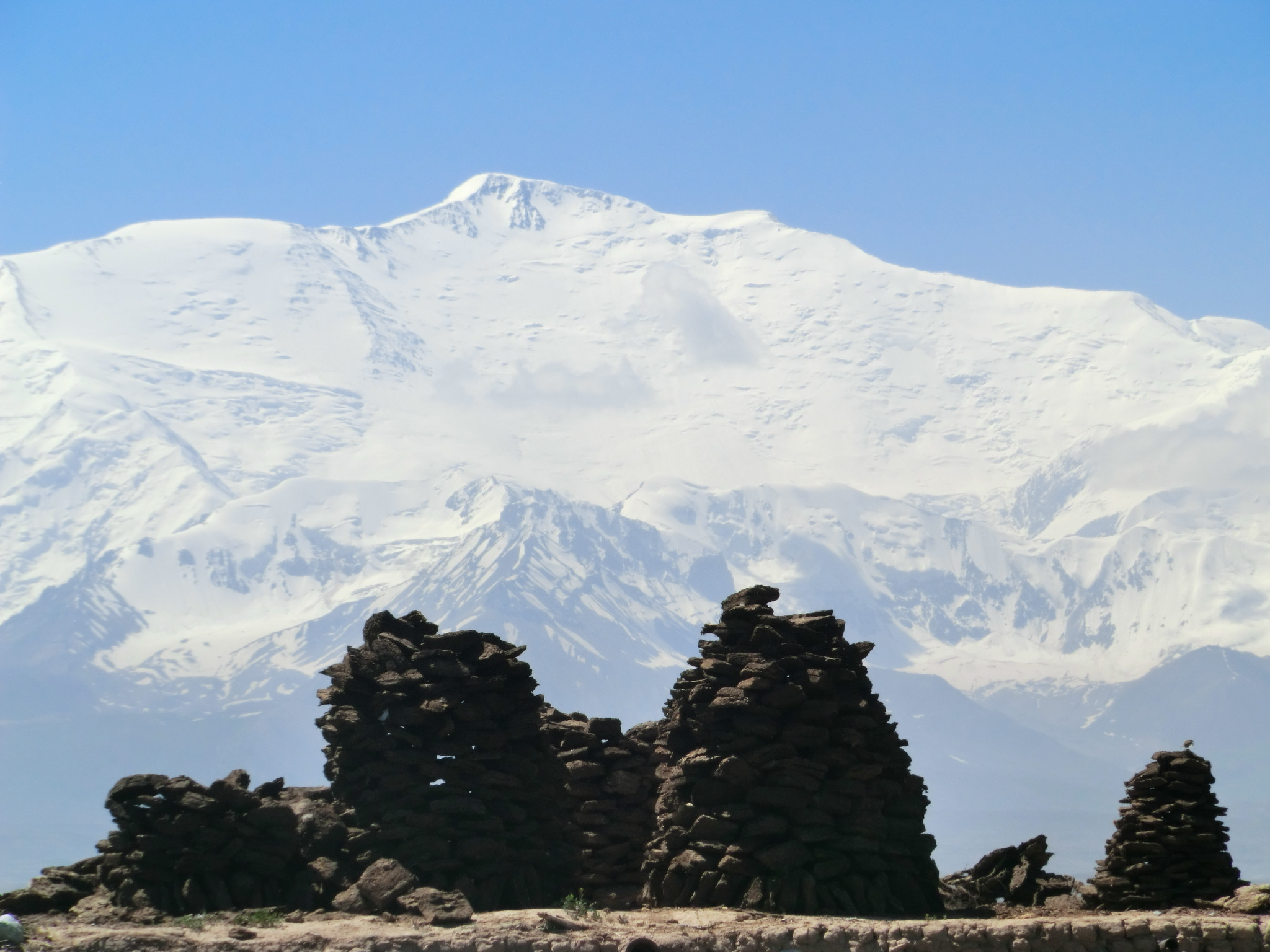
- Lenin Peak from Sary-Mogol

Highest point
- Elevation: 7,134 m (23,406 ft)
- Prominence: 2,853 m (9,360 ft)
- Isolation: 85.69 km (53.25 mi)
- Listing: Ultra
- Coordinates: 39°20′33″N 72°52′39″E

Geography
- Location within Tajikistan
- Location: Kyrgyzstan–Tajikistan border
- Parent range: Trans-Alay Range (Pamirs)

Climbing
- First ascent: 1928 by Karl Wien, Eugen Allwein and Erwin Schneider
- Easiest route: rock / snow / ice climb

Lenin Peak (Note: Kyrgyz: Ленин Чокусу, romanized: Lenin Choqusu, لەنىن چوقۇسۇ; Russian: Пик Ленина, romanized: Pik Lenina; Tajik: қуллаи Ленин, romanized: qulla‘i Lenin/qullaji Lenin, renamed қуллаи Абӯалӣ ибни Сино (qulla‘i Abûalî ibni Sino) in July 2006) or Ibn Sina (Avicenna) Peak is a mountain in the Trans-Alay Range of the Pamir Mountains, in the Gorno-Badakhshan and Osh regions on the Kyrgyzstan–Tajikistan border. At 7,134 metres (23,406 ft), it is the second-highest point of both countries (after Ismoil Somoni Peak in Tajikistan and Jengish Chokusu in Kyrgyzstan) and the tallest mountain of the Trans-Alay Range. It is considered one of the least technical 7,000 m peaks in the world to climb and has the most ascents of any peak over 7,000 metres, with hundreds of climbers attempting it annually.

Lenin Peak was thought to be the highest point in the Pamirs in Tajikistan until 1933, when Ismoil Somoni Peak (known as Stalin Peak at the time) was climbed and found to be more than 300 metres higher. Two mountains in the Pamirs in China, Kongur Tagh (7,649 m) and Muztagh Ata (7,546 m), are higher than the Tajik summits.

== Names ==
Lenin Peak was originally named Mount Kaufman after Konstantin Kaufman, the first Governor-General of Russian Turkestan. In 1928, the mountain was renamed Lenin Peak after the Russian revolutionary and first leader of the Soviet Union, Vladimir Lenin. In Tajikistan, the peak was renamed again in July 2006, and today it is officially called in Tajik Qullai Abuali ibni Sino (қуллаи Абӯалӣ ибни Сино, Ibn Sina Peak or, alternatively, Avicenna Peak) after Abu Ali ibn Sina (Avicenna).

In Kyrgyzstan, the peak is still officially called Lenin Chokusu (Ленин Чокусу, Lenin Peak). However, in October 2017, Kyrgyz president Almazbek Atambayev called for renaming the peak "Manas Peak", after the hero of the Epic of Manas. A peak named "Manas Peak" already exists in Kyrgyzstan; it is a mountain of 4,488 metres (14,724 ft) in the Talas Ala-Too range in Talas Region.

Local Kyrgyz names include Jel-Aidar ("Wind's God") and Achyk-Tash ("Open Rock"). Achik-Tash, is also the name of a plateau and a base camp at an elevation of 3,600 m on a popular northern climbing route to Lenin Peak, which starts in the southern Kyrgyz city of Osh, a day's drive north of the border. Another suggested local name, Pik Kaman ("wild pig", "boar") probably belongs to an officially unnamed peak west of Lenin Peak.

== Climbing history and routes ==
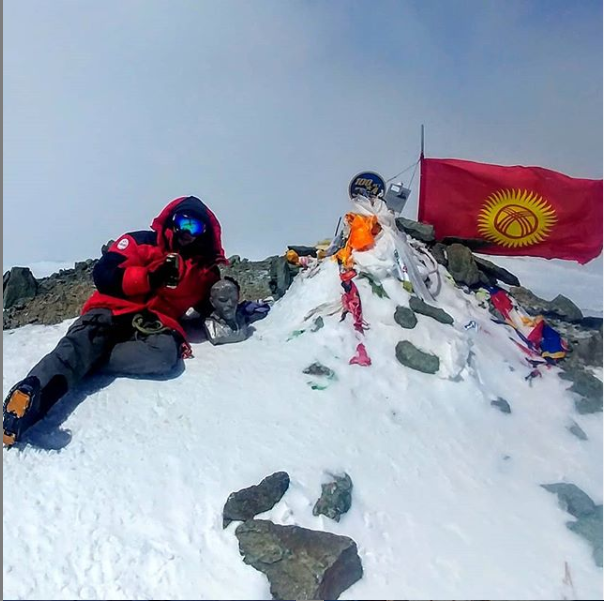
A climber poses on the summit of Lenin Peak next to the bust of Vladimir Lenin and the flag of Kyrgyzstan.

Initial exploration of this part of Central Asia occurred in the period 1774–82. Arguably the first recorded travel through the region is the involuntary journey of the slave Filipp Efremov (an ethnic Russian), who escaped from slavery in Bukhara. He crossed the Fergana valley, then via Osh, the Chigirik Pass and Terekdavan Pass he reached the Kashgar and finally came over the Karakorum. He was the first European who crossed the Alai Mountains.

Scientific expeditions to the Alai Mountains began in 1871, when Alexei Pavlovich Fedchenko discovered the Trans-Alai (Zaalayskiy) Range and its main peak. The first geographical expedition which came nearest to the base of the future Lenin Peak in the early 20th century was arguably the expedition of Nikolai Leopol'dovich Korzhenevskiy.

In September 1928, three mountaineers—the Germans Eugen Allwein and Karl Wien, and the Austrian Erwin Schneider—from the Soviet-German scientific expedition made the first attempt to reach the highest point of the Trans-Alai Range, which at that time had the name Kaufman Peak. They started climbing upstream of the Saukdara river along the South slope of Trans-Alai Range also Trans-Alay Range. From the river head they continued climbing along the Greater Saukdara Glacier towards a saddle at an elevation of 5820 m (this saddle is also known as the Krilenko Pass). On September 25, 1928, they started climbing from the saddle along the NE Ridge and at 15.30 they reached the summit. At the time, Kaufman Peak was the highest summit reached in the world. Schneider himself broke that record two years later when he made the first ascent of Jongsong Peak.

The title Lenin Peak was first applied to the highest point of the Trans-Alai Range in the same year (1928). When it was renamed after Lenin it was believed to be the highest point in the USSR.

On September 8, 1934, at 16:20 Kasian Chernuha, Vitaly Abalakov and Ivan Lukin, three members of a Soviet expedition, reached the summit at an elevation of 7,134 metres (23,406 ft). Their attempt lasted for four days with three camps (5,700 m, 6,500 m and 7,000 m). The expedition started climbing from the Achik-Tash canyon in the Alai valley. The summit attempt itself was started along the Western ice slope of the Lenin glacier. They continued climbing along the North Face, passing the rocks that were later given the name Lipkin's Rocks. At the end of the second day they reached the crest of the NE ridge at an elevation of about 6500 m. During the following day and a half they climbed along the NE Ridge and, utterly exhausted, reached the summit.

The third ascent was three years later, in 1937, when eight Soviet climbers under the direction of Lev Barkhash reached the summit by the same route. This was at the beginning of mass political repressions in the Soviet Union and many of the most prominent Soviet climbers, including Lev Barkhash, were brought to trial.

Subsequent attempts to climb Lenin Peak could not begin until 1950, when the USSR began to recover from the Second World War. On August 14, 1950, twelve climbers (V. Aksenov, K, Zaporojchenko, Y. Izrael, V. Kovalev, A. Kormshikov, Y. Maslov, E. Nagel, V. Narishkin, V. Nikonov, V. Nozdryuhin, I. Rojkov) under the direction of Vladimir Racek reached the summit for the fourth time.

All three Soviet expeditions including Racec's expedition of 1950 were by almost the same route via the NE Ridge.

The route which now is known as the classic route, via the Razdelnaya Peak and NW Ridge, was first climbed in 1954 by a team of Soviet climbers under the direction of V. Kovalev (P. Karpov, E. Nagel, V. Narishkin, V. Nozdryuhin).

In 1958 the first female ascent of the peak was achieved by Soviet Alpinist Ekaterina Mamleeva.

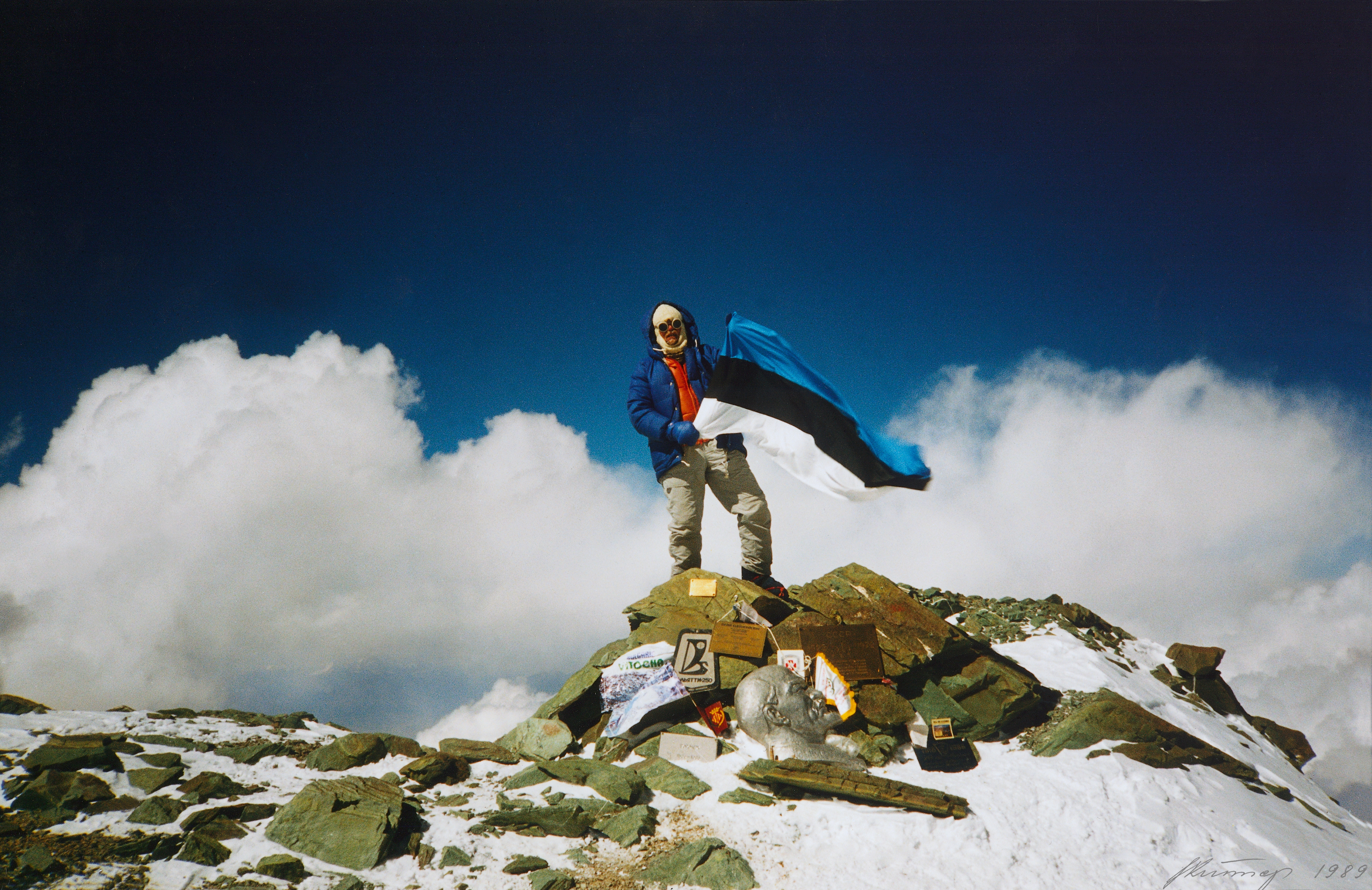
Jaan Künnap, a decorated Estonian mountaineer, at the top of Lenin Peak in 1989. This marked the first time an Estonian flag was flown at an altitude over 7,000 m.

In 1960, a group of eight Soviet climbers made a successful direct climb along the North Face (15.08.1960).

There are 16 established routes, nine on the southern side and seven on the northern slopes. The peak is quite popular with climbers due to its easy access and some uncomplicated routes. However, the peak is not without its share of disasters.

In August 1974, an entire team of eight Russian women climbers died high on the mountain in a storm. Elwira Szatajewa maintained radio contact with base camp as her team-mates perished around her. In her final words she said, 'I'm alone now, with just a few minutes left to live. See you in eternity.'

The first high-speed ascent of Lenin Peak was completed in 1987. The team, led by Valery Khrichtchatyi, included G. Lunyakov, Z. Khalitov, Anatoli Boukreev, V. Suviga, Y. Moiseev and A. Tselischev. The climb beginning from ABC base camp (4400 m) to the summit and return to ABC base camp took 12 hours.

Under the leadership of Leonid Troshchinenko the team, composed of 19 mountaineers from Leningrad and three from Kazakhstan, made the first winter ascent of Lenin Peak in 1988. With temperatures hovering at -45 °C, only six men reached the summit: including Valery Khrichtchatyi, Balyberdin, S. Arsentiev, U. Moiseev, I. Tulaiev and V. Dedi.

In 1987 the first solo ascent was achieved by the high altitude mountaineer Anatoli Boukreev.

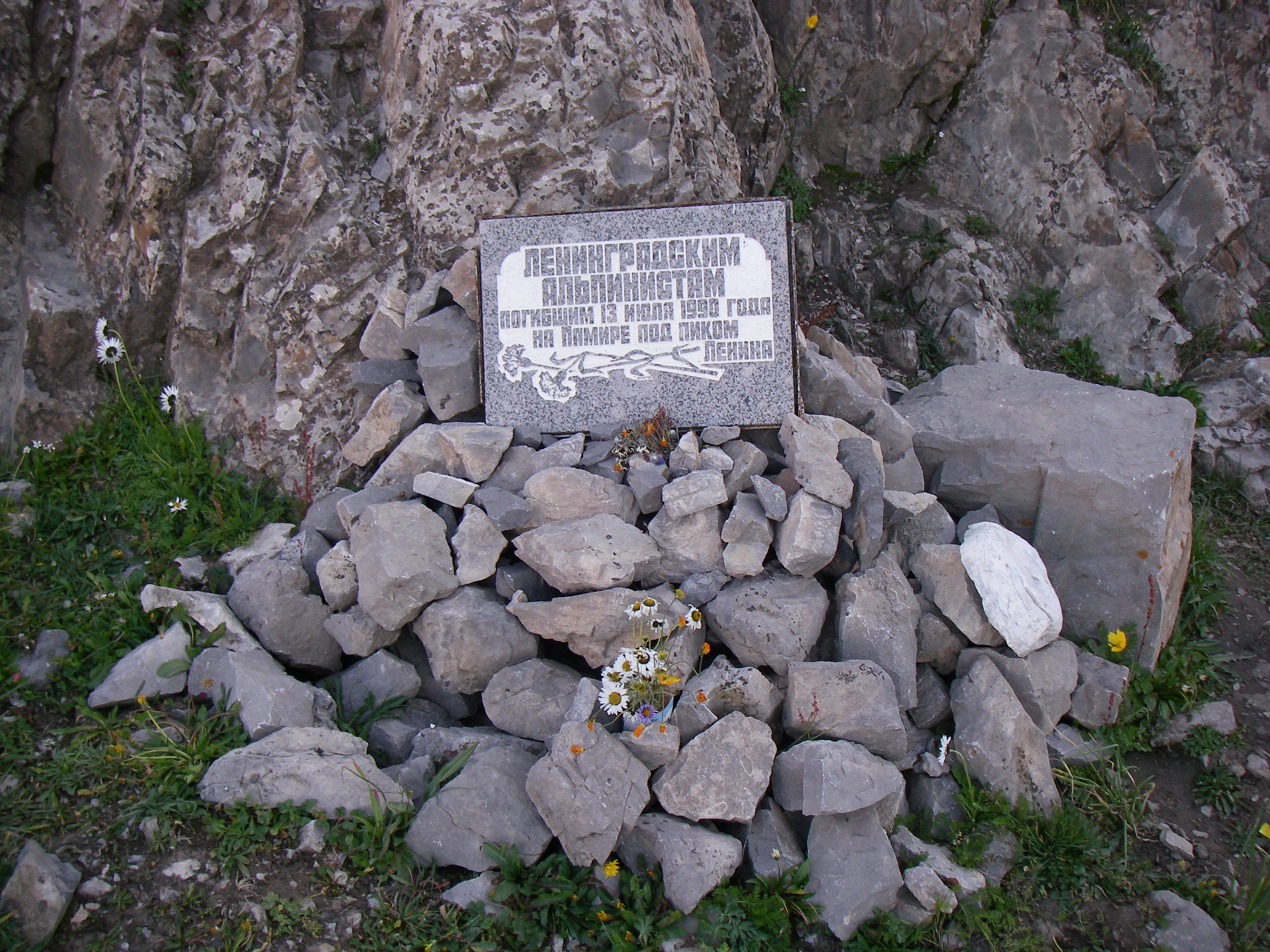
Memorial to the victims of the avalanche of 1990

An avalanche triggered by an earthquake killed 43 climbers in 1990.

As it is now, in consideration of an existing infrastructure and BC/ABC location, there are three most frequently used routes from the North (as it is approximately indicated on the Scheme): Lipkin's rocks route and NE Ridge; North Face classical route; Razdelnaya route and NW Ridge
