= Jengish Chokusu =

Highest point in Kyrgyzstan

- Victory Peak
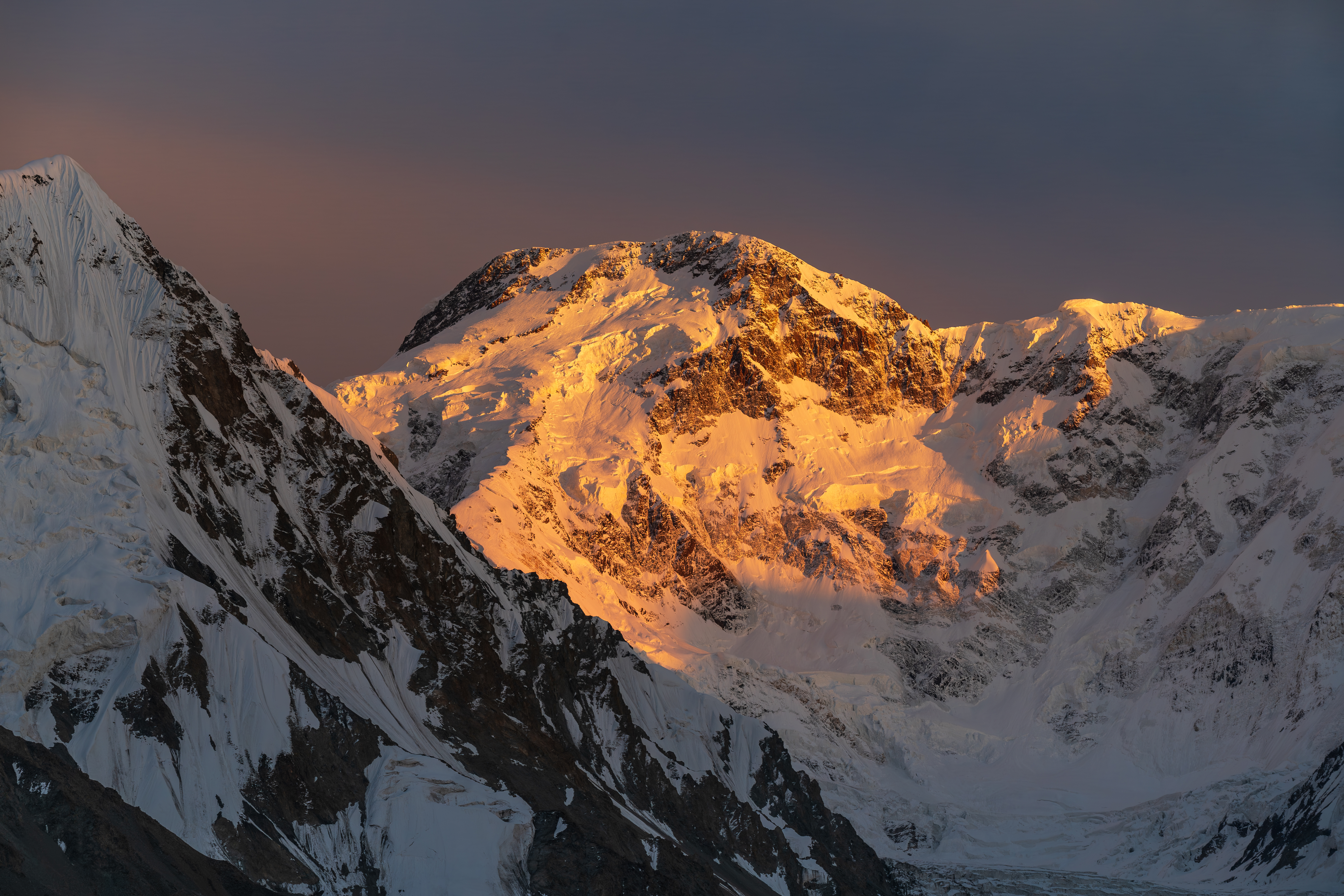
- Jengish Chokusu, view from base camp on Engilchek Glacier, Kyrgyzstan

Highest point
- Elevation: 7,439 m (24,406 ft); Ranked 60th
- Prominence: 4,148 m (13,609 ft); Ranked 16th
- Listing: Country high point Ultra
- Coordinates: 42°02′15″N 80°07′30″E

Naming
- Native name: Жеңиш чокусу (Kyrgyz); جەڭىش چوقۇسۇ (Kyrgyz); تۆمۈر چوققىسى (Uyghur); 托木尔峰 (Chinese)

Geography
- Location within Southern Xinjiang Location within Kyrgyzstan
- Location: Ak-Suu, Issyk-Kul, Kyrgyzstan; Wensu County, Xinjiang, China
- Parent range: Kakshaal Too, Tian Shan

Climbing
- First ascent: 1956 by Vitaly Abalakov
- Easiest route: Snow/ice climb

The Jengish Chokusu (Note: /ˈdʒɛŋɪʃ ˈtʃɒkʊsu/ JENG-ish CHOK-uu-soo; Kyrgyz: Жеңиш чокусу, romanized: Jeñiş çokusu, arabized: جەڭىش چوقۇسۇ, pronounced [dʒeŋˈɪʃ tʃoqʊˈsʊ]; simplified Chinese: 托木尔峰; traditional Chinese: 托木爾峰; pinyin: Tuōmù'ěr fēng; Cantonese Yale: Tokmuhkyíh fūng; Dungan: Туәмур фын; Russian: пик Победы, romanized: pik Pobedy, pronounced [pʲik pɐˈbʲɛdɨ]) is the highest mountain in the Tian Shan mountain system in Central Asia at 7,439 metres (24,406 ft). It lies on the China–Kyrgyzstan border between the Ak-Suu District in the Issyk-Kul Region of far eastern Kyrgyzstan and Wensu County, Xinjiang, China. It is part of the Kakshaal Too, the highest part of the Tian Shan, and is southeast of lake Issyk-Kul. Jengish Chokusu is the 16th most prominent peak on Earth.

== Names ==
The mountain is called Jengish Chokusu (its official Kyrgyz name) or Pobeda Peak (from the Russian name Pik Pobedy), both names translating as “Victory Peak.” On the Chinese side it is known as Tomur Peak (Tuomuer Feng in Chinese) from its Uyghur name Tömür meaning “iron.”

== Description ==
Mi-8 taking off from South Inylchek base camp

Jengish Chokusu is a massif, with several summits along its lengthy ridge. Only its main summit breaks 7,000 metres (22,966 ft). It is 16 km (9.9 mi) southwest of Khan Tengri (7,010 m/23,000 ft), from which it is separated by the South Engilchek Glacier, where base camps for both mountains are usually located.

The massif runs at right angles to the glaciers which flow from it into three alpine valleys in Kyrgyzstan on the north, all eventually running to the Engilchek Glacier, the largest in the Tian Shan. Its main summit is usually approached from the Zvozdochka (Russian for "little star") glacier, which is coloured red with rocks from Jengish Chokusu.

Administratively, the Kyrgyzstan side of the mountain is in the Ak-Suu District of Issyk-Kul Region, and the Chinese side in Wensu County of the Aksu Prefecture of Xinjiang Uyghur Autonomous Region.

== Geology ==
Jengish Chokusu consists of low-grade black schists, volcanoclastic metasandstones, marbles, and metabasites overlain by high-grade metamorphic charnockites. The overlying charnockite have been overthrust northward over the metasedimentary rocks along a major thrust fault that is called the Pobeda thrust. The charnockites underlie the highest part and southern slopes of the Pobeda Massif and Jengish Chokusu. The northern slopes of the Pobeda Massif and Jengish Chokusu are undelain by the low-grade metasedimentary rocks. These rocks are part of a kilometers-thick stack of thrust sheets, known as nappes, consisting of fault-bound sheets of metamorphosed Devonian to Carboniferous sedimentary strata.

The charnockites consists of clinopyroxene, orthopyroxene, and olivine. The charnockites contain migmatized paragneisses, and marbles. The paragneisses consist mainly of feldspar, quartz, biotite, and pyroxene and have been in areas partially melted to form decimeter- to meter-scale granitic dikes. The paragneisses have sharp contacts with the charnockites. Epidote-tourmaline bearing marbles occur as recumbent isoclinal folds within the charnockites.

== Records ==
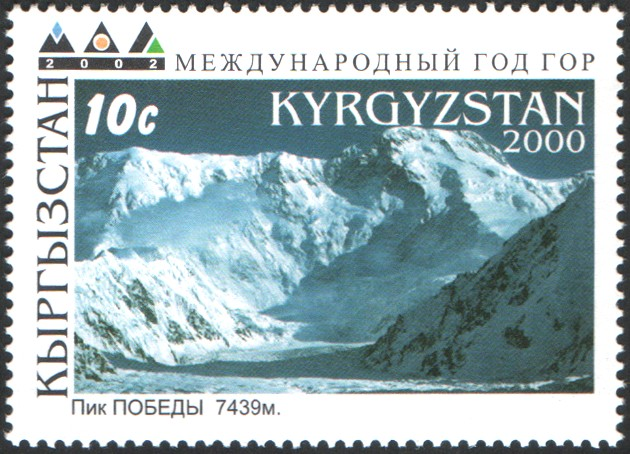
Jengish Chokusu (Pobeda Peak) on a Kyrgyzstan stamp'. (Note that the image of the peak is mirrored on the stamp.)

Jengish Chokusu is the highest mountain in Kyrgyzstan and Earth's highest mountain north of 39°N. It is considered the most northerly 7,000-metre mountain in the world by geologists; the actual rock summit of Khan Tengri, the Tian Shan's second-highest peak, is 6,995m above sea level, though a thick layer of ice adds another 15m to its altitude, such that mountaineers consider it a 7,000m peak.

The South Engilchek Glacier and its side glaciers occupy the entire north side of Peak Jengish Chokusu. This glacier, currently 60.5 kilometres (37.6 mi) long, is the sixth longest outside of the world's polar regions.

== History ==
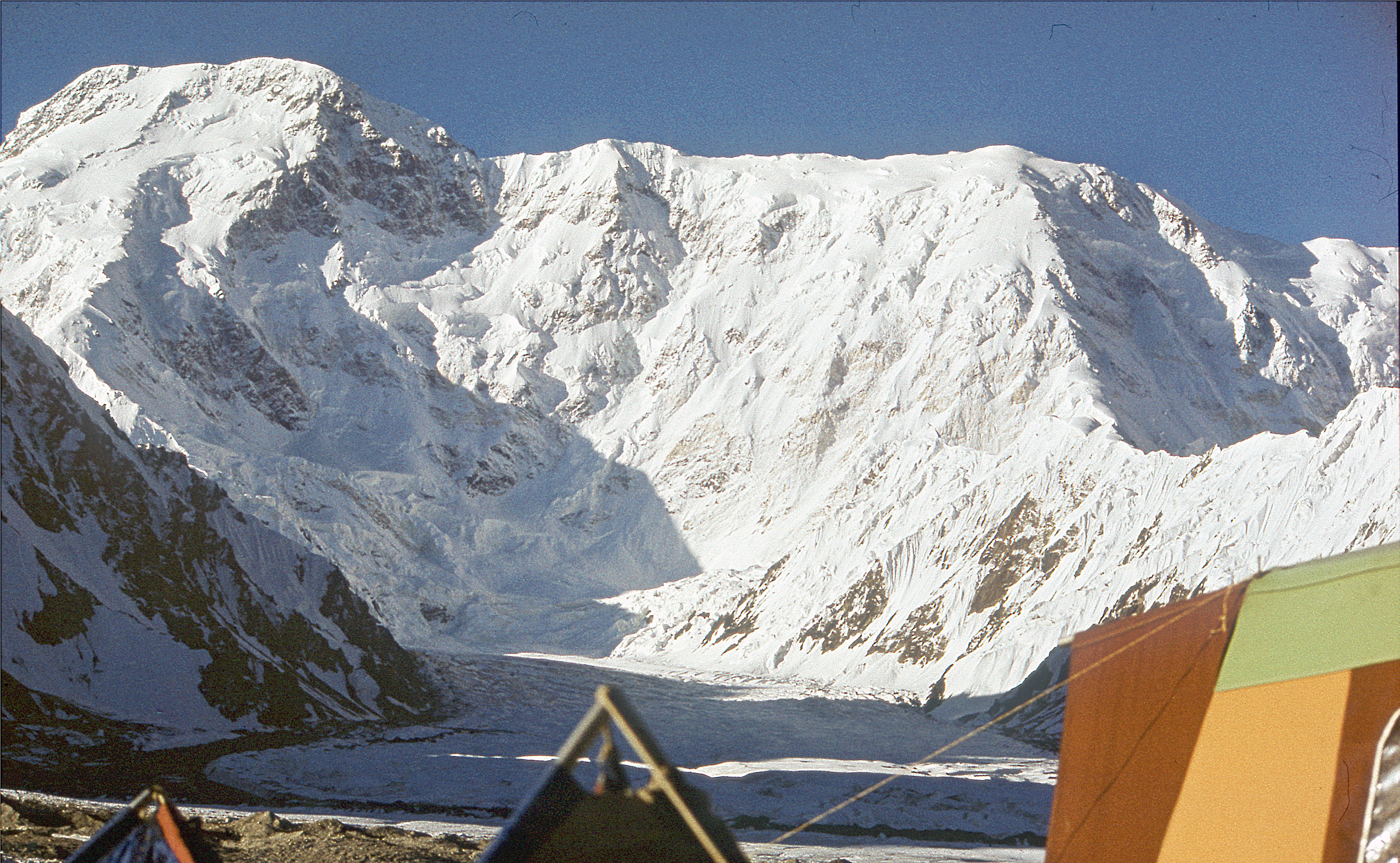
Peak seen in 1987. Photo by Jaan Künnap.

Although Jengish Chokusu is over 400 metres higher, Khan Tengri was believed to be the highest peak in the range until Jengish Chokusu's survey in 1943.^{[4]}

A Soviet expedition mounted in 1938 to mark the 20th anniversary of the founding of the Communist Youth movement Komsomol claimed to have climbed the highest peak in the area, the summit being reached on 19 September by L. Gutman, E. Ivanov and A. Sidorenko. They measured the altitude as 6,900 metres, and named the peak Pik 20-ti letiya Komsomola (Peak of the 20th Anniversary of Komsomol).

A survey by another team in 1943 found the peak to be 7,439 metres high. The peak was renamed as Pik Pobedy (Victory's Peak) in 1946 to commemorate the Soviet victory in World War II. The significant difference in altitude between the two measurements led to the 1938 ascent being called into question, although the official Soviet stance was to uphold the 1938 ascent.

A large-scale attempt on the peak in 1955 was disastrous, when 11 of the 12 expedition members were killed in a blizzard. Jengish Chokusu's first indisputably verified ascent was in 1956 by Vitaly Abalakov's party. Ural Usenov—the only survivor of the 1955 expedition—accompanied Abalakov on the ascent.

A Chinese expedition climbed the peak from the Chinese side in 1977: the expedition book makes no mention of the Russian first ascent and gives the impression that the Chinese ascent was the first climb.

The first winter ascent of Peak Pobeda was made by Valery Khrichtchatyi (team leader), S. Ovcharenko, G. Mikhailov, and brothers G. Bogomolov and S. Bogomolov on February 2, 1990.

As of 2025, more than 80 climbers have died on Jengish Chokusu. One of them was Natalia Nagovitsina (August 20, 1977 – August 27, 2025), a Russian climber who became stranded on the Victory Peak in August 2025, where she remained for 15 days before her presumed death. She worked in tourism before moving to Moscow, where she was employed by an organisation under the Central Election Commission responsible for the GAS electoral system. She began mountaineering in 2016, led an expedition to Elbrus’s eastern peak in 2020, and completed over 30 ascents, including her first climb of Pobeda Peak that same year.

In 2021, while climbing Khan Tengri with her husband Sergei, he suffered a fatal stroke at 6,900 metres. Nagovitsina refused to descend despite rescue advice. She returned to Khan Tengri in 2022, where she met Italian climber Luca Sinigaglia. On August 12, 2025, while descending Pobeda Peak, Nagovitsina fell, fractured her leg, and was stranded on a ridge. Fellow climber Roman Mokrinsky gave her first aid and descended for help. Sinigaglia and German climber Gunther Siegmund reached her on August 13, bringing supplies, but during their descent, Sinigaglia suffered frostbite and later died of suspected cerebral oedema on August 15.

Crashed Mi-8

A helicopter evacuation attempt on August 17 failed due to bad weather, injuring two rescuers and a pilot. On August 23, the Kyrgyz Ministry of Emergency Situations suspended the search due to severe conditions. Aerial reconnaissance on August 27 revealed no signs of life, and Ak-Sai Travel declared the rescue impossible. Over 80 climbers have perished on Pobeda Peak, none of whose bodies have been retrieved.
