= Alfred Schwarzenbach Sr. =

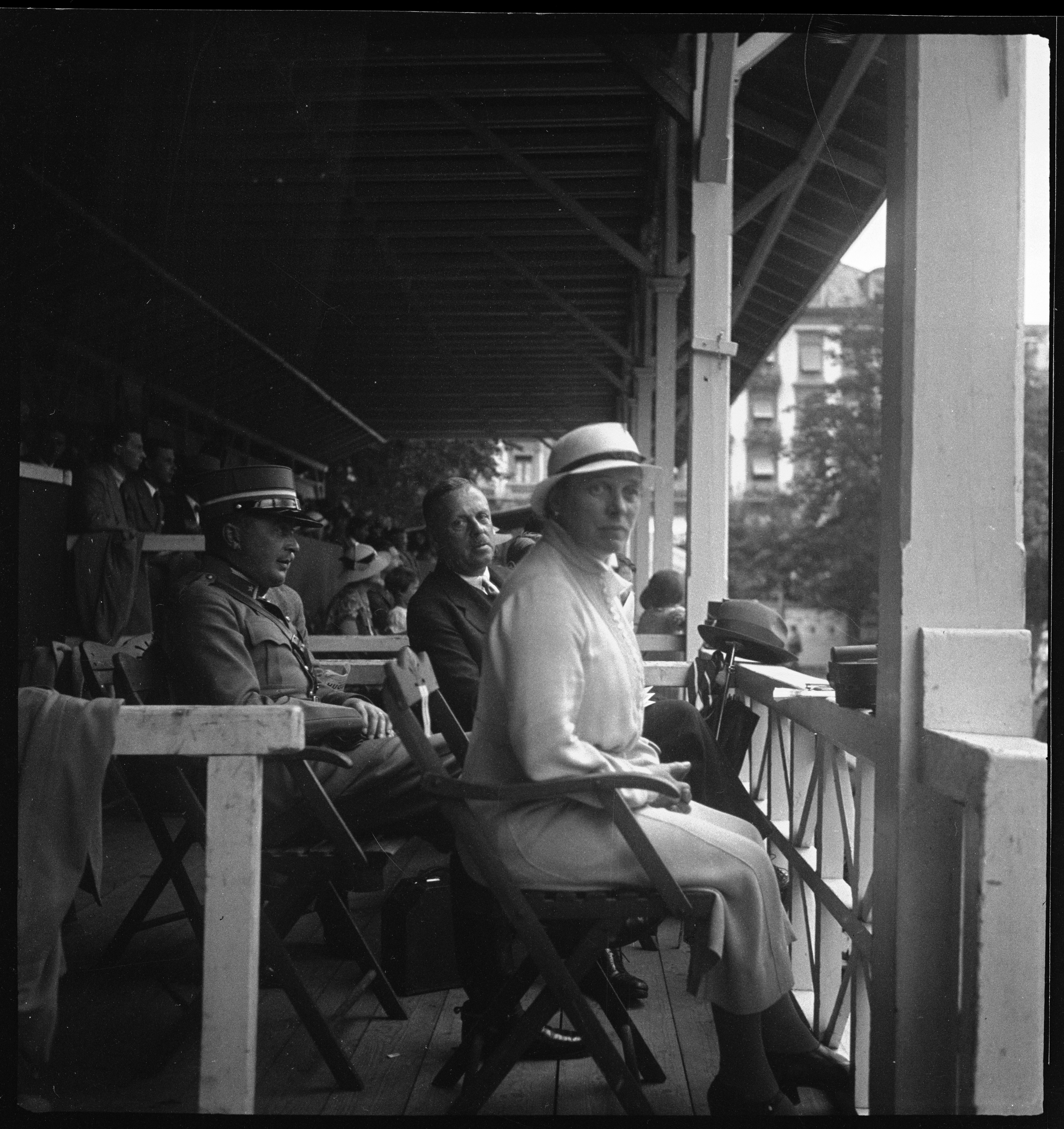
- Alfred Schwarzenbach (middle) with his wife Renée Schwarzenbach-Wille (right)

Member of the Cantonal Council of Zurich
- In office 1910–1912

Personal details
- Born: Alfred Emil Schwarzenbach; 22 October 1876 Zurich, Switzerland
- Died: 17 November 1940 (aged 64) Horgen, Switzerland
- Spouse: Maria Renée Wille (m. 1904)
- Relations: Alfred Schwarzenbach (grandson)
- Children: 5
- Occupation: Industrialist, businessman, politician, equestrian, philanthropist

Alfred Emil Schwarzenbach colloquially Alfred Schwarzenbach Sr. (22 October 1876 – 17 November 1940) was a Swiss industrialist, equestrian, philanthropist and politician who served on the Cantonal Council of Zurich from 1910 to 1912.

Schwarzenbach served as president of Schwarzenbach Enterprises since 1904. He also held several notable board memberships such as Brown, Boveri & Cie (BBC), Elektrowatt as well as Credit Suisse.

== Early life and education ==
Schwarzenbach was born 22 October 1876 in Zurich, Switzerland, the third of five children, to Heinrich "Robert" Schwarzenbach (1839–1904), a silk industrialist, and Elisabeth Wilhelmine "Mina" Schwarzenbach (née Zeuner; 1852–1942), into an affluent Protestant family.

His paternal family was originally from Thalwil, where his grandfather, Johannes Schwarzenbach (1804–1861), founded what ultimately would become Schwarzenbach Enterprises, under the leadership of his father. His siblings were Emma "Emmy" Rudolph (née Schwarzenbach; 1873–1970), Robert "Roby" Schwarzenbach (1875–1929), Edwin Schwarzenbach (1878–1952) and Olga Reinhart (1881–1970).

He attended schools in Zurich and then studied Law at the Berlin University and the Leipzig University graduating with a Doctorate in 1901.

== Personal life ==
In 1904, Schwarzenbach married Maria Renée Wille, colloquially Renée Wille (1883–1959), daughter of Ulrich Wille and Clara von Bismarck (1851–1946), at Bocken estate in Horgen on Lake Zurich. They had five children;

- Robert Ulrich Schwarzenbach (1904–1973), was born with congenital hearing loss, never married and without issue
- Suzanne Amelie Schwarzenbach (1906–1999), married firstly Swedish-born Torgny Eric Oehman, with whom she had one daughter.
- Annemarie Schwarzenbach (1908–1942), author, writer and photographer, married to Claude Clarac (1903–1999), who was a French diplomat. Their marriage was strategically arranged.
- Alfred Friedrich August "Freddy" Schwarzenbach (1911–1998), married Itala Bianchi (1910–2002), with whom he had two daughters.
- Hans Robert "Hasi" Schwarzenbach (1913–1993), married to American-born Swiss Adrienne Elizabeth Anna Veillon (1915–2002), who was born in St. Louis, Missouri, to a Swiss-born father and a French-born mother. They had two sons, including Alfred Schwarzenbach, a Swiss equestrian and businessman.

Schwarzenbach passed away on 17 November 1940 in Horgen, Switzerland.
