= Lorenz Saladin =

Swiss mountain climber, journalist and photographer (1896–1936)

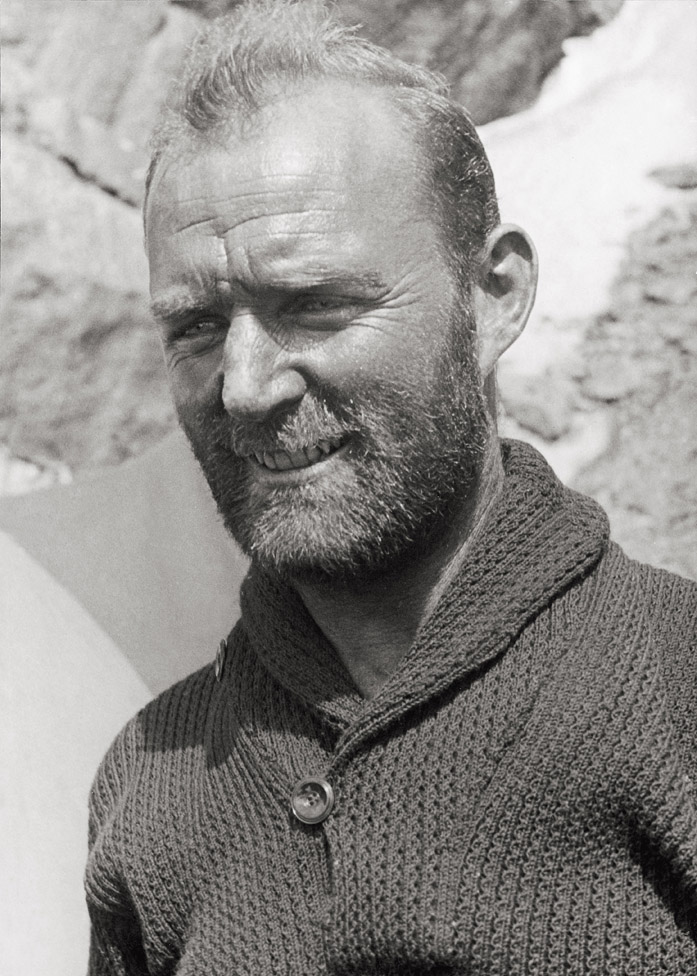
- Lorenz Saladin (1935)

Personal information
- Nationality: Swiss
- Born: 28 October 1896 Nuglar-St. Pantaleon, Solothurn, Switzerland
- Died: 17 September 1936 (aged 39) Khan Tengri, Pamirs, Kyrgyzstan

Climbing career
- Major ascents: First Swiss expedition to the Caucasus, 1932

Lorenz Saladin (28 October 1896 – 17 September 1936), was a Swiss mountain-climber, journalist, photographer and traveler. His large archive of photographs and reports of his expeditions were discovered in Russian sources in 2008.

== Life ==
Saladin was born in Nuglar-St. Pantaleon, in the canton of Solothurn in Switzerland. He came from a modest background, and ended up in a home when his parents divorced. He worked at different jobs and during WW1 was patrolling the Swiss frontier. Between 1920 and 1932 he travelled through Europe, South America and the US, taking on whatever odd jobs he could find. During this time he started to take an interest in photography and became a first-class photographer. Politically he was a member of the Communist Party of Switzerland (KPS).

He had always taken a great interest in mountain climbing and in Switzerland was a member of several climbing clubs. In 1932, he took part in the first Swiss expedition to the Caucasus with a ski club from Zurich and contributed reports and photographs to the press. With his colleague Werner Wickert he climbed the Ushba peak, considered by many climbers as the most difficult ascent in the Caucasus.

He became acquainted with the Moscow student and climber Georgi Charlampiew. In 1934, Charlampiew helped him organize his own climbing expedition to the Caucasus. A mountain, Pik Saladin, was named after him.

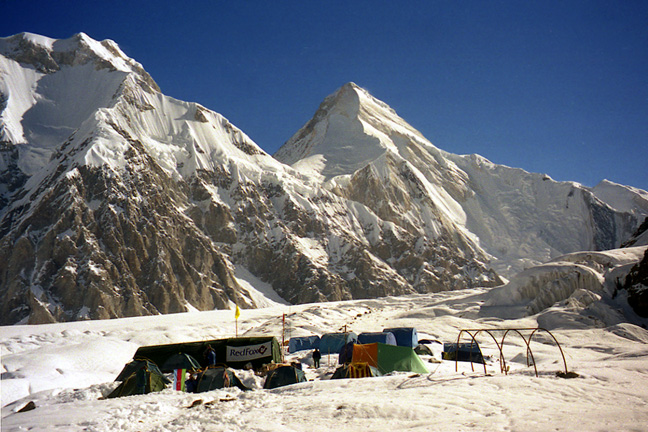
South Engil'chek Base Camp, at 4,000 m, showing Khan Tengri in the distance

Grave of Lorenz Saladin

The following year, he intended joining five Russian friends, Georgi Charlampiew, Michail Dadiomow, Leonid Gutman, the sculptor Yevgeniy Abalakov and his brother Vitaly on a geological expedition to climb the 7546-meter high Mustagh Ata in China. They were being financed by the Russian trade-union federation, however, they did not receive the necessary permits from the Chinese authorities. They then decided, rather too hastily, to attempt the 7200-meter high Khan Tengri in the Pamirs. Khan Tengri is the world's most northern 7000-meter peak, notable because it has a shorter climbing season, generally more severe weather and thinner air. This was the wrong time of year for such a difficult task and the lack of preparation led to a disaster. They reached the summit on 5 September, but on the descent through a snowstorm Gutman fell and was badly injured and all of the climbers suffered from severe frostbite. Saladin amputated the black portions of his hands with a pocket-knife and disinfected them with petrol. However, he died of blood poisoning. His grave near the Engil'chek Glacier was discovered only in 2008.

== Heritage ==
The Swiss photographer and writer Annemarie Schwarzenbach, a fellow-countryman and photographer, had followed Saladin's reports in magazines and recognized the quality of his photographs. She was also fascinated by his fearless attitude to life, his confidence in the face of difficulties, and the force of his political convictions. Preserving his legacy, which she viewed as a counterpoint to Switzerland's insular neutrality, became, for Schwarzenbach, both a personal and ideological obligation. In 1937 she travelled to Moscow, researched his work and wrote a number of articles. These were assembled into a comprehensive biography, with a preface by Sven Hedin, which quickly sold out.

During the Second World War Saladin's photographs went missing. While researching for a new edition of Schwarzenbach's book the writers Robert Steiner and Emil Zopfi came across Saladin's photo archive in Moscow. His archives were later transferred to the Swiss Alpine Museum in Bern.
