= Renée Schwarzenbach-Wille =

Swiss socialite (1883–1959)

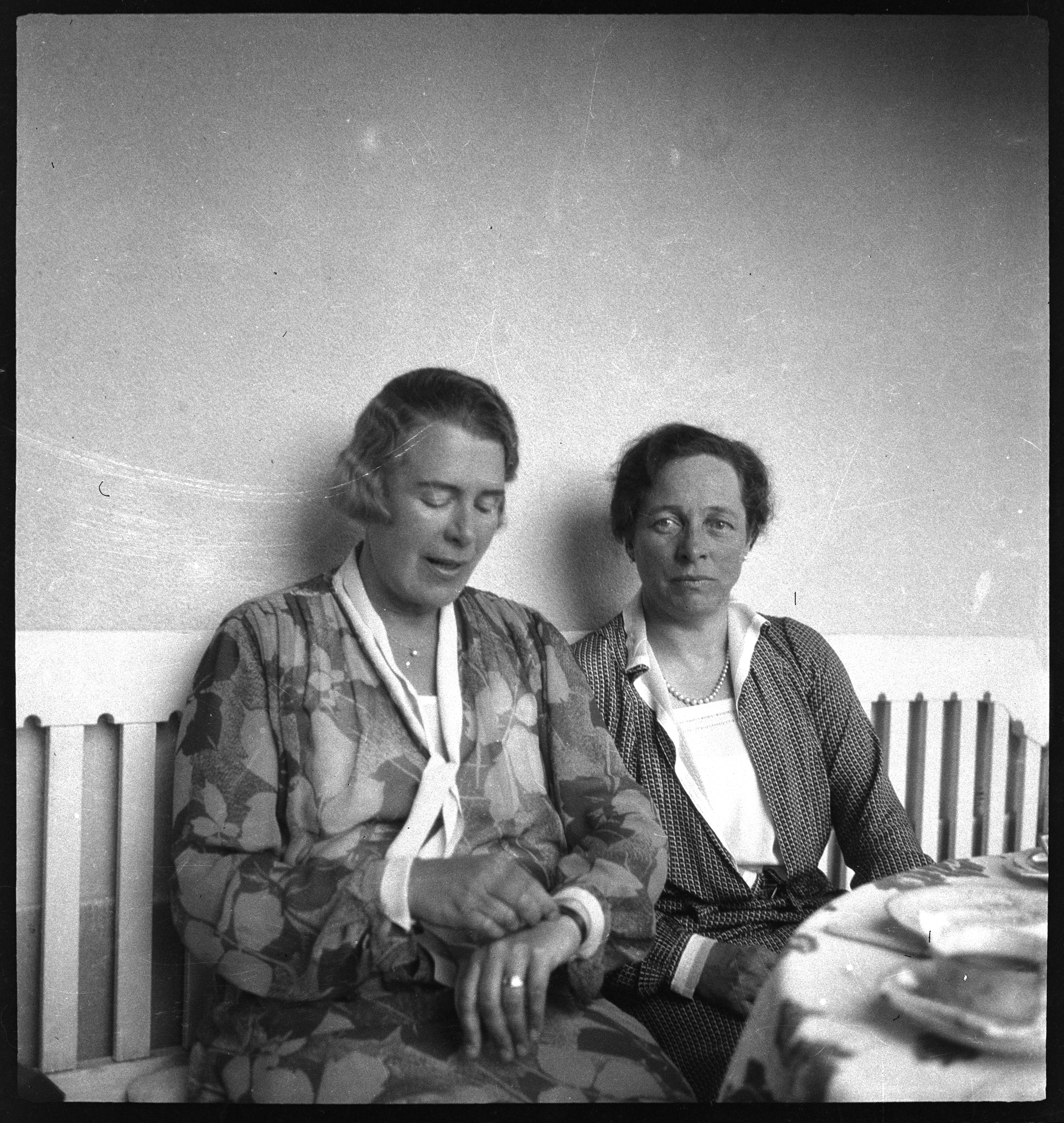
- Schwarzenbach (right) with Emmy Krüger
- Born: Marie Renée Wille; 4 September 1883; Thun, Switzerland
- Died: 26 April 1959 (aged 75); Konstanz, West Germany
- Occupations: Socialite, photographer, horse breeder, equestrian
- Spouse: Alfred Schwarzenbach (m. 1904; died 1940)
- Children: 5, including Annemarie
- Relatives: Alexis Schwarzenbach (great-great-grandson)
- Family: Schwarzenbach family

Marie Renée Schwarzenbach colloquially Renée Schwarzenbach-Wille (née Wille; 4 September 1883 – 26 April 1959) was a Swiss socialite, photographer, horse breeder and equestrian who was most notably known for being associated with the Schwarzenbach family.

== Early life and education ==
Schwarzenbach was born Marie Renée Wille on 4 September 1883 in Thun, Switzerland, the youngest of five children, to Ulrich Wille, the Swiss General during World War I, and Clara von Bismarck (1851–1946). Her siblings were; Friedrich Wille (1874–1912), Ulrich "Ully" Wille Jr. (1877–1959), Arnold Wille (1878–1968) and Amalie von Erlach (née Wille; 1882–1958).

Her father was born into a German merchant family of Swiss origin. His paternal ancestors originally emigrated from La Sagne in Romandy to Zweibrücken in Rhineland-Palatinate in the 18th century, with the original spelling of the family name being Vuille. Her maternal grandfather was Count Friedrich Wilhelm von Bismarck.

== Life ==
Her father was head of the Swiss army during World War I. In 1904 she married Alfred Schwarzenbach, a wealthy businessman in the silk industry. They had five children. She had affairs with women and was likely bisexual, which her husband tolerated.

She was a passionate horsewoman, photographer (which she first became interested in at the age of 14) and music-lover – in particular of Wagner. After her marriage she chronicled the family life on their Bocken Estate in Horgen near Lake Zürich in a detailed photographic diary. At her death she had filled 64 photo-albums, containing approx. 10,000 photos in total.

Schwarzenbach was an equestrian sportswoman competing in main show jumping events in Switzerland and Germany, including the 1936 Summer Olympics in Berlin

== Personal life ==
In 1904, Renée Wille married Dr. Alfred Schwarzenbach (1876–1940), who was then a majority owner and president of Robert Schwarzenbach & Co, one of the largest silk mills. They had five children;

- Robert Ulrich Schwarzenbach (1904–1973), who was born deaf-mute, never married and without issue.
- Suzanne Amalie Schwarzenbach (1906–1999), married firstly to Swedish-born diplomat Torgny Eric Oehman and secondly to Ernst Zuppiger (1903–1966), had one daughter.
- Annemarie Schwarzenbach (1908–1942), married Achille-Claude Clarac, without issue.
- Alfred "Freddy" Schwarzenbach (1911–1998), married to Italian-born Itala Bianchi (1910–2002), two daughters.
- Hans Robert "Hasi" Schwarzenbach (1913–1993), married to Swiss American Adrienne Veillon (1915–2002), had two sons, including Alfred Schwarzenbach and François Schwarzenbach. Alexis Schwarzenbach is his grandson.

The family resided at Bocken Estate in Horgen, Switzerland.

Although she devoted herself to her husband and family she also had a long-term affair with the German opera singer Emmy Krüger.

Renée held political sympathies towards Germany, whether the Kaiser, Hitler or Adenauer was in power. During her many stays in Munich with her mistress, she saw the rise of Nazism as a way of overcoming the humiliating Treaty of Versailles. German diplomats in Switzerland praised her loyalty to the Nazi cause in their reports. After World War II, she helped out those Germans who had fled to Switzerland to escape the Allies.

She is known for her dominating personality and had a difficult relationship with her second daughter Annemarie, writer, photographer and traveller. This was partly due to the political differences between the two women: Renée being pro-German throughout the Nazi period and Annemarie holding decidedly anti-fascist views.

== Bibliography ==
- Bilder mit Legenden. Ed. Alexis Schwarzenbach (Scheidegger & Spiess Zürich, 2001, ISBN 3-85881-169-6)
