= Abalakov =

Abalakov is a surname. Notable people with the surname include:

- Alexander Abalakov (born 1959), Russian politician
- Vitaly Abalakov (1906–1986), Soviet mountaineer
- Yevgeniy Abalakov (1907–1948), Soviet mountaineer, brother of Vitaly

== See also ==
- Abalakov thread, an ice protection device named after Vitaly Abalakov
