= Alexis Schwarzenbach =

Swiss historian (born 1971)

- Born: Alexis Caspar Schwarzenbach; 1971 (age 54–55); Zürich, Switzerland
- Education: Freies Gymnasium Zürich
- Alma mater: Balliol College (AB); European University Institute (PhD)
- Occupations: Historian; curator; author
- Relatives: Annemarie Schwarzenbach (great-aunt); Renée Schwarzenbach-Wille (great-great-grandmother); Ulrich Wille (3x great-grandfather); Robert Miles Sloman (5x great-grandfather)
- Family: Schwarzenbach family
- Website: Official website

Alexis Caspar Schwarzenbach (German pronunciation: [ˈʃvaʁtsn̩baχ]; born 1971) is a Swiss historian, curator and author. He is a member of the prominent Schwarzenbach family.

== Early life and education ==
Schwarzenbach was born in 1971 in Zürich, Switzerland, to François Schwarzenbach (b. 1939) and Sybille Schwarzenbach (née Sigg). His father is a businessman and heir to Robert Schwarzenbach & Co, formerly the world's largest silk concern. He has two younger sisters and a brother.

He is a great-nephew of Annemarie Schwarzenbach and a great-great-grandson of Renée Schwarzenbach-Wille. Hence he is also of patrilineal descent of Ulrich Wille and Robert Miles Sloman. He is only very distantly related to Urs Schwarzenbach, proprietor of the Dolder Grand Hotel. He has Swiss, German and English ancestry.

In 1990, Schwarzenbach completed his Matura, at Freies Gymnasium Zürich and studied Modern History at Balliol College, Oxford completing a Bachelor of Arts in 1994. He received his PhD in 1997 from European University Institute.

== Career ==
Between 1998 and 2000, Schwarzenbach worked as literary editor at Scalo Publishers, from 2000 to 2004 as Research fellow in Oxford, Rome and Essen. From 2004 to 2009, he engaged in independent work as author and curator. From 2009 to 2011 he was a curator at the Swiss National Museum. In 2012 he became a docent and later professor at the Lucerne University of Applied Sciences and Arts.

In 2021, he founded a studio for history, primarily engaging in research and book projects. Notable projects include the curation of the Stehli Silks archives. He is currently also a board member of Robert Schwarzenbach & Co, which today is primarily active in real estate management and he concurrently is vice president of the Zurich Silk Society (which is a union of former and current silk manufacturing and merchant companies).

== Literature ==
=== Author ===
- Emil Schulthess: Fotografien 1950–1990. Limmat, Zürich 2013, ISBN 978-3-85791-709-7.
- Königliche Träume. Eine Kulturgeschichte der Monarchie von 1789 bis 1997. Collection Rolf Heyne, München 2012, ISBN 978-3-89910-459-2.
- WWF – Die Biografie. Collection Rolf Heyne, München 2011, ISBN 978-3-89910-491-2.
- Auf der Schwelle des Fremden. Das Leben der Annemarie Schwarzenbach. Collection Rolf Heyne, München 2008, ISBN 978-3-89910-368-7.
- Das verschmähte Genie. Albert Einstein und die Schweiz. DVA, München 2005, ISBN 3-421-05853-9.
- «Die Geborene» – Renée Schwarzenbach-Wille und ihre Familie. Scheidegger & Spiess, Zürich 2004, ISBN 3-85881-161-0.

=== Publisher ===
- Annemarie Schwarzenbach: Eine Frau zu sehen. Kein & Aber, Zürich 2008, ISBN 978-3-0369-5523-0 (Erstdruck aus dem Nachlass).
- Liebeserklärungen einer Reisenden, Feuilletons von Annemarie Schwarzenbach, 1933–1942. Kein & Aber, Zürich 2007, ISBN 3-0369-1192-8 (Hörbuch gelesen von Bibiana Beglau).
- Renée Schwarzenbach-Wille: Bilder mit Legenden. Scheidegger & Spiess, Zürich 2005, ISBN 3-85881-169-6 (Fotoband).
- Mit Jeff Rosenheim: Unclassified: A Walker Evans Anthology. The Metropolitan Museum of Art, New York & Scalo, Zürich, ISBN 3-908247-21-7.
