= Alfred Schwarzenbach =

Alfred Schwarzenbach may refer to:

- Alfred Schwarzenbach (equestrian) (born 1941), Swiss equestrian
- Alfred Schwarzenbach Sr. (1876–1940), his grandfather, Swiss industrialist, equestrian, philanthropist and politician
