= Robert Schwarzenbach Jr. =

Swiss-born American businessman and diplomat

Consul Robert Schwarzenbach Jr.

Consul General of Switzerland to New York City
- In office 1926 – 1929 (his death)
- President: Heinrich Haeberlin
- Preceded by: Louis Henri Junod
- Succeeded by: Victor Nef

Personal details
- Born: Hans Friedrich Robert Schwarzenbach; November 10, 1875 Zurich, Switzerland
- Died: August 3, 1929 (aged 53) Hicksville, New York, U.S.
- Citizenship: Switzerland; United States (since 1917)
- Spouse: Hedwig Margaritha Froelicher (m. 1913)
- Relations: Alfred Schwarzenbach Sr. (brother); Sibyl Schwarzenbach (granddaughter)
- Occupation: Businessman, diplomat

Robert John Frederick "Roby" Schwarzenbach (November 10, 1875 – August 3, 1929) was a Swiss-born American businessman and diplomat who served as Honorary Consul of Switzerland to New York City.

He served as president of Schwarzenbach Enterprises and as president of the Swiss Benevolent Society from 1911 to 1924.

== Personal life ==
In 1913, Schwarzenbach married Hedwig Margaritha Froelicher (1889–1972), a daughter of Maximilian J. Froelicher (1851–1913) and Margaretha Emerentia Froelicher (née Stehli; 1864–1955), of the Stehli family. Hedwig and her parents survived the sinking of the Titanic. They had three children:

- Anne Liselotte Schwarzenbach (1913–1981), married to Johann Georg "Gög" Sulzer (1909–2001), an industrialist and last family president of Sulzer, with issue.
- Robert Maximilian Schwarzenbach III (1917–1988), married Brigitte Lowe, had a son, Robert Schwarzenbach IV (1943–1962).
- Jean Christophe "Chris" Schwarzenbach (1918–2017), married firstly Katherine Margaret Loughran (1923–1957), with whom he had four children, married secondly to Katharine Tilt "Katie" Nevins (1922–2020), with whom he had two children.

Schwarzenbach died on August 3, 1929, at his Manneto Hill Farm in Plainview, Long Island, aged 53.

After his death his family relocated to Wilson Point in Norwalk, Connecticut.
