= Cynthia Harrison =

American historian

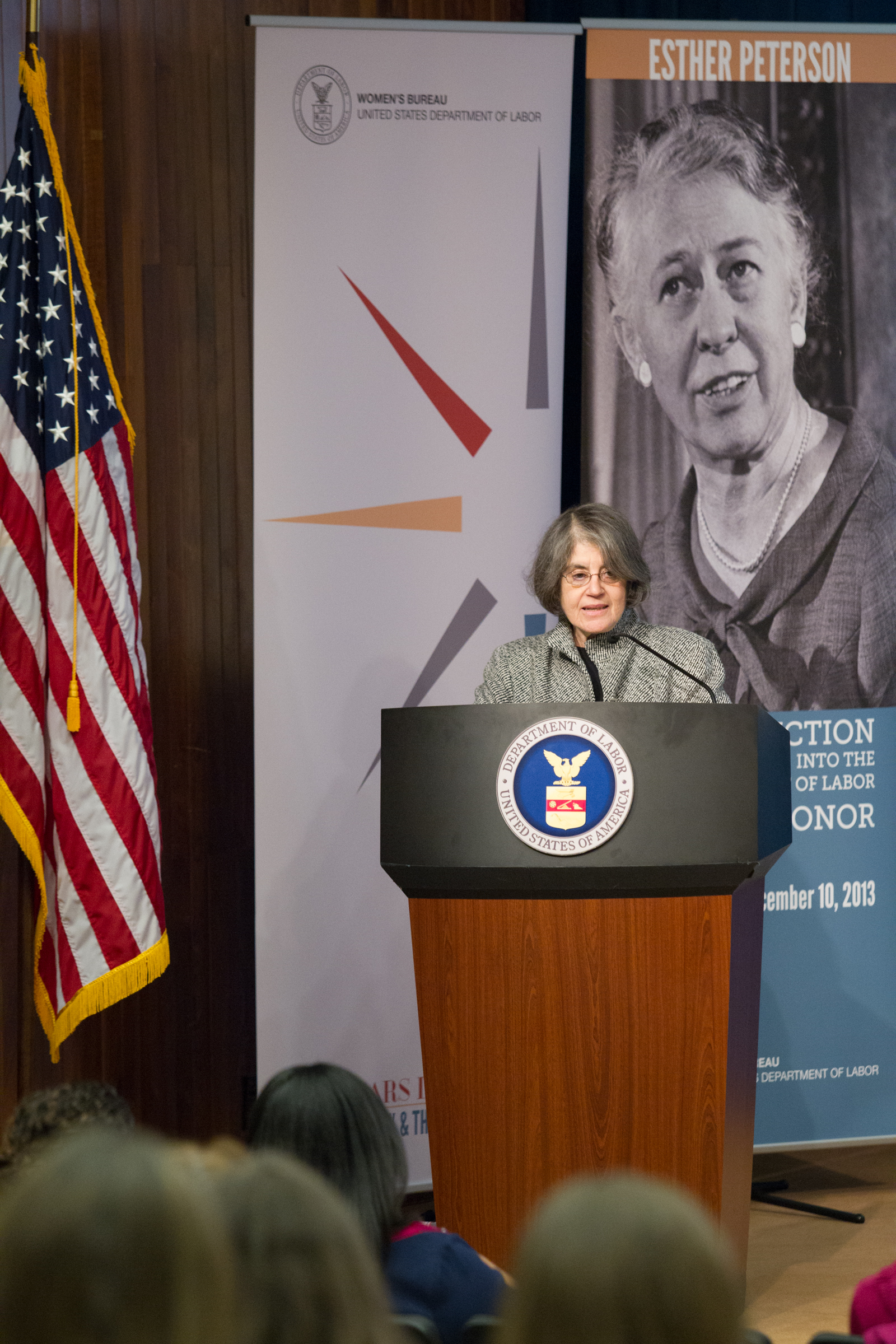
Cynthia Harrison of George Washington University presents a video about the creation of the President's Commission on the Status of Women.

Cynthia Ellen Harrison (born October 1946) is a historian who taught at George Washington University. Harrison participated in activism that led to the Equal Credit Act of 1974 and is an advocate for gender equality.

== Early life ==
Cynthia Ellen Harrison was born in October 1946 in Brooklyn, New York. She grew up and attended public schools in Brooklyn, New York. Her parents names were Herbert Harrison and Jean Hacken Harrison. Harrison was married 1970 and divorced in 1984. After, she had a long-term relationship with another man. Harrison has no children. She became an activist feminist in 1970, when she moved to Canada. She has lived in Washington, D.C., since 1975.

== Education ==
Harrison received her bachelor's degree (B.A.) in June 1966 at Brooklyn College, Brooklyn, N.Y. Her degree she graduated with was in American literature. She went on to get her master's degree (M.S.) in library service. She achieved this in August 1967 at Columbia University, New York N.Y. Harrison received her doctorate degree (PhD) in American history in May 1982. This degree was at Columbia University as well.

== Career ==
Harrison's first job from September 1967 to July 1970 was working for the Brooklyn Public Library in a library in Brooklyn, New York, initially the "Rugby Branch" and a year later in the "telephone reference division." Then, from September 1970 to May 1972, Harrison was an Assistant Head Librarian in the reference department at McMaster University Library, Ontario, Canada.

She was an instructor at Columbia University in New York, N.Y. In the summer of 1976, she led the "Eurocentre program". In the summer of 1977 she led an American history survey on pre-Civil War. Harrison was a research fellow at The Brookings Institution from August 1979 until August 1982. Harrison was in the American Historical Association/American Political Science Association. She was a deputy director in Project '87 from August 1982 to April 1988.

At the Federal Judicial Center in Washington, D.C., Harrison was chief of Federal Judicial History Office from April 1988 to December 1994. Her special projects include; Supreme Court Justices' oral history interviews and Gender Issues Coordinator; liaison with courts and allied organizations concerning programs on gender fairness education.

In 1994 to 1996, Harrison was a part of the Columbian School Student Appeals Committee. From 1996 to 1999, she was part of the By-laws Committee. In 1998 she was in the CSAS Hiring Oversight Committee. Harrison was in the CSAS Dean's Council from 1998 to 2001. Harrison was a part of the GWIPP Steering Committee from 1998 to 2003. In 2001 to 2003 she was in the Faculty Senate Committee on Professional Ethics and Academic Freedom.

She was chair in the EMMA/NWPC awards committee in 2003. From 2003 to 2004, Harrison was in the MPP Program Committee. From 2003 to 2005 she was on the committee on the Status of Women Faculty and Librarians. In 2005 she was part of CCAS Committee on Graduate Studies.

Harrison taught for many years at George Washington University. She is currently emeritus faculty, which labels her as retired. The classes that she taught were; "Women in the United States: 1865 to Present", "U.S. Constitutional History", and "Readings on Women in American History". Her teaching field also includes; "U.S. women’s history; U.S. Constitutional history; women and public policy; women and the law; women and welfare policy". While working at the George Washington University she had many professional experiences. Along with all of the classes she taught at George Washington University in Washington, D.C., she was also a GW/IWPR Fellowship coordinator. "She also served for three terms on the DC Commission for Women"

== Activism ==
She played a role in the Equal Credit Act of 1974. The law was enacted the 28th of October 1974. The law "made it unlawful for any creditor to discriminate against any applicant, with respect to any aspect of a credit transaction, on the basis of race, color, religion, national origin, sex, marital status, or age (provided the applicant has the capacity to contract); to the fact that all or part of the applicant's income derives from a public assistance program; or to the fact that the applicant has in good faith exercised any right under the Consumer Credit Protection Act".

=== Equal Credit Act ===
Harrison was employed full time and her husband, at the time, was a full time graduate student. During this time, credit card companies would routinely deny single women the ability to have a credit card. Men needed to be cosigners for the married women to gain access to a credit card. So, she had to fight with banks and stores to credit her own name. Harrison had been denied many times for credit cards until she applied under the name of "C. Harrison", which then she was granted a credit card. The reason she was able to gain access to a credit card is because the name she applied under wasn't believed to be a woman's name. The Equal Credit Opportunity Act of 1974 helped change that problem of women being discriminated against. "The ECOA sought to address practices that made it difficult for women, particularly married and formerly married women, to obtain credit."

=== Welfare reform ===
In 1996, Bill Clinton made a program that supported poor families, Aid to Families with Dependent Children. Harrison and a large group of feminists formed an organization they called the "Women's Committee of 100." The organization they created advocated enhancing, not destroying, the program that was made. The program is now called "Temporary Assistance to Needy Families" and it removes federal oversight of state programs designed to help poor children and their caregivers. Harrison tried to raise a dissenting voice to this program.

== Professional associations ==
Harrison was a part of these associations;

- American Historical Association
- Organization of American Historians
- American Political Science Association
- Coordinating Council for Women in History

== Works published ==
Harrison wrote a book of her own called "On Account of Sex: The Politics of Women's Issues, 1945-1968." In this book she goes into depth about the political activities between the mid-1940s and mid-1960s. The time frame fell when the women gained the vote to when the women's movement was brought back. This book highlights women's history and their journey.

She also had reference works called "Women's Movement Media; A Source Guide", published in 1975, and "Women in American History", which was published in 1979.

Harrison helped publish 17 articles about a variety of topics in Women's History. Those articles are;

- "Creating a National Feminist Agenda: The Women’s Action Alliance and Feminist Coalition Building in the 1970s", forthcoming in Stephanie Gilmore, ed., Feminist Coalitions: Historical Perspectives on Second-Wave Feminism in the United States, University of Illinois Press, 2006.
- "The Papers of the President’s Commission on the Status of Women" – introduction to the microfilm edition, University Press of America, 2003.
- “ 'Heightened Scrutiny': An Alternative Route to Constitutional Equality for U.S. Women", in Women and the U.S. Constitution: History, Interpretation, and Practice by Sibyl A. Schwarzenbach and Patricia Smith, eds., New York: Columbia University Press, 2003, pp. 347–364 (an abridgement of "Constitutional Equality for Women", published in 2002).
- “ 'Heightened Scrutiny': A Judicial Route to Constitutional Equality for U.S. Women", in Alexandra Dobrowolsky and Vivien Hart, eds., Women Making Constitutions: New Politics and Comparative Perspectives. Hampshire, England & New York: Palgrave Macmillan, 2003, pp. 155–172 (an abridgement of "Constitutional Equality for Women", published in 2002).
- “ 'A Revolution But Half Accomplished': The Twentieth Century's Engagement with Child-Raising, Women's Work, and Feminism", in William H. Chafe, ed., The Achievement of American Liberalism: The New Deal and Its Legacies. New York: Columbia University Press, 2003, pp. 243–274.
- "Constitutional Equality for Women: Losing the Battle/Winning the War", in Sandra VanBurkleo et al., eds. Constitutionalism and American Culture: Writing the New Constitutional History. Lawrence: University of Kansas Press, 2002, pp. 174–210.
- "A New Women’s Movement: The Emergence of the National Organization for Women", in Thomas Dublin & Kathryn Kish Sklar, eds., Women and Power in American History, 2nd ed., Prentice-Hall, 2002, pp. 227–239.
- "Women, Gender, Values, and Public Policy," in Milton M. Carrow, Robert Paul Churchill, and Joseph J. Cordes, eds., Democracy, Social Values, and Public Policy (Westport, Conn.: Praeger, 1998), pp. 147–161.
- "The Changing Status of American Women," for the USIA electronic journal on U.S. Social Policy, published on its website. May 28, 1997.
- General introduction to Women in American Politics: Manuscript Collections, University Publications of America, 1992.
- Chapter on American women since World War II contributed to US History Since World War II by Joel Hodson et al., part of the USIA series, An American Portrait, 1992.
- "Presidential Appointments and Policy-Making Women", Third Women's Policy Research Conference Proceedings, Institute for Women's Policy Research, May 15–16, 1992.
- "A Richer Life: A Reflection on the Women's Movement." In The American Woman, 1988–89, ed. Review, September 1989; American Historical Review, October 1989; The Historian, November 1989; American Journal of Sociology, November 1989; Reviews in American History, December 1989; Feminist Studies, Spring, 1991; Journal of American History, September 1991; Women and Politics, V.11, no. 3 (1991). Revised June 4, 2019, 4 Sara E. Rix. Women's Research & Education Institute of the Congressional Caucus for Women's Issues. New York: W.W. Norton & Company, 1988.
- "Stalemate: Federal Legislation for Women in the Truman Era." In Harry S. Truman: The Man from Independence, ed. William F. Levantrosser, 217–232. Westport, Conn.: Greenwood Press, 1986.
- "Politics and Law." In The Women's Annual, Number 4, 1983–1984, ed. Sarah M. Pritchard, 145–166. Boston: G.K. Hall, 1984.
- "The Prohibition Experience." The Abortion Dispute and the American System, ed. Gilbert Y. Steiner, 95–103. Washington, D.C.: The Brookings Institution, 1983.
- "A 'New Frontier' for Women: The Public Policy of the Kennedy Administration," Journal of American History 67 (December 1980): 630–646.
