= Emmy Krüger =

German operatic soprano

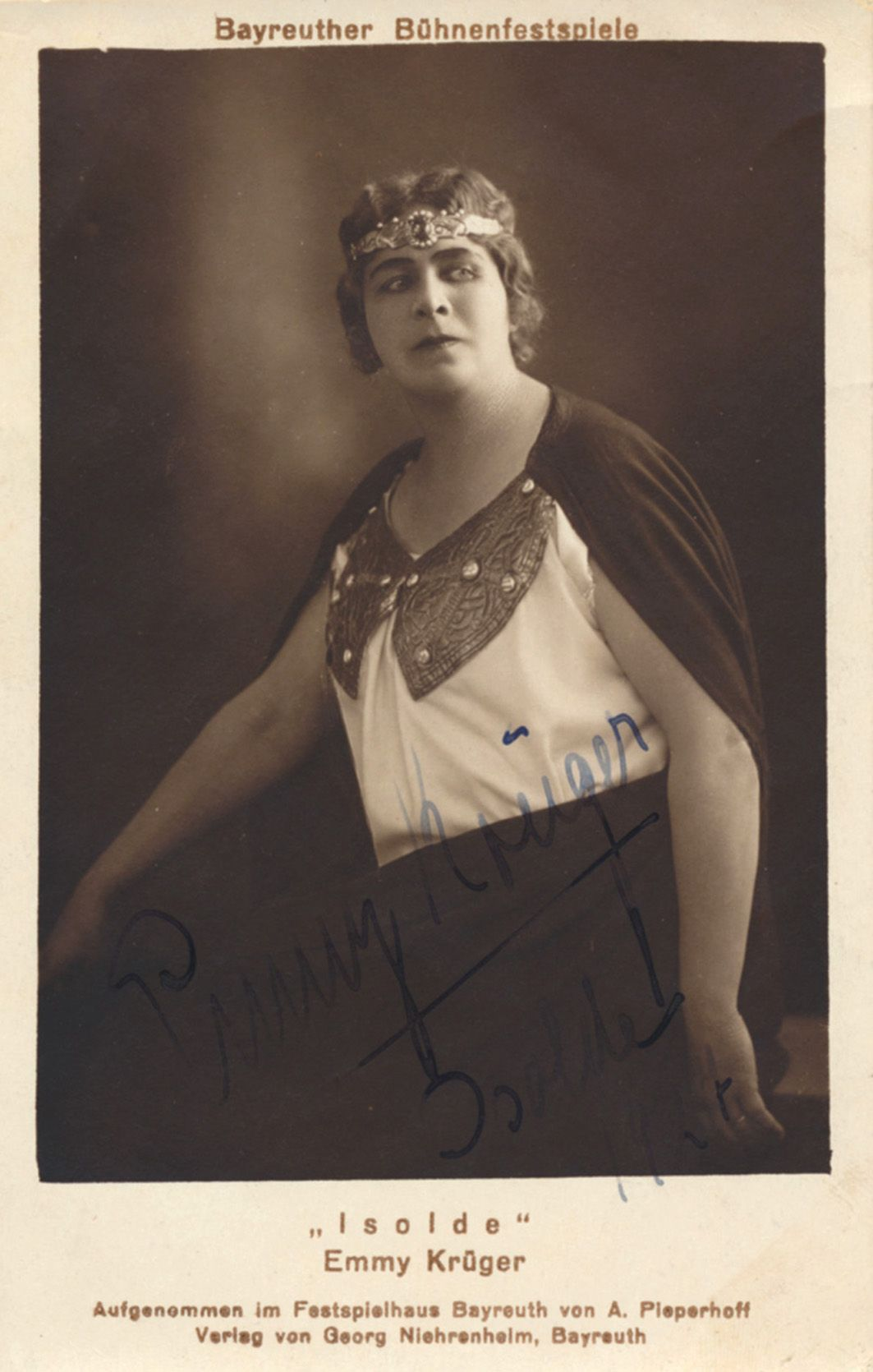
Emmy Krüger (Isolde, 1927)

Emmy Krüger (27 November 1886 – 13 March 1976) was a German operatic dramatic soprano.

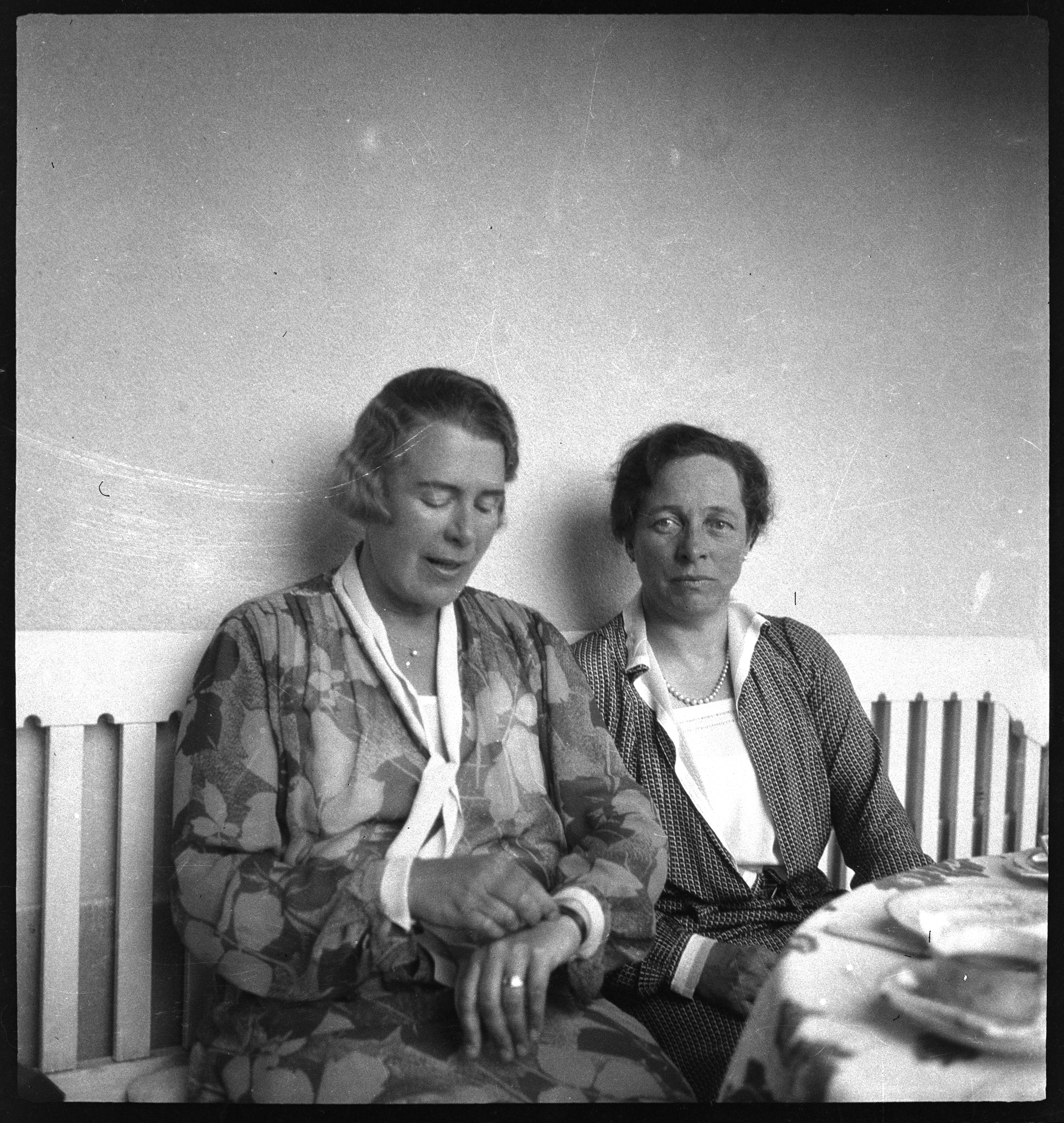
Emmy Krüger (left) and Renée Schwarzenbach-Wille, 1933 Photo Annemarie Schwarzenbach

Krüger was born in Frankfurt am Main. She notably portrayed the title role in the world première of Erich Wolfgang Korngold's Violanta at the National Theatre Munich in 1916. In 1917, she created the role of Silla in the première of Hans Pfitzner's Palestrina at the Prinzregententheater. Occasionally she sang mezzo-soprano parts such as Octavian in Richard Strauss's Der Rosenkavalier, which she has sung as early as 1911 in Zürich and again in 1918 under the composer's baton. She was a regular performer at the Bayreuth Festival during the 1920s and 1930s where her most frequently assailed role was that of Isolde in Richard Wagner's Tristan und Isolde. She had a long-time romantic relationship with Swiss millionaire's wife, Olympic equestrian sportswoman and amateur photographer Renée Schwarzenbach-Wille, who was the mother of writer Annemarie Schwarzenbach. She died, aged 89, in Zurich.
