= Bocken Estate =

Country house in Horgen, Switzerland

Coordinates: 47°14′35″N 8°36′46″E

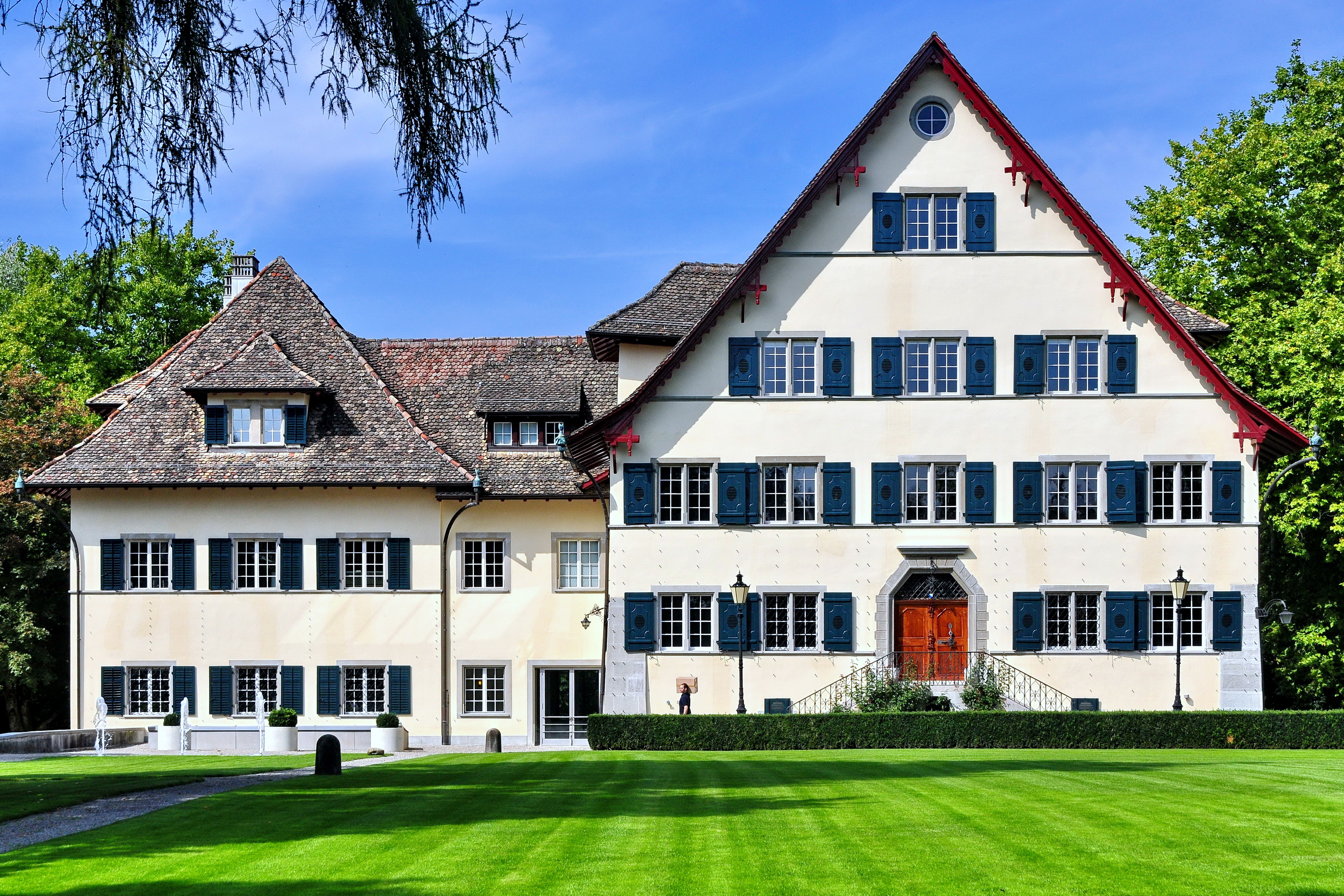
Main building

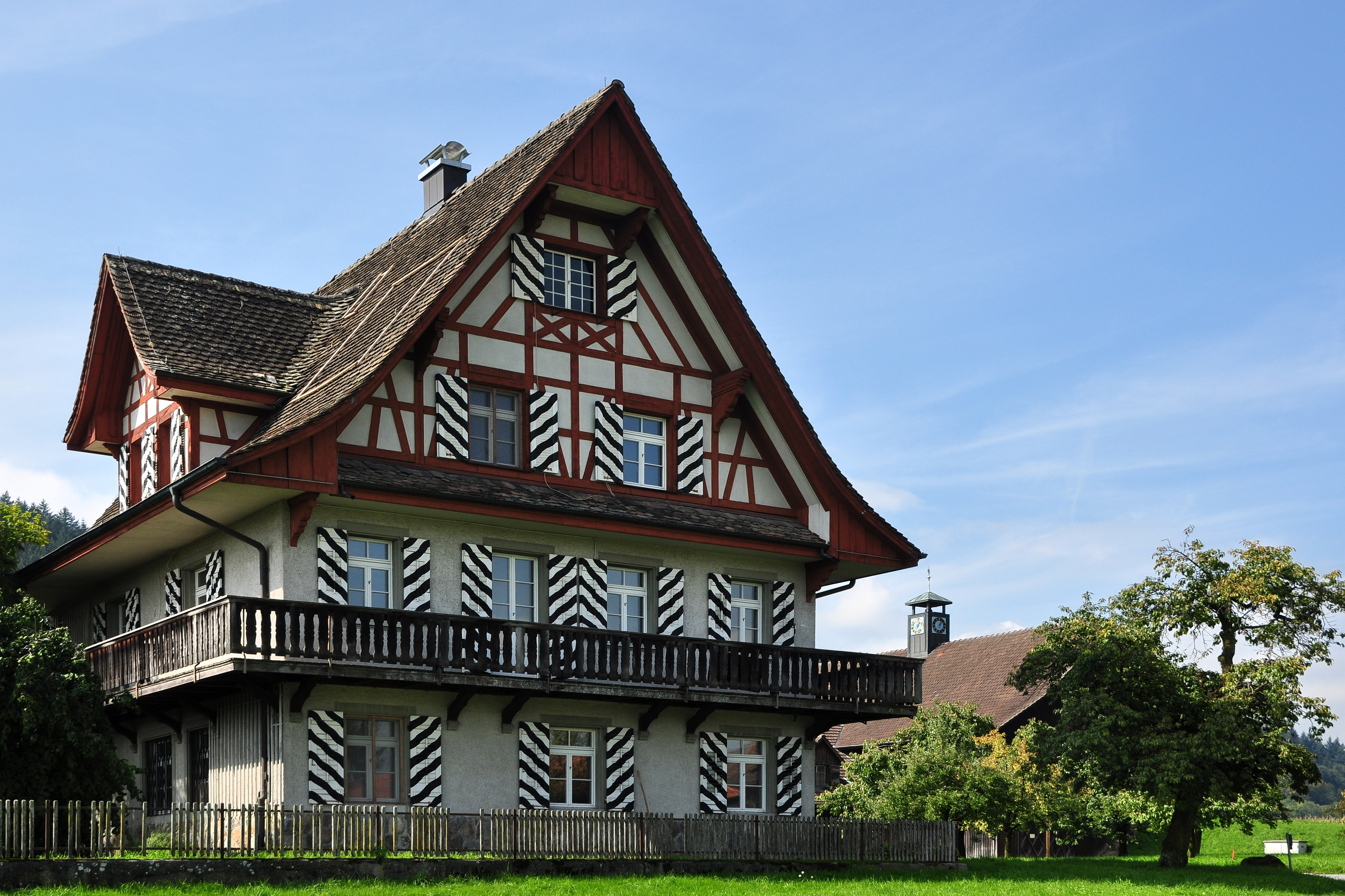
A building on the estate

Bocken Estate (German: Landgut Bocken) is a country estate in the municipality of Horgen of the Swiss canton of Zurich. It is a Swiss heritage site of national significance.

From 1912 on Alfred Emil Schwarzenbach, a wealthy businessman in the silk industry and his wife Renée Schwarzenbach-Wille, horsewoman and amateur photographer, lived here with their family of five children. One of their daughters, novelist, travel journalist and photographer Annemarie Schwarzenbach grew up on the estate.
