= Achille-Claude Clarac =

French diplomat and writer

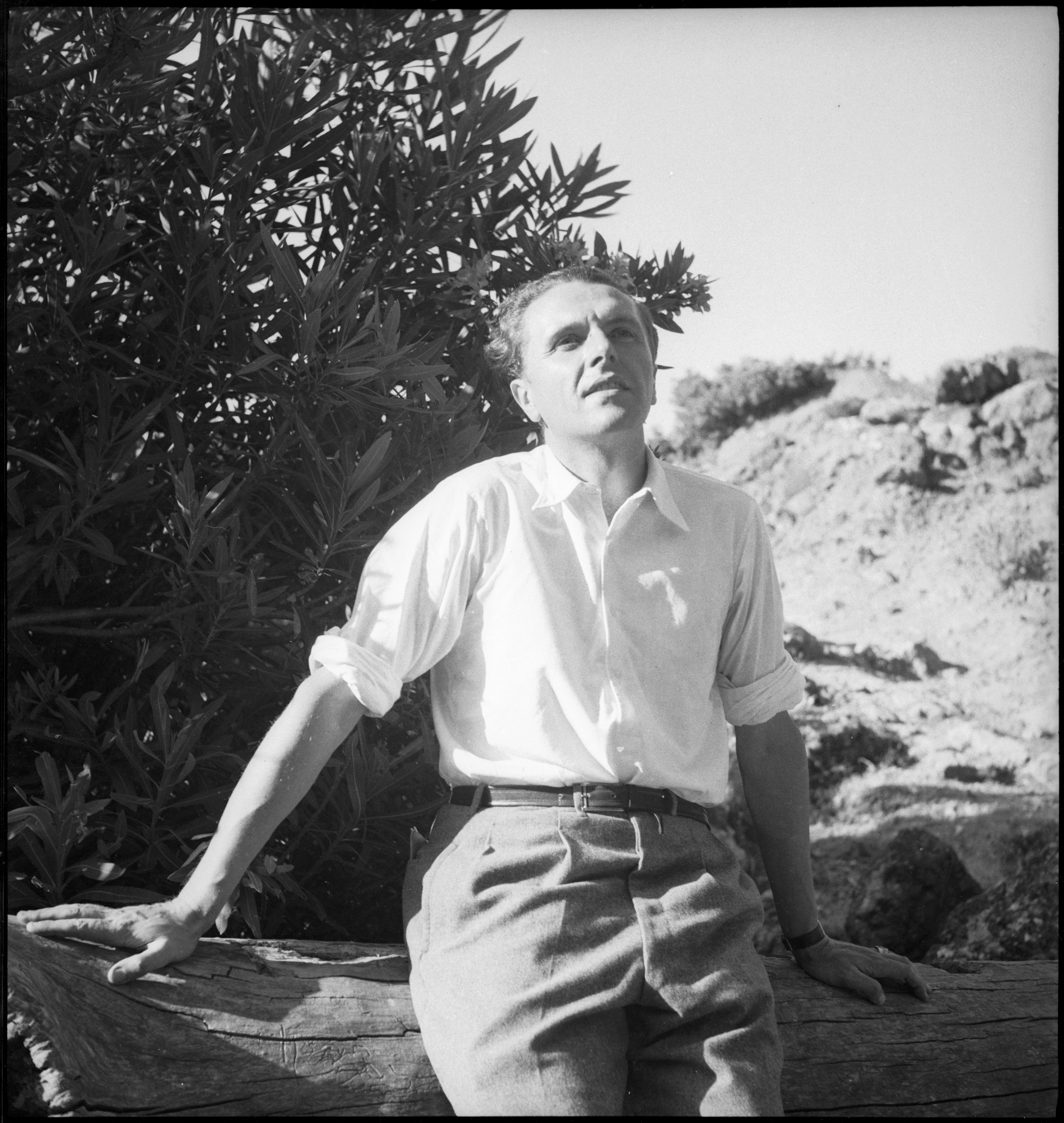
Claude Clarac by Annemarie Schwarzenbach

Achille Claude Clarac, also known as Claude Clarac (31 August 1903 - 11 January 1999) was a French diplomat and writer.

== Early life and education ==
Achille Claude Clarac was born on 31 August 1903 in Nantes, France. He studied law and entered the foreign service in 1930.

== Career ==
In 1934 he became embassy secretary in Tehran, where he married, in May 1935, the Swiss writer and photojournalist Annemarie Schwarzenbach (1908–1942). He was Consul of France in Tehran until 1942.

He was made "Chevalier" de la Légion d'honneur in 1946 and promoted to "Officier" in 1953. From 31 March 1955 to 2 November 1956 he was French ambassador to Syria in Damascus. From 1959 to 1968 he was French ambassador in Thailand in Bangkok.

== Personal life ==
According to Schwarzenbach's biographers, Clarac was gay and theirs was a marriage of convenience for both of them; to Schwarzenbach, who was lesbian, obtaining a French diplomatic passport enabled her to travel without restrictions. They were friends and when Schwarzenbach sustained a serious head injury and was dying, Clarac rushed from Tehran to her deathbed in Engadin, but Schwarzenbach's mother, Renée Schwarzenbach-Wille, forbade everyone to see her daughter.

Clarac adopted one son, Henri Pageau-Clarac.

Claude Clarac died on 11 January 1999.

== Works ==
In 1971, with Michael Smithies, he wrote Discovering Thailand, published with Siam Publications. In 1973, under the pen-name of Saint Ours he wrote the gay collection of 7 stories, Un ange à Sodome (An Angel in Sodom), with the publisher Guy Authier.
