= Sibyl Schwarzenbach =

American philosopher

Education
- Education: Harvard University (PhD)

Philosophical work
- Era: 21st-century philosophy
- Region: Western philosophy
- Institutions: CUNY Graduate Center
- Main interests: ethics, political philosophy

Sibyl Schwarzenbach is an American philosopher and Professor Emerita of Philosophy at the Graduate Center of the City University of New York. She is known for her works on ethics and political philosophy. She is a granddaughter of Robert Schwarzenbach Jr.

== Books ==
- America Through Foreign Eyes: The U.S. Photojournalism of Annemarie Schwarzenbach (1936-1941), Palgrave Macmillan, 2026
- On Civic Friendship: Including Women in the State, Columbia University Press, 2009
- Women and the U.S. Constitution: History, Interpretation, and Practice, with Patricia Smith, Columbia University Press, 2003
