= Robert Steiner (writer) =

German mountain climber

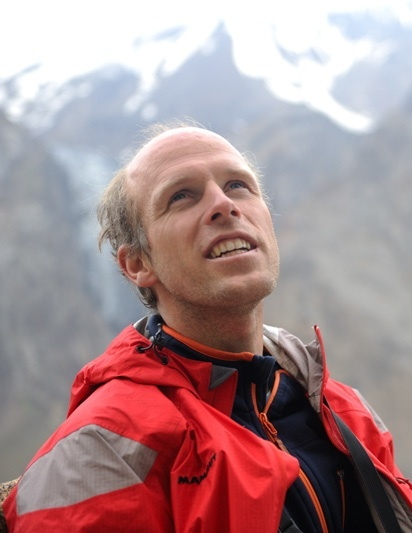
Robert Steiner

Robert Steiner (born 7 December 1976), is a German high school teacher, mountain climber and writer.

Steiner was born in Stuttgart, Germany, and grew up in Ostelsheim in the Black Forest. After finishing his Abitur he studied Geography and German in Freiburg im Breisgau to become a teacher.

Steiner started mountain-climbing at the age of 17 and went on to climb the Eiger, Matterhorn and Grandes Jorasses. He then climbed Bigwall in British Columbia and took part in expeditions to Mount Everest, Langtang in Tibet, Rolwaling and Tien Shan. In 1997 he had a serious accident while climbing the north face of the Grandes Jorasses in the Alps, during which he fell 50 meters, suffered from a shattered knee and broken bones, and was forced to hang on a rope for two days in minus 20 degrees Celsius temperatures. The accident made him review his attitude to climbing, after which he wrote his first book.

In 2016, Steiner completed the ascent of the same mountain face which nearly cost him his life nine years earlier. This feat was made into a documentary.

== Works ==
- Selig, wer in Träumen stirbt, 2002
- Stoneman, Panico Alpinverlag 2004
- Tod am Khan Tengri, Lorenz Saladin, Expeditionsbergsteiger und Fotograf, with Emil Zopfi. AS Verlag, Zürich 2009. ISBN 3909111637.
- Allein unter Russen, Panico Alpinverlag 2010, ISBN 978-3-936740-74-5
