= Yevgeniy Abalakov =

Soviet mountaineer and sculptor (1907–1948)

- Евгений Абалаков
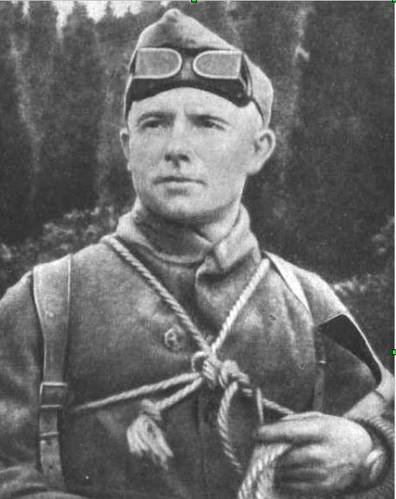
- Yevgeniy Abalakov in 1941
- Born: February 17 [O.S. 4], 1907; Yeniseysk, Yeniseysk Governorate, Russian Empire
- Died: March 23, 1948 (aged 41); Moscow, Soviet Union
- Burial place: Novodevichy Cemetery in Moscow
- Occupations: Mountaineer, sculptor

Yevgeniy Mikhaylovich Abalakov (Russian: Евге́ний Миха́йлович Абала́ков; 17 February [O.S. 4 February] 1907 – 23 March 1948) was a Soviet mountaineer and sculptor.

Abalakov was born in Yeniseysk. He is noted for making the first ascent of the highest point of the Soviet Union – the 7,495-meter Stalin Peak (later renamed Communism Peak and eventually Ismoil Somoni Peak, its current name) on 3 September 1933 as a member of the 29th detachment of the Tajik-Pamir Sovnarkom expedition. At the beginning of the German-Soviet War, a theatre of World War II, Abalakov went to the front. Abalakov died on 23 March, 1948 in Moscow, in obscure circumstances, while preparing for the ascent to the Victory Peak. His brother, Vitaly Abalakov, also a famous mountaineer, was credited with many climbing equipment innovations and inventions, including Abalakov thread (or V-thread).

Abalakov was buried at Novodevichy Cemetery in Moscow.

== Bibliography ==
- (in Russian) Анатолий Ферапонтов. Восходители. Евгений Абалаков.
- (in Russian) Алексей Абалаков. Тайна гибели Евгения Абалакова – непрочитанные страницы истории Москва, МАКС Пресс 2000. г. in .pdf format
- (in Russian) Расстрельное время
