= Abalakov thread =

Ice climbing loop knot directly passing through a hole drilled across the ice

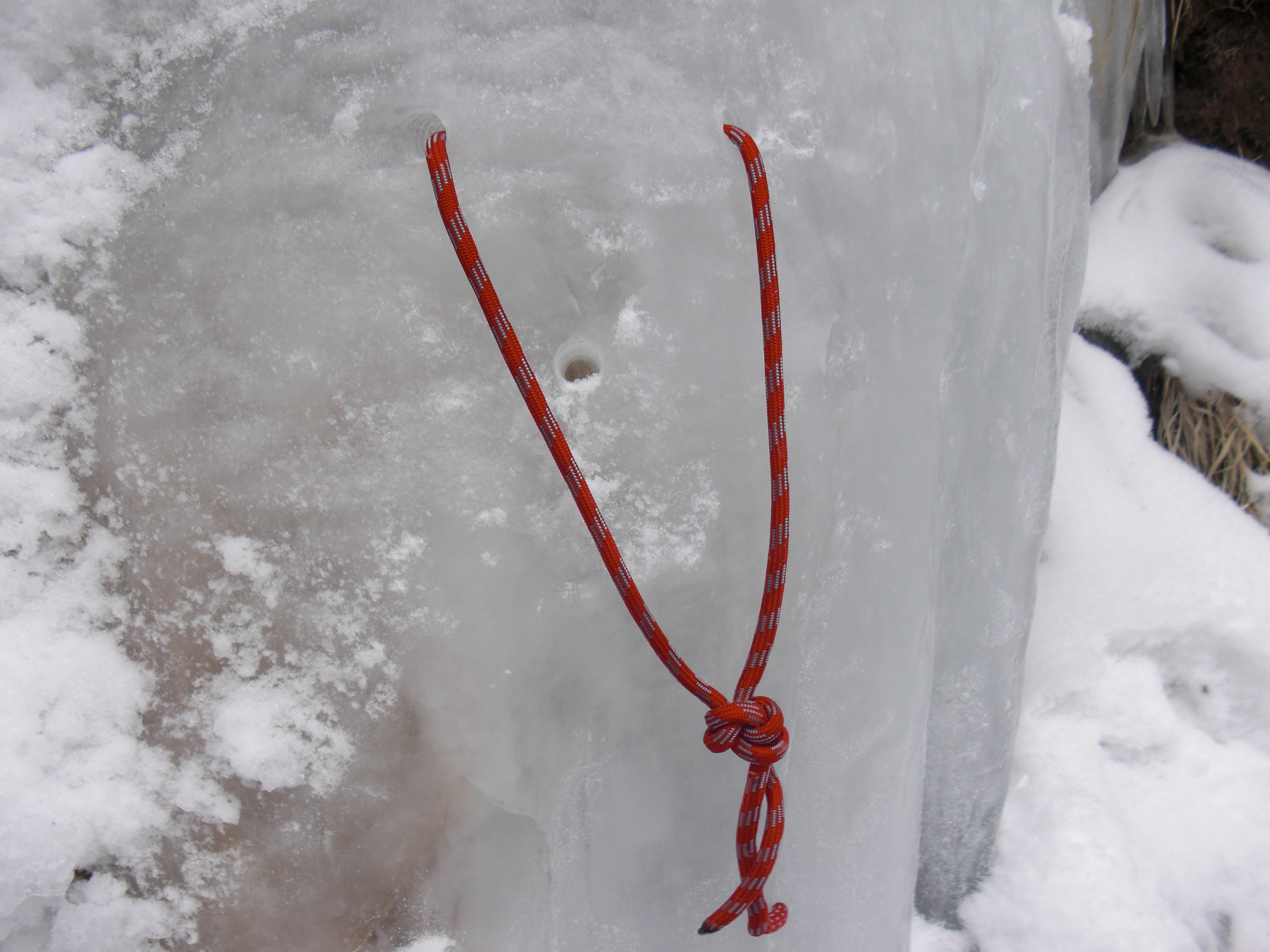
Abalakov thread

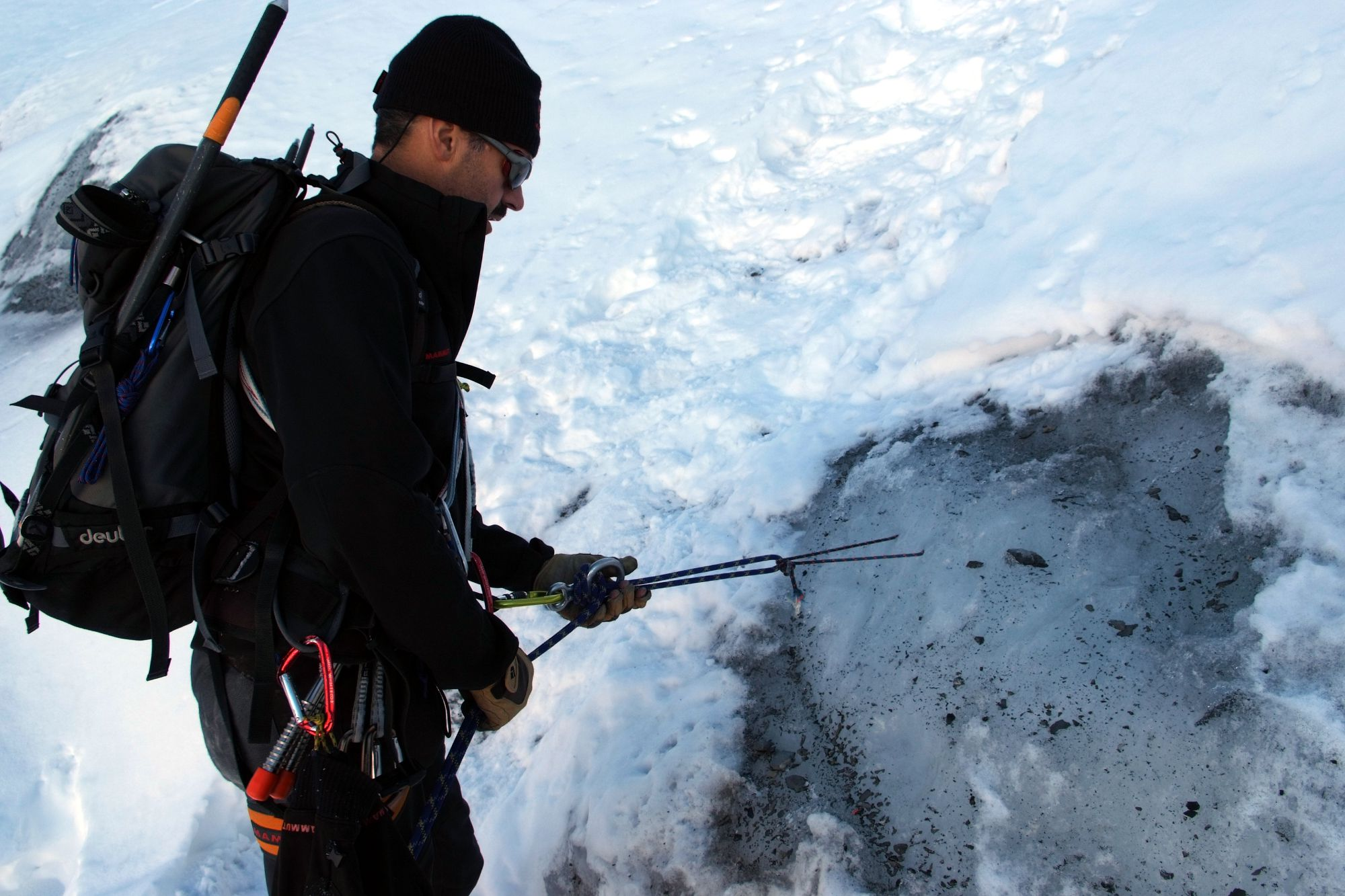
Abseiling with an Abalakov thread

The Abalakov thread, also known as a V-thread, A-thread, or 0-thread (zero thread), is an ice protection technique named after its inventor, Soviet climber Vitaly Abalakov. The Abalakov thread is a common method of protecting oneself while ice climbing because it is easy to create, does not require the sacrifice of expensive gear, and can be very safe when used properly. An Abalakov thread is often used in multi-pitch ice climbing routes. Because of its safety and convenience, the Abalakov thread is considered one of the most significant innovations in ice climbing. It significantly expanded the scope of possible routes and abseiling safety.

== Description ==
An Abalakov thread can be constructed using an ice screw, 1–2 metres (3.3–6.6 ft) of appropriate strength cord or webbing, and hook-like Abalakov threading device. Two holes are drilled in the ice, which interconnect at the ends to form a v-like channel in the ice. The cord or webbing is then threaded through this hole, and tied with a knot such as a fisherman's knot, or a water knot. This loop is then used to hang the abseiling rope. Abalakov thread can only be constructed in solid ice (or quality rock). The holes need to be drilled at the correct angle (about 45–50° compared to ice surface), and care must be taken that they interconnect. The surfaces of the holes need to have sufficient distance (about 17–20 centimetres, 6.7–7.9 in) between them. If the ice is not strong enough, it is possible to use two Abalakovs to balance the force, although if a second Abalakov thread is needed, an alternative route is strongly recommended.

A 2009 finding and experiments have shown a vertical rather than horizontal arrangement of the holes to be stronger (12%) (Smith, 2009). This configuration has been termed the A thread.

Though the Abalakov thread is considered to be as strong as any ice screw placement, a backup ice screw is frequently used for the first abseil. This allows for increased safety if mistakes were made in the creation of the Abalakov thread, and allows the strength of the thread to be observed.

== Notes ==
A V-thread and an A-thread are the same thing, but the term "A-thread" often refers to a thread that is vertically-oriented (one hole above the other), while a V-thread is horizontally-oriented (side by side). A 0-thread is sometimes referred to when the rope is threaded through the holes instead of a sacrificial piece of webbing or cord. The advantage is that the climber leaves no trace however, the rope can freeze. Typically used in ice, it is sometimes also used in canyoning when traditional bolted anchors have been or will get damaged during the wet season.

== See also ==
- Abseiling
- Ice climbing
- List of Russian inventions
