= Alfred Schwarzenbach (equestrian) =

Swiss equestrian

Personal information
- Nationality: Swiss
- Born: 8 October 1941 (age 84)
- Relative: Alfred Schwarzenbach Sr. (grandfather)

Sport
- Sport: Equestrian

Alfred Schwarzenbach (born 8 October 1941) is a Swiss equestrian. He competed in two events at the 1972 Summer Olympics.
