= Vitaly Abalakov =

Soviet mountaineer, chemical engineer and inventor

Vitaly Mikhaylovich Abalakov
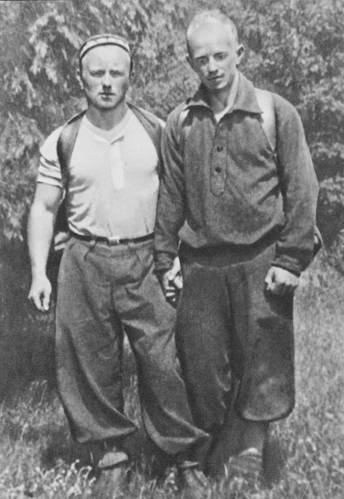
- Vitaly (right) with his brother Yevgeniy, 1920s
- Born: 13 January 1906; Krasnoyarsk, Yeniseysk Governorate, Russian Empire
- Died: 26 May 1986 (aged 80); Moscow, Russian SFSR, USSR
- Education: D. Mendeleev University of Chemical Technology of Russia
- Occupations: chemical engineer, mountaineer and inventor

Vitaly Mikhaylovich Abalakov (Russian: Вита́лий Миха́йлович Абала́ков) (13 January 1906 [O.S. 31 December 1905] – 26 May 1986) was a Soviet chemical engineer, mountaineer and inventor.

Brother of Yevgeniy Abalakov, another famous alpinist, he made the first Soviet ascent of Lenin Peak in 1934 and two more ascents of this mountain. In 1936 he also made the ascent of Khan Tengri, where he lost several fingers on one arm and one-third of his foot.

In 1938, he and others from his team were arrested by NKVD and were under investigation until 1940. He was accused of "open public propaganda" of western mountaineering techniques and "diminishing" domestic alpinists' achievements and being a "German spy".

Abalakov is credited with such inventions as camming devices in the 1930s, Abalakov thread (or V-thread), gearless ice climbing anchor, and many other climbing equipment innovations. From 1938 to 1940, he was imprisoned under investigation as a “German spy”; while in custody, his teeth were knocked out. Many of the mountaineers arrested together with him were executed. On February 20, 1940, the case was closed.

== Awards ==
- Order of Lenin (1957)
- Order of the Badge of Honour (1972)
- Honoured Master of Sports of the USSR (1943)
- Honoured Trainer of the USSR (1961)

== See also ==
- List of Russian inventors

== Bibliography ==
- (in Russian) Расстрельное время
