= Ulrich Wille =

Swiss general (1848–1925)

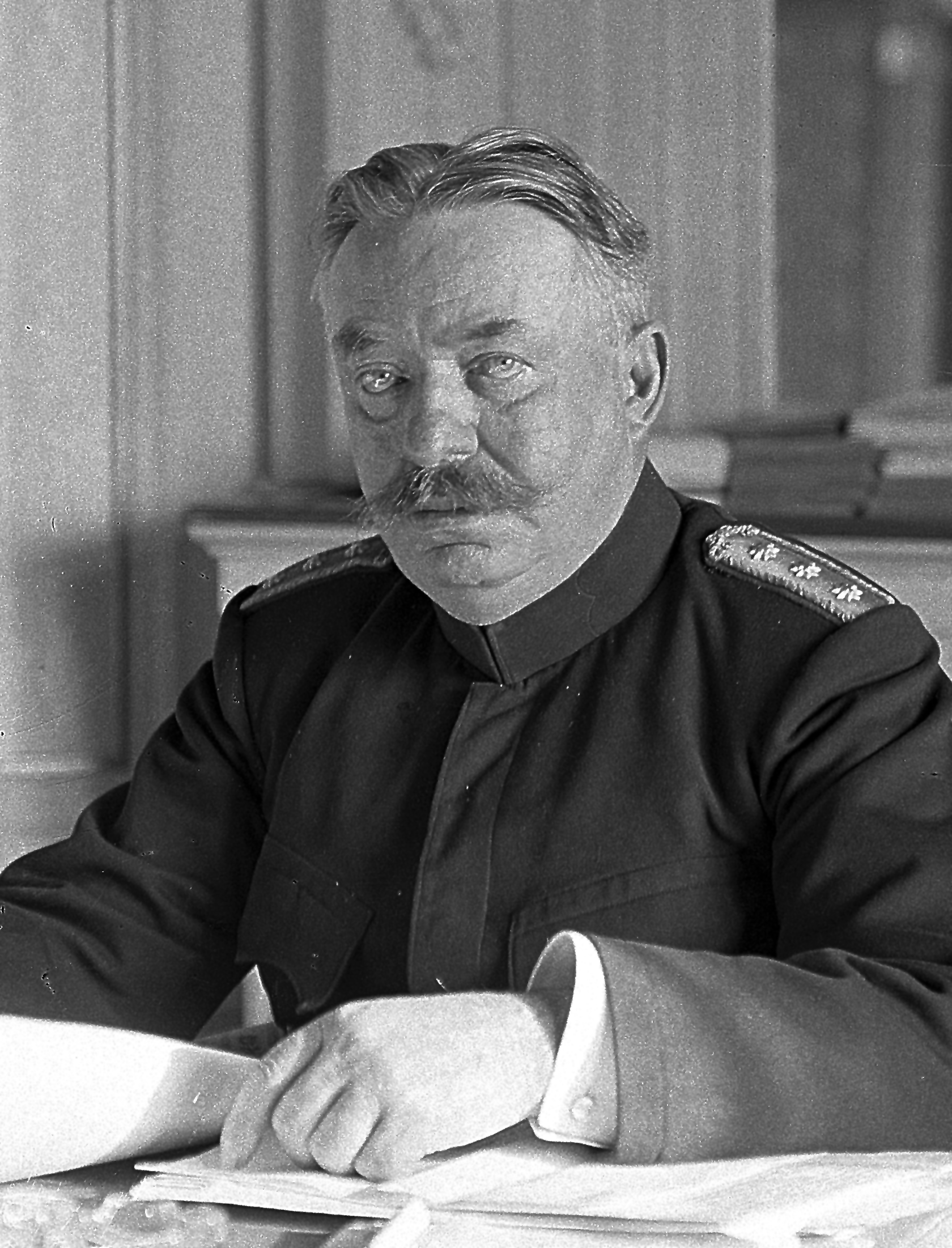
- Wille during the First World War
- Born: 5 April 1848; Hamburg, Germany
- Died: 31 January 1925 (aged 76); Meilen, Switzerland
- Relatives: Hinrich Braren (great-grandfather); Robert Miles Sloman (grandfather); Renée Schwarzenbach-Wille (daughter); Annemarie Schwarzenbach (granddaughter)
- Military career
- Allegiance: Switzerland
- Service years: 1867–1925
- Rank: General
- Commands: Swiss Army

Conrad Ulrich Sigmund Wille (5 April 1848 – 31 January 1925) was a Swiss military officer who served as General of the Swiss Army during the First World War. Inspired by the Prussian techniques that he had been able to observe at the time of his studies in Berlin, he attempted to impress the Swiss Army with a spirit based on instruction, discipline and technical control.

== Early life and family ==
Wille was born on 5 April 1848 in Hamburg, Germany to journalist François Wille (1811–1896) and novelist Eliza Wille (née Sloman, 1809–1893). The Wille family was originally from La Sagne in Neuchâtel, a French-speaking Swiss canton. One of his ancestors, Henri Vuille (1714–1760), moved to Germany and altered the family name to the more German "Wille". François Wille, a radical democrat, was elected to the Frankfurt National Assembly during the German revolutions of 1848–1849. Wille's family left Hamburg after the revolution's failure, settling in Switzerland in 1851.

Wille grew up in Mariafeld, the family estate in Meilen in the canton of Zürich. He attended a cadet school alongside primary school, and was then educated by his parents. From 1865, Wille studied law at Zürich, Halle, and Heidelberg, where he obtained a doctorate in 1869.

== Early career ==
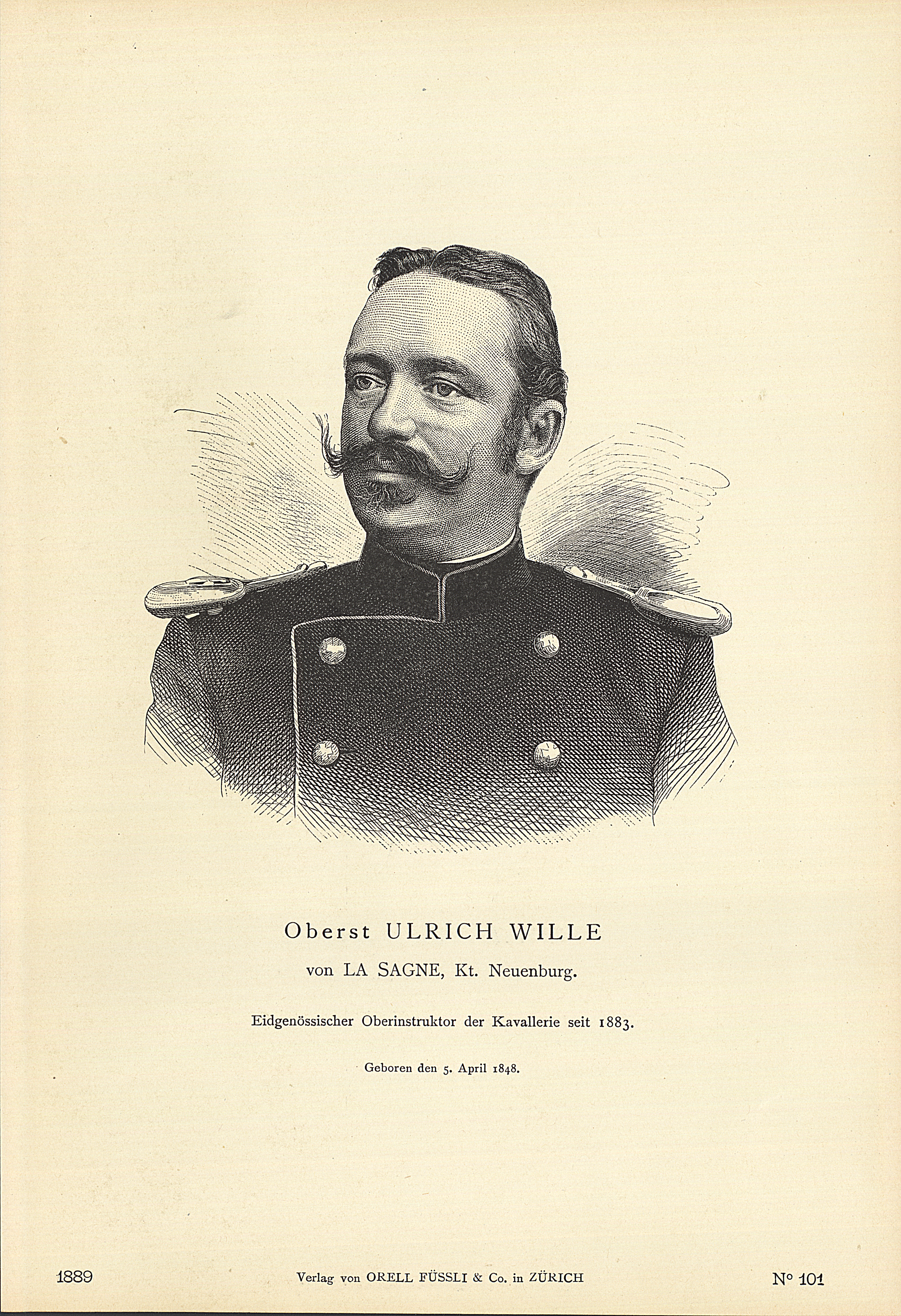
Wille c. 1889

During the Franco-Prussian War, Wille, then a lieutenant, was posted to the borders as part of the Swiss mobilization of 1870-1871. Under Hermann Bleuler's influence, he began a career as an artillery instructor in 1871. Wille was sent to the 1st Artillery Regiment of Prussia's Guard Corps and to the United Artillery and Engineering School in Berlin. He completed his education at Switzerland's Federal Instructor School in 1872, and two years later was appointed captain in the federal artillery staff.

From the beginning of his activity as an instructor in Thun in 1872, Wille reflected on the methods to be applied in his field and published articles on military policy. In 1880 he bought the Zeitschrift für Artillerie und Genie ("Journal for Artillery and Engineering"), which he used to campaign for military training reform according to the Prussian model until his appointment as chief instructor of the cavalry. Promoted to colonel in 1885, Wille was made commander of the cavalry in 1892.

== World War I ==
=== Election as general ===
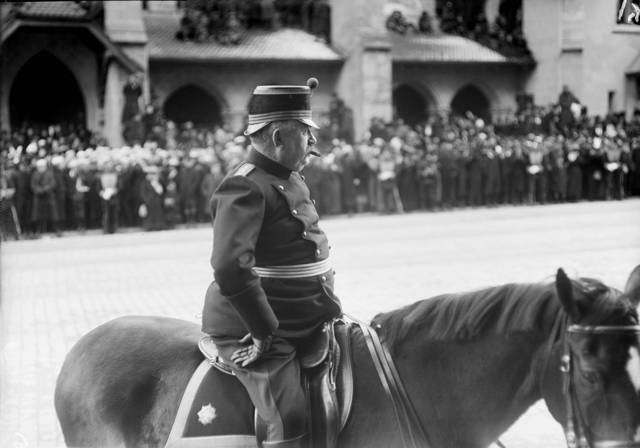
Wille as Commander-in-Chief of the Swiss Army, 1914–1918

Upon the outbreak of the First World War, Switzerland confirmed its will to remain neutral and issued a general mobilization of all military forces. On 3 August 1914, Wille was elected General by the United Federal Assembly with 122 votes, against 63 votes for Theophil Sprecher von Bernegg. Sprecher would soon assume the post of Chief of the General Staff and become a reliable partner of Wille's.

During the First World War, Switzerland was divided between the German-speaking Swiss, who tended to favor the Central Powers, and the French and Italian-speaking Swiss, whose opinions tended to support the Allies. As a Germanophile, close to Kaiser Wilhelm II, Wille benefitted from the pro-German current and the disparity within the Swiss Federal Council, which counted only one member from the French areas. The opponents of the general described him as militarist, whereas his partisans saw in him a leader ready to manage an army in mobilization thanks to his pedagogical talents. Wille decided to concentrate the bulk of his forces (238,000 men and 50,000 horses) close to the borders, particularly in Ajoie and Engadin.

=== Political issues ===
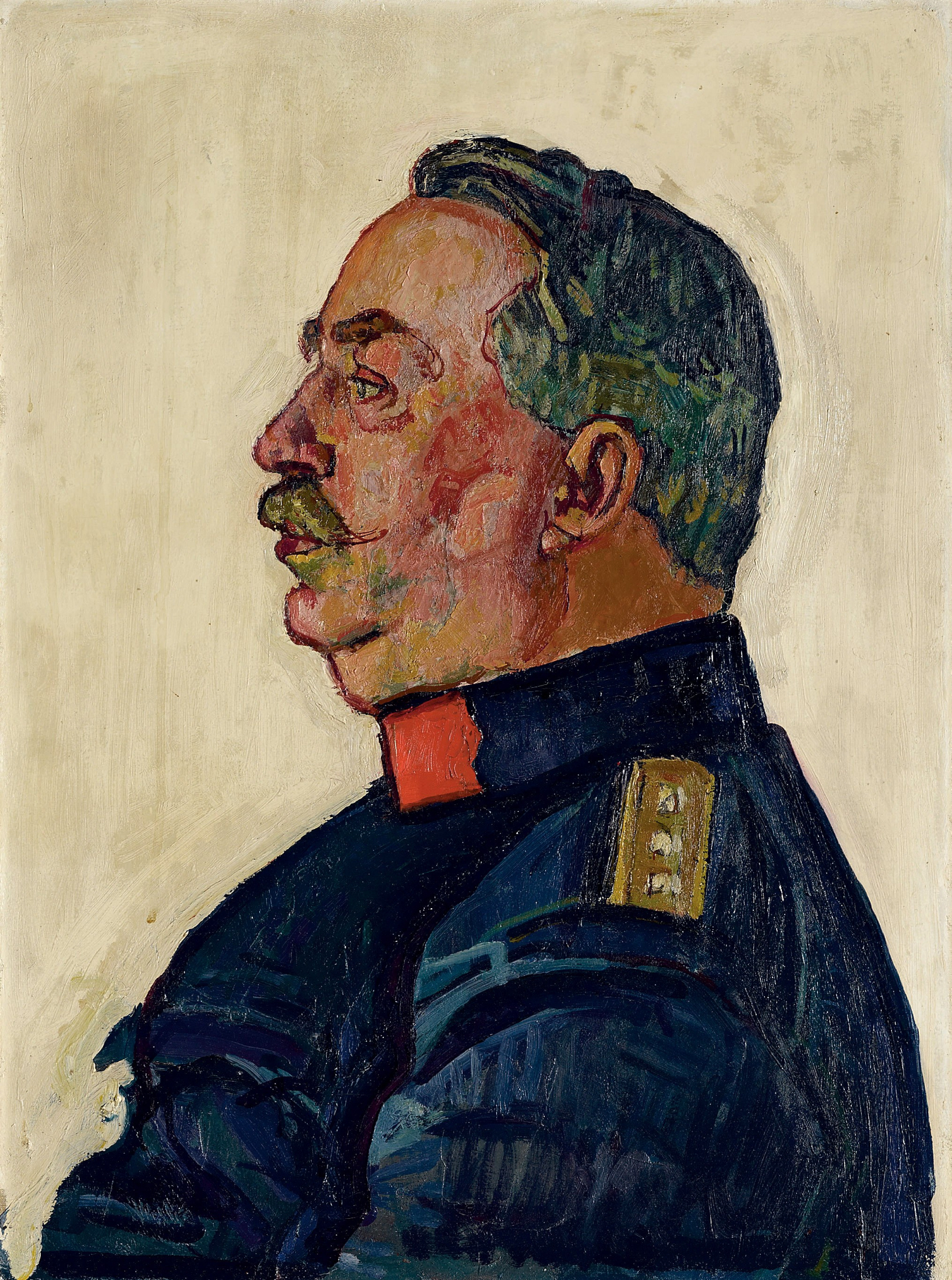
Portrait by Ferdinand Hodler, 1915

The mandate of Wille was rife with political problems. A scandal occurred in the French-speaking area of Switzerland when Wille proposed to the Federal Council on 20 July 1915, to enter the war on the side of the Central Powers. Thereafter, the "Colonels' Affair" in 1916 also had a great repercussion. Two Swiss colonels had given German and Austro-Hungarian diplomats specimens of the "Staff Gazette", a confidential journal, and Russian messages deciphered by Swiss cryptanalysts. The affair risked Swiss neutrality since it implied collusion with one of the belligerents. Wille decided to condemn the two colonels to 20 days' detention, an unsatisfactory sentence in the eyes of the pro-Allied party.

The confrontation between French-speaking Switzerland and German-speaking Switzerland widened. The German-language newspapers supported the German actions in Belgium, whereas the French ones highlighted the resistance of the Allied forces against German troops.

The economic situation was poor and many strikes occurred, reaching their apogee with the Swiss general strike from 11 November to 14 November 1918. In a note dated 10 November 1918, Wille announced his concern for the rise of Bolshevism and the internal disorders to come in the country:

Two years ago, I was brought on several occasions to share with the Federal Council my conviction that the congresses of Zimmerwald and Kiental had decided to begin with Switzerland the process of inversion of the established order in Europe. The triumph of the Bolsheviks in Russia supported this project. Everyone knows that many messengers of Russian Bolsheviks, having vast sums of money, are in Switzerland with an aim of exploiting the situation and to accelerate the execution of this plan.

But he added that it was necessary to avoid violence:

We should not seek the confrontation, nor the civil war. Our duty is to prevent them. (...) All risings which occurred in Zurich so far showed clearly that the local authorities are not capable of intervening without causing serious bloodshed. I do not reproach the persons in charge. Their difficulties are inherent in the democratic institutions. This has been known for a long time and this is why the Confederation must intervene in time.

Meanwhile, Wille had to manage the pandemic of the Spanish influenza, which affected the troops and the recruit schools. In order to combat the spread of the epidemic, enlistment of new recruits was delayed.

== Personal life ==
In 1872, Wille married Constanza Maria Amalia Clara von Bismarck (1851–1946), the daughter of Lieutenant-General Friedrich Wilhelm von Bismarck, a distant relative of Chancellor Otto von Bismarck.

His eldest son, also named Ulrich Wille, followed his father's footsteps in the military, ultimately becoming a corps Commander. Wille Jr. also managed to keep his father's pro-German tendencies throughout his career, including during the Second World War. This would contribute to his tensions with the next Swiss General, Henri Guisan.

His daughter Renée Schwarzenbach-Wille, who was married to silk tycoon Alfred Schwarzenbach, was an Olympic horsewoman and prolific photographer. His granddaughter was the author, traveler, and photographer Annemarie Schwarzenbach.
