= Schwarzenbach Enterprises =

Swiss American textile manufacturer

- Native name: Robt. Schwarzenbach & Co AG
- Company type: Private company
- Industry: Textiles
- Founded: 1829; 197 years ago as Robt. Schwarzenbach Thalwil, Switzerland; 1888; 138 years ago as Schwarzenbach, Huber & Co; New York City, U.S.
- Founder: Johannes Schwarzenbach-Landis
- Defunct: 1981
- Fate: Business transformation
- Revenue: CHF 267 millions (1928)
- Number of employees: 28,000+ (1928)
- Subsidiaries: Schwarzenbach, Huber & Co

The Schwarzenbach Enterprises (respectively Robt. Schwarzenbach & Co and Schwarzenbach Huber & Co) was a Swiss American textile concern with a focus on silk and jacquard manufacturing.

Established in 1829, Schwarzenbach has evolved into the largest textile concern in the world. In 1928, the concern employed over 28,000 workers worldwide with an annual revenue of 267 million Swiss Francs (equivalent to approximately $972 million in 2026). The majority of the economic activity was generated through the subsidiary Schwarzenbach, Huber & Co. based in the Schwarzenbach Buildings on 14-42 38th street in New York City.

With the oil crisis and the following economic crisis in the Swiss textile industry the company started to close mill after mill. In 1981, production at the headquarters in Thalwil, Switzerland seized. The company remains to exist as a shell corporation holding the associated real estate in Switzerland.

== Literature ==
- Verein für Wirtschaftshistorische Studien Zürich (Hrsg.): Schweizer Pioniere der Wirtschaft und Technik, Bd. 10, 1959 (in German)
- Robert J.F Schwarzenbach, The Schwarzenbach Enterprises, New York, 1917
- Fritz Hess: Thalwil im 19. Jahrhundert, Zürcher Dissertation, 1938 (in German)
- Hans Jakob Zwicky: Chronik der Gemeinde Thalwil, 1995 (in German)
- E. Vögtlin: An die Firma Robert Schwarzenbach anlässlich des Jubiläums 1954 (in German)
- Hochschule Luzern, Silk Memory: Schwarzenbach
- Hochschule Luzern, Silk Memory: Mechanische Seidenstoffweberei Adliswil MSA (in German)
