= Vanj Range =

Mountain range in Tajikistan

Vanj Range Ванчский хребет Қаторкӯҳи Ванҷ
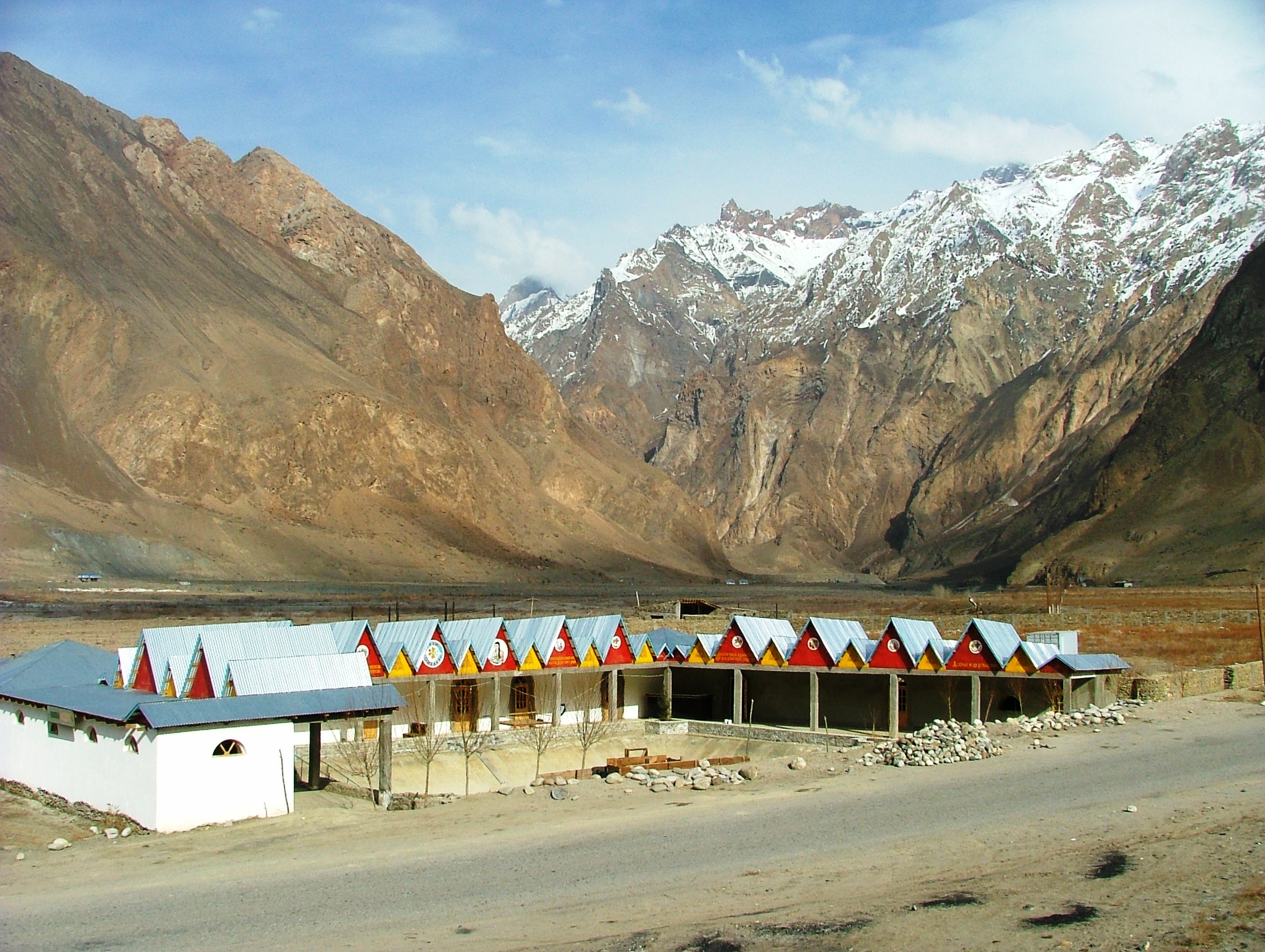
- View of the Vanj Range

Highest point
- Peak: High Yazgulem Peak
- Elevation: 5,588 m (18,333 ft)
- Coordinates: 38°33′00″N 72°01′00″E

Dimensions
- Length: 85 km (53 mi) NE/SW
- Width: 15 km (9.3 mi) NW/SE

Geography
- Location within Tajikistan
- Country: Tajikistan
- Parent range: Pamir Mountains

Geology
- Rock age: Paleozoic
- Rock type(s): Granite, conglomerate and sandstone

The Vanj Range (Russian: Ванчский хребет; Tajik: Қаторкӯҳи Ванҷ) is a mountain range of Vanj district, Gorno-Badakhshan, Tajikistan.

== Geography ==
It lies to the south of the Academy of Sciences Range, between the Darvaz Range to the north and the Yazgulem Range to the south. Running parallel to them, it separates the valleys of the Vanj River and the Yazgulyam River. The total glaciated area of the range is 164 km^{2}.

=== Peaks ===
Its highest summit is glacier-covered High Yazgulem Peak (5,588 m). Other peaks are Vanchek Peak (5,428 m), Hauck Peak (5,092 m), Kuh-i Rau (4,964 m), Sokolov Peak (4,808 m) and Ku-i Zoh (4,664 m).

== See also ==
- List of mountains in Tajikistan
- List of mountains of Uzbekistan
