= List of mountains of Tajikistan =

== Peaks ==
Pamir-Alay

- Pamir Mountains
  - Academy of Sciences Range
    - Ismoil Somoni Peak
    - Peak Korzhenevskaya (Ozodi)
    - Mount Garmo
  - Rushan Range
    - Patkhor Peak
  - Shakhdara Range
    - Mayakovskiy Peak
    - Karl Marx Peak
  - Trans-Alay Range
    - Ibn Sina Peak (Lenin)
  - Yazgulem Range
    - Independence Peak (Revolution)
  - Peter I Range
    - Moscow Peak
  - Gissar Range
    - Khazret Sultan
  - Shughnon Range
    - Pik Skalisty
- Alay Mountains
- Fann Mountains
- Zeravshan Range
  - Chimtarga Peak
- Concord Peak

Tian Shan

- Turkestan Range
- Vakhsh Range
