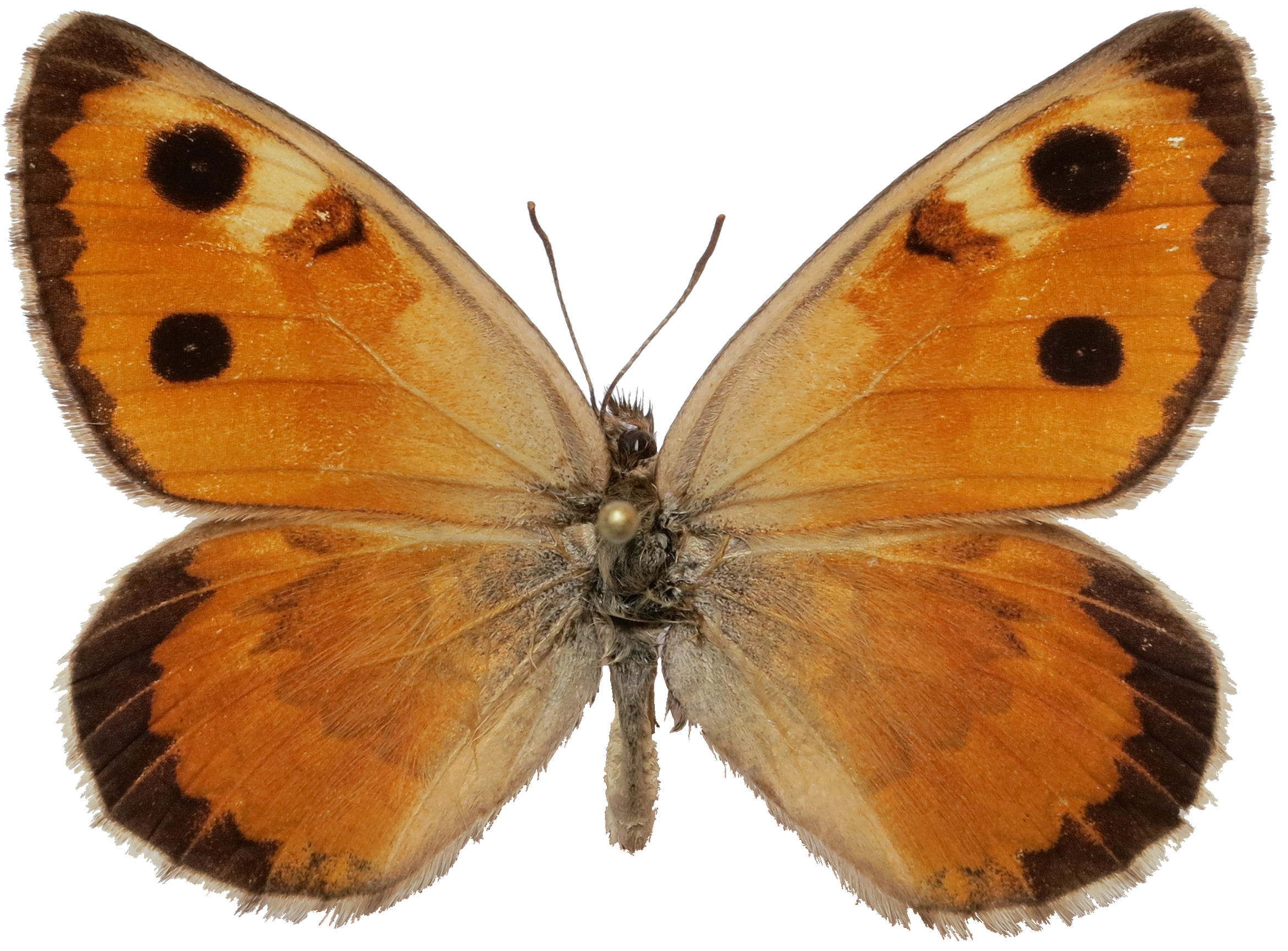
- K. leechi intermedius from Kyrgyzstan

Scientific classification
- Domain: Eukaryota
- Kingdom: Animalia
- Phylum: Arthropoda
- Class: Insecta
- Order: Lepidoptera
- Family: Nymphalidae
- Genus: Karanasa
- Species: K. leechi

Binomial name
- Karanasa leechi (Grum-Grshimailo, 1890)

Synonyms
- Satyrus leechi Grum-Grshimailo, 1890; Satyrus intermedius Grum-Grshimailo, 1890

= Karanasa leechi =

Species of butterfly

Karanasa leechi is a butterfly of the family Nymphalidae. It is found in Asia, including the Darvaz Range in the Pamirs and the Hindu Kush.

The habitat consists of xerophytic slopes with thin vegetation at 3,500 to 4,700 meters above sea level.

Adults are on wing from July to August.

== Subspecies ==
- Karanasa leechi leechi (Pamirs)
- Karanasa leechi intermedius Grum-Grshimailo, 1890 (Zaalaisky Mountains)
- Karanasa leechi erubescens Avinoff & Sweadner, 1951 (Peter I Mountains)
- Karanasa leechi alitchura Avinoff & Sweadner, 1951 (southern Pamirs)
- Karanasa leechi centralis Avinoff & Sweadner, 1951 (eastern Pamirs)
- Karanasa leechi gregorii Avinoff & Sweadner, 1951 (south-western Chinese Turkestan)
- Karanasa leechi mihmana Avinoff & Sweadner, 1951 (south-eastern Pamirs)
- Karanasa leechi hunza Avinoff & Sweadner, 1951 (north-western India (Hunza Valley))
