= Vanj (river) =

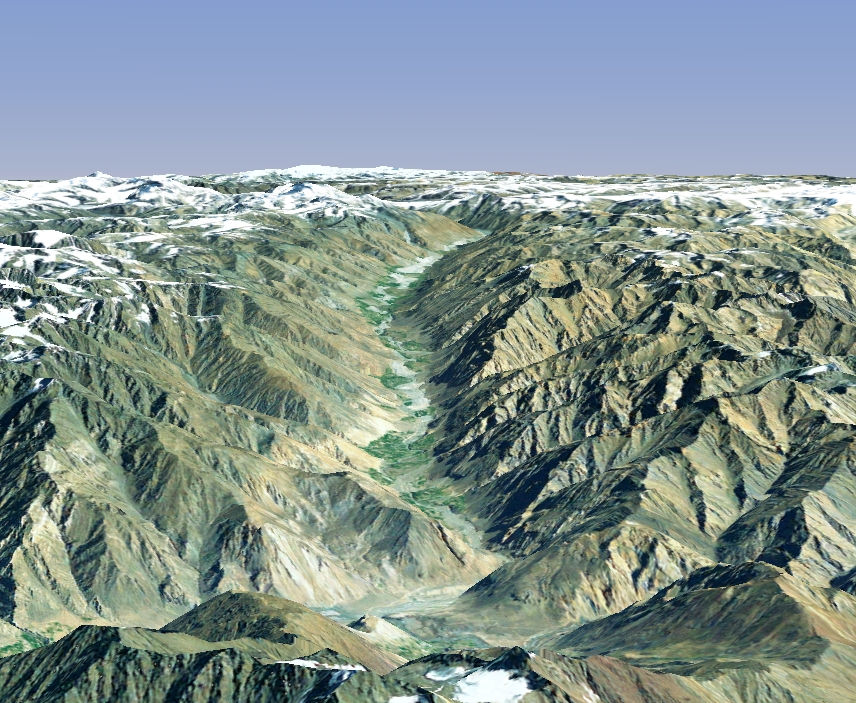
- The valley of the Vanj

Location
- Country: Tajikistan

Physical characteristics
- Mouth: Panj
  - coordinates: 38.2886°N 71.3315°E
- Length: 103 km (64 mi)
- Basin size: 2,070 km^{2} (800 sq mi)

Basin features
- Progression: Panj→ Amu Darya→ Aral Sea

The Vanj (Tajik: Ванҷ, Russian: Ванч Vanch) is a river in east Tajikistan. It is a right tributary of the Panj in Vanj District, north-western Gorno-Badakhshan. The river is 103 kilometres (64 mi) long and has a basin area of 2,070 square kilometres (800 mi^{2}). It flows southwest between the Darvoz Range to the north and the Vanj Range to the south, joining the Panj on the border with Afghanistan. The Vanj valley is broader and more fertile than other valleys feeding the Panj. Vanj town is about 20 km upstream from the Panj. At the head of the valley, beyond the village of Po-i-Mazar, the river turns southeast (going upstream) and is fed by the Geographical Society Glacier near Independence Peak. Beyond the head of the valley are the Academy of Sciences Range and the Fedchenko Glacier.

South, on the other side of the Vanj Range, is the valley of the Yazgulem. The Vanji language, formerly spoken in the valley, is extinct.
