= Vanj =

Vanj Russian: Вандж/Ванч Tajik: Ванҷ
- Village and Jamoat
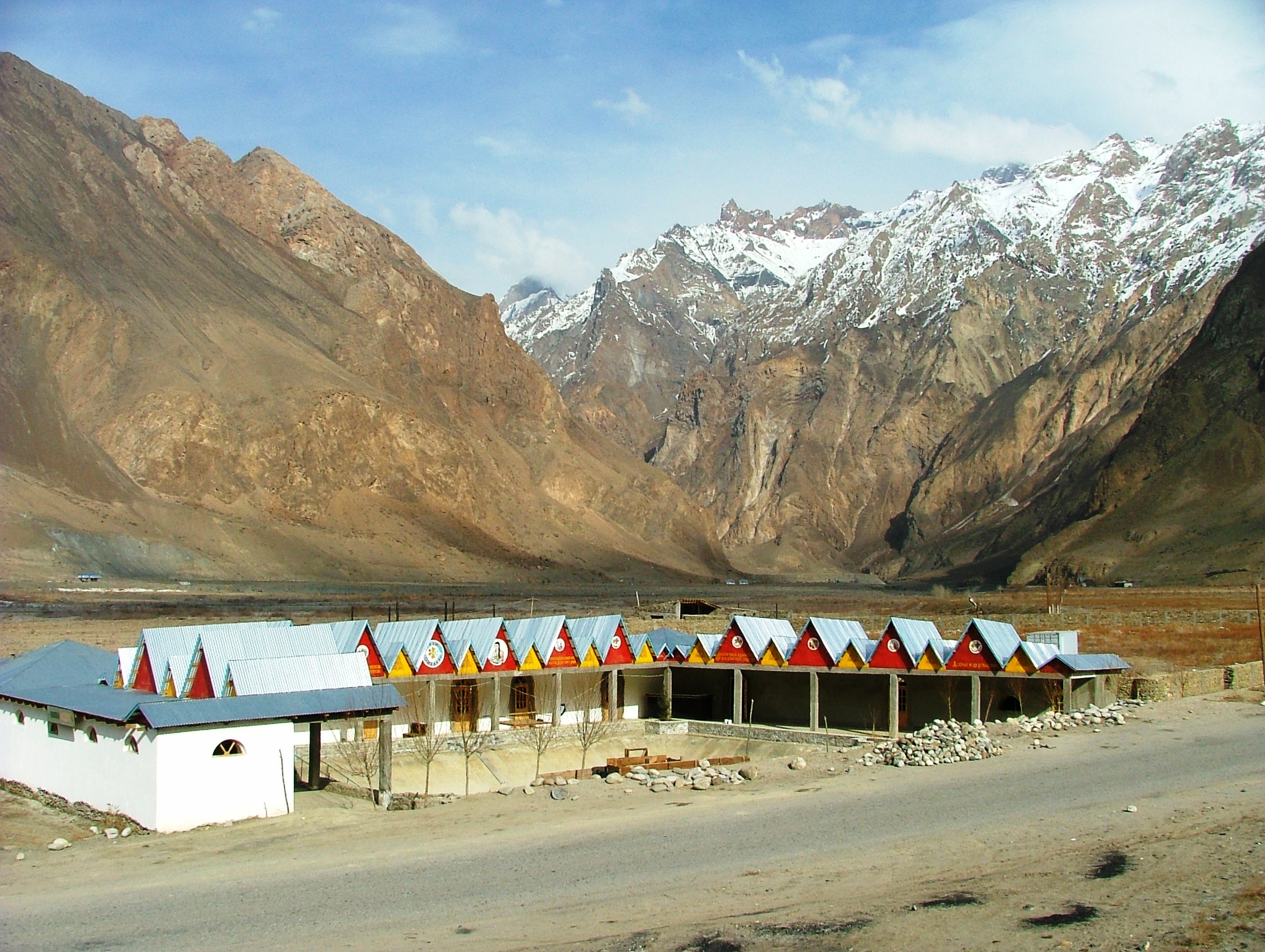
- Vanj gas station

- Location in Tajikistan
- Coordinates: 38°22′23″N 71°27′19″E
- Country: Tajikistan
- Region: Gorno-Badakhshan
- District: Vanj District
- Elevation: 1,722 m (5,650 ft)

Population (2015)
  - Total: 11,217
- Climate: Dsa
- Official languages: Russian (Interethnic); Tajik (State)

Vanj (Russian: Вандж/Ванч; Tajik: Ванҷ, also transliterated as Vandzh, Vanch) is a village and jamoat in Gorno-Badakhshan Autonomous Region, Tajikistan. It is the seat of the Vanj District. Vanj lies on the lower course of the river Vanj, a tributary of the Panj, separated from the Yazgulem to the south by the Vanj Range. The jamoat, which is also called Abdulloev, has a total population of 11,217 (2015).
