= Independence Mountain =

Bear Mountain may refer to:

- Independence Mountain in Summit County, Colorado
- Independence Mountain in Jefferson County, Colorado
- Independence Mountain in Lincoln County, Montana
- The Independence Mountains, a mountain range in Elko County, Nevada

== See also ==
- Independence Peak
