= Vanj District =

Vanj District Russian: Ванчский район Tajik: Ноҳияи Ванҷ
- District
- Location of Vanj District in Tajikistan
- Coordinates: 38°22′23″N 71°27′19″E
- Country: Tajikistan
- Region: Gorno-Badakhshan Autonomous Region
- Capital: Vanj

Area
  - Total: 4,430.5 km^{2} (1,710.6 sq mi)

Population (2020)
  - Total: 34,400
  - Density: 7.76/km^{2} (20.1/sq mi)
- Time zone: UTC+5 (TJT)
- Postal code: 736300
- Area code: +992 3551
- Official languages: Russian (Interethnic); Tajik (State)
- Website: vanj.tj

Vanj District or Nahiya-e Vanj (Tajik: Ноҳияи Ванҷ) is a district in eastern Tajikistan, in the north-west of the Gorno-Badakhshan Autonomous Region, with administrative capital Vanj.

It is located east of the river Panj at the point where the Panj turns from north to west. It is roughly rectangular, tending to the southwest. It is bounded on the west by the Panj and Afghanistan, on the northwest by Darvoz District, on the north by the Darvoz Range and Farkhor District of Khatlon Region, on the east (approximately) by the Academy of Sciences Range and Murghob District and on the south by the Yazgulem Range and Rushon District. It corresponds to the valleys of the rivers Vanj (north) and Yazgulem (south), separated by the Vanj Range. The population of Vanj District is 34,400 (1 January 2020 estimate).

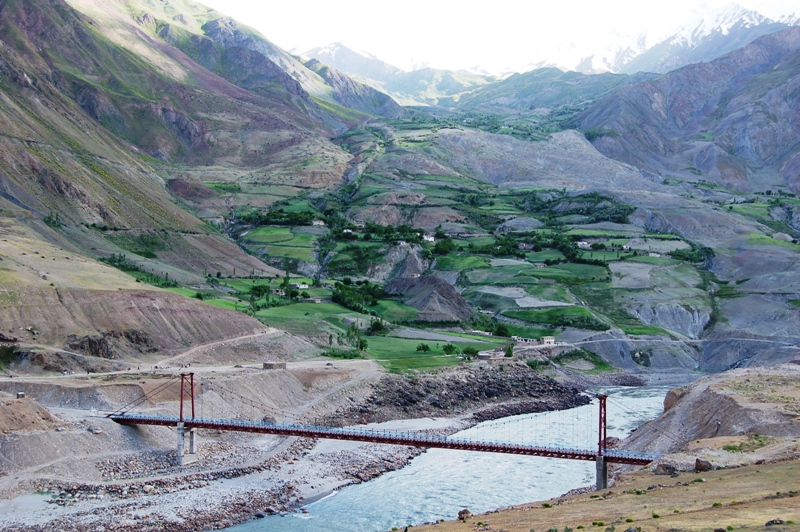
Friendship bridge between Afghanistan (Maimay District) and Tajikistan (Vanj District).

== Administrative divisions ==
The district has an area of about 4,400 km^{2} (2,000 sq mi) and is divided administratively into six jamoats. They are as follows:

Jamoat	Population (Jan. 2015)
Rovand	6,663
Tekharv	3,926
Vanj (Abulloev)	11,217
Vodkhud	2,457
Yazghulom	6,215
Zhovid	3,862
