= Yazgulyam =

Yazgulyam, alternatively spelt Yazgulyami, Yazgulami, Yazgulomi, and Iazgulemi, may refer to:

- Yazgulyam River in Tajikistan
- Yazgulem Range, a mountain range in the Pamir, Tajikistan
- Yazgulyam language, an Iranian language of Tajikistan
- Yazgulyam people of Tajikistan
