= Russian Geographical Society Glacier =

Glacier in Tajikistan

The Russian Geographical Society Glacier (RGS) (Russian: Ледник Географического Общества) it is a large glacier in the Vanch River basin in east Tajikistan, in the Gorno-Badakhshan Autonomous Province. It is located in the Pamir Mountains, near Independence Peak (formerly Revolution Peak), at approx. 38.6°N 72.3°E.

== See also ==
- Russian Geographical Society
- List of glaciers
