= Vanch-Yakh Glacier =

Glacier in Tajikistan

Coordinates: 38.767°N 72.283°E

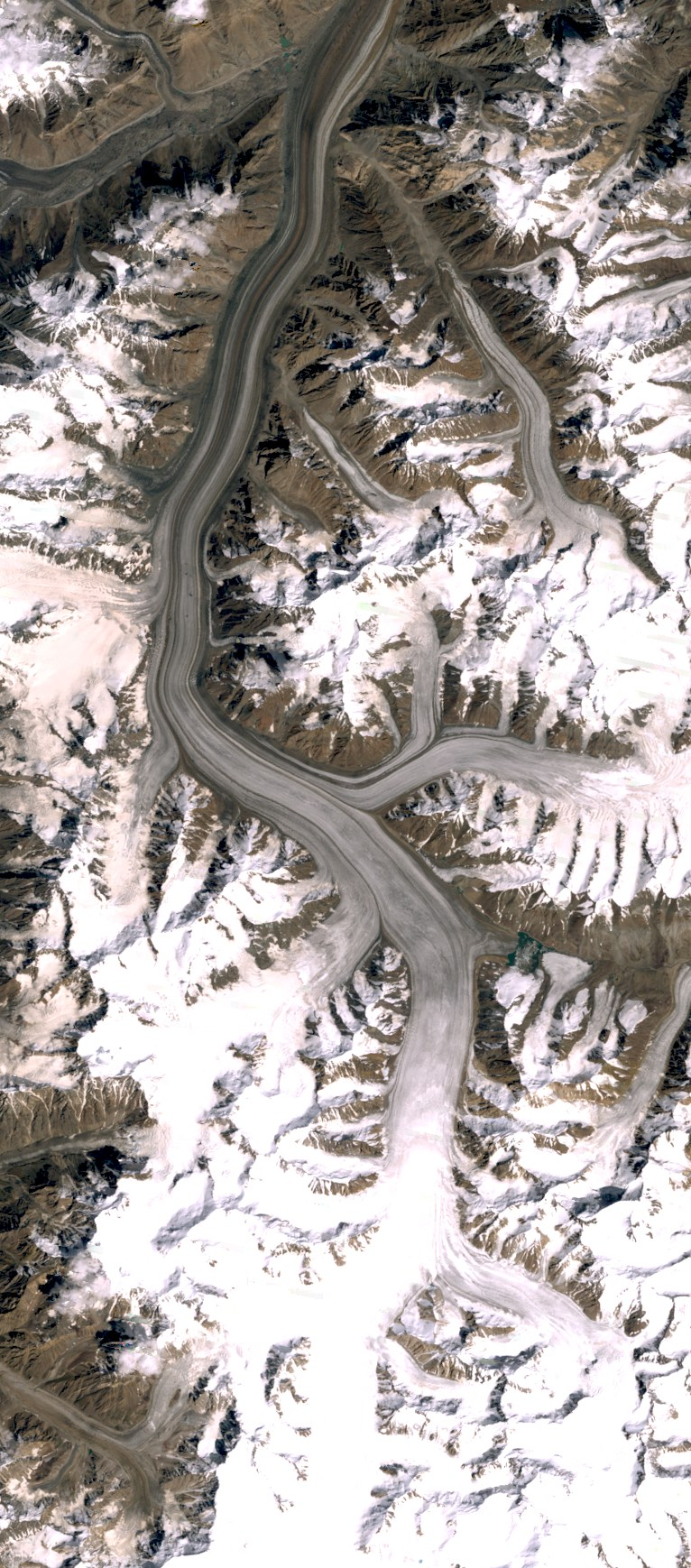
Fedchenko Glacier, Landsat 7 satellite image, 2008-08-22

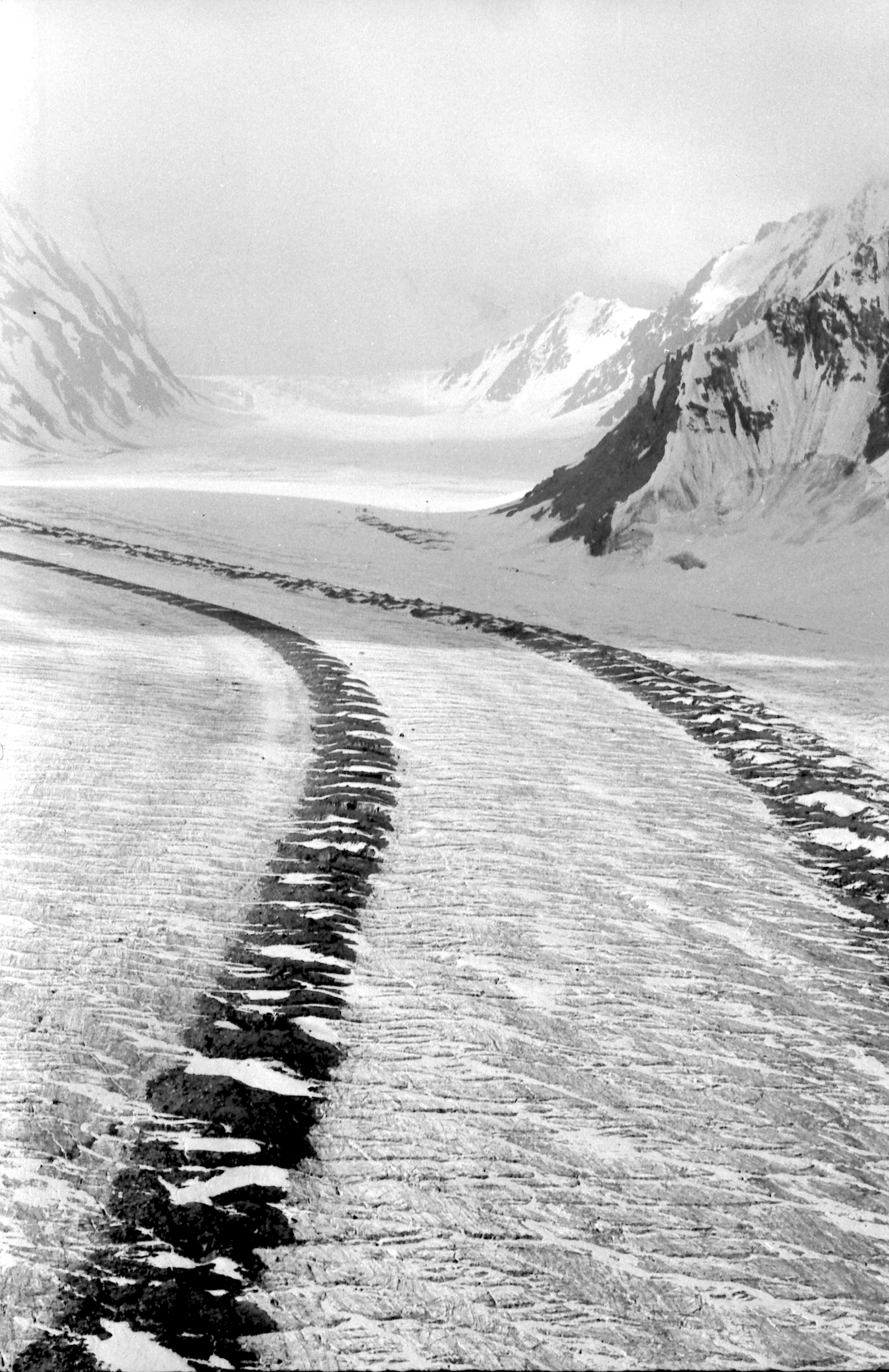
Fedchenko Glacier in 1982 by Jaan Künnap during expedition to Tartu Ülikool 350.

The Fedchenko Glacier (Russian: Ледник Федченко) or the Vanch-Yakh Glacier (Tajik: Пиряхи Ванҷях) is a large glacier in the Yazgulem Range, Pamir Mountains, of north-central Gorno-Badakhshan province, Tajikistan. The glacier is long and narrow, currently extending for 77 kilometres (48 mi) and covering over 700 square kilometres (270 sq mi). It is the longest glacier in the world outside of the polar regions. The maximum thickness of the glacier is 1,000 metres (3,300 ft), and the volume of the glacier and its dozens of tributaries is estimated at 144 cubic kilometres (35 cu mi)—about a third of the volume of Lake Erie.

== Path and location ==
The glacier follows a generally northward path to the east of the 6,595-metre (21,637-foot) Garmo Peak. The glacier begins at an elevation of 6,200 metres (20,300 ft) and eventually melts and empties into the Balandkiik River near the border with Kyrgyzstan at an elevation of 2,909 metres (9,544 ft). Its waters eventually feed down the Muksu, Surkhob, Vakhsh, and Amu Darya rivers into the Aral Sea.

To the west is the Tajik National Academy of Sciences Range, Mount Garmo, Ismoil Somoni Peak, Peak Korzhenevskaya, the headwaters of the Vanj River, and Yazgulyam River. To the south is Independence Peak and to the east Gorbunov Peak (6,025 meters). To the north is Altyn Mazar.

== Discovery ==
The glacier was discovered in 1878 and was named after Alexei Pavlovich Fedchenko, a Russian explorer (but not the discoverer of the glacier). It was not fully explored until 1928 by a German-Soviet expedition under Willi Rickmer Rickmers. Between 1910 and 1913 the glacier expanded and moved forward by 800 to 1,000 metres (870 to 1,090 yd), blocking up the Balyandlik River the following year. It continued to recede between 1928 and 1960, stopping its inflows such as the Kosinenko, Ulugbeck, Alert and several others.

In 2023, Tajikistan officially renamed the glacier as part of a derussification program.

== See also ==
- List of glaciers
