= Khushqadam Khusravov =

Tajikistani male sambist

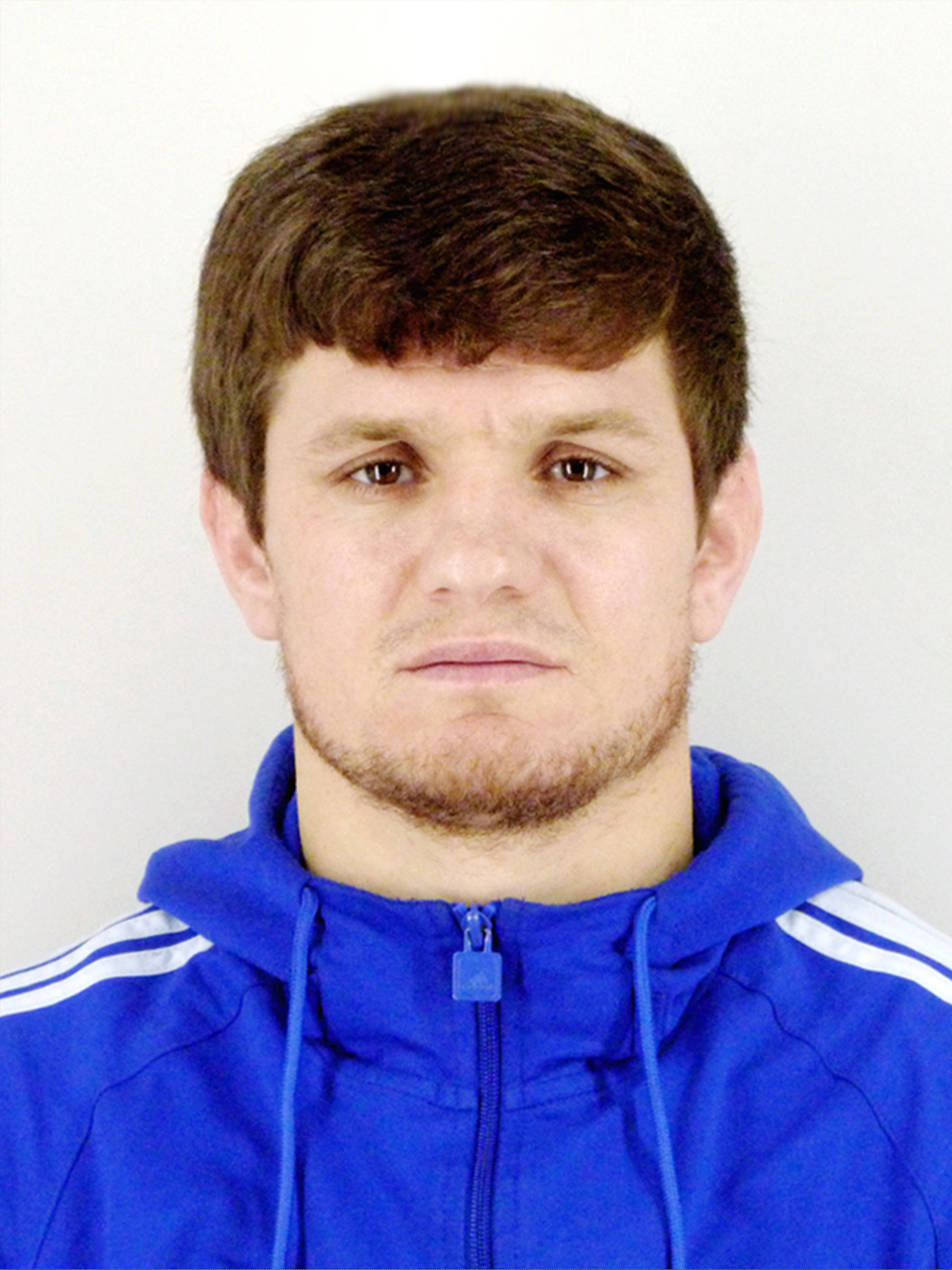

Personal information
- Full name: Khusravov Khushqadam Nasirovich
- Nationality: Tajikistani
- Born: 1 January 1993 (age 33) Vanj District, GBAO, Tajikistan
- Weight: 62 kg (137 lb)

Sport
- Country: Tajikistan
- Sport: sambo, judo, kurash

Khushqadam Khusravov (Tajik: Хусравов Хушқадам Носирович; January 1, 1993, village Rakharv, Vanj District, GBAO, Tajikistan) is a Tajikistani sambist, judoka. World Champion in sambo (2018).

== Biography ==
Khushqadam Khusravov was born on January 1, 1993, in the Vanj District. From an early age he showed an interest in the sports that his father is engaged in. At the age of 6, he began training under his guidance at the Wanj District Sports School. Graduated from the Tajik Institute of Physical Training.

In 2007, at the age of 14, Khushqadam, taking part in the republic's school sports day, won all qualifying tournaments and reached the final part, which was held in Dushanbe.

In Dushanbe, he won a gold medal and received an invitation to international sambo competitions in Belarus, and he won bronze.

After returning from Belarus, Khushqadam became a member of the Tajik national sambo team and continued training under the guidance of the famous Tajik wrestler, Master of sports of the USSR, Muhammadsharif Sulaimonov.

== Sports results ==
- World champion among youth (M&W) and juniors (M&W). October 10—14, 2013
- Multiple champion of Tajikistan in sambo, judo and national wrestling.
