= Catocala laura =

Scientific classification
- Kingdom: Animalia
- Phylum: Arthropoda
- Clade: Pancrustacea
- Class: Insecta
- Order: Lepidoptera
- Superfamily: Noctuoidea
- Family: Erebidae
- Genus: Catocala
- Species: C. laura

Binomial name
- Catocala laura Saldaitis, Ivinskis & Speidel, 2008

Species of moth

Catocala laura is a moth in the family Erebidae. It is found in Tajikistan and probably endemic to the Darvoz Range. It is named for Laura Saldaitytė.

The forewing length is 22–25 mm (0.87–0.98 in).
