= Moscow Peak =

Moscow Peak Russian: Пик Москва
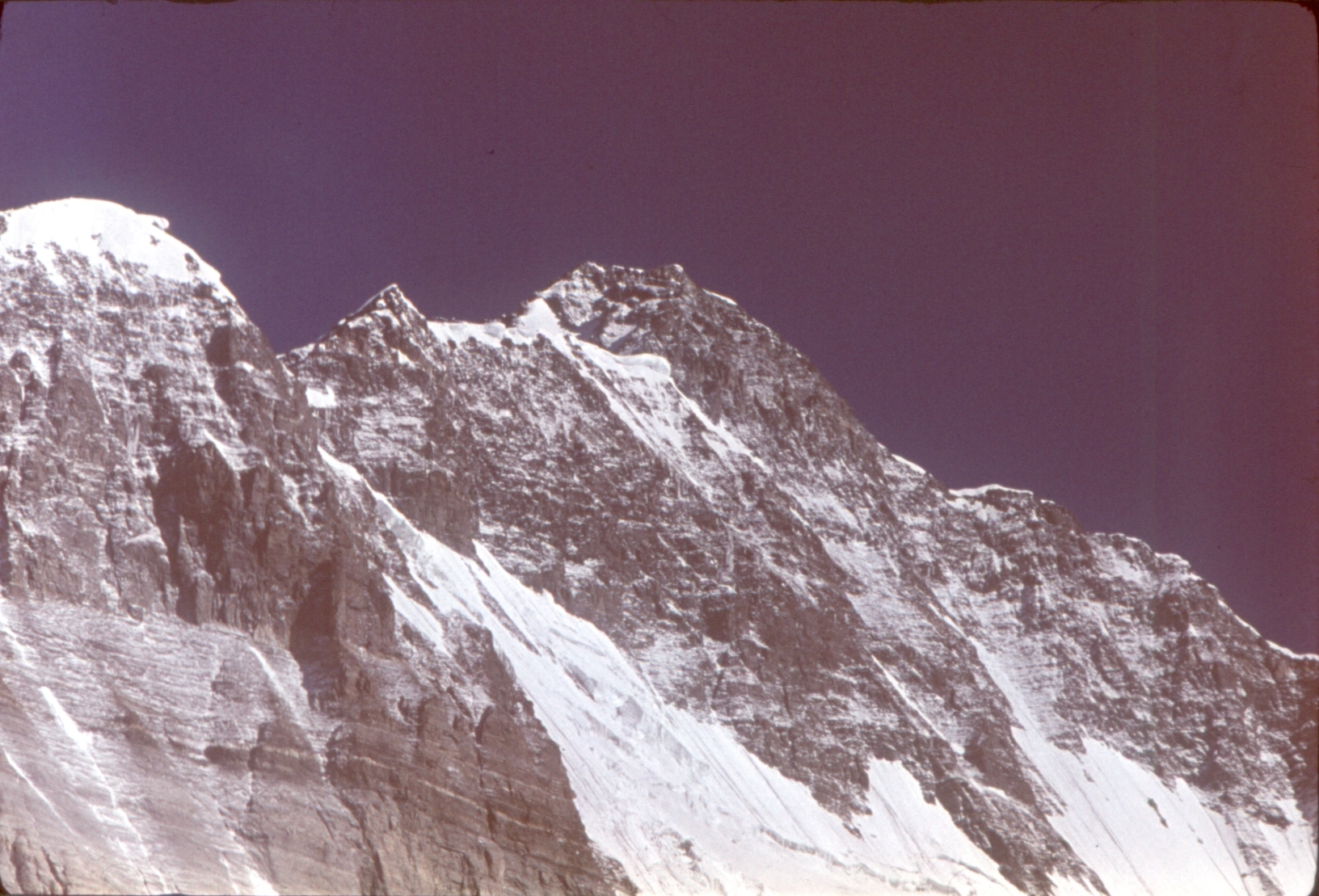
- View from the south in 1973

- Location in Tajikistan
- Coordinates: 38°57′N 71°54′E
- Country: Tajikistan

Moscow Peak, also Moskva Peak or Pik Moskva (Russian: Пик Москва and also Tajik: Қуллаи Москва), is a 6,785 m peak in the Peter I Range, western Pamir.

It is located in the south-east of Jirgatol district in Tajikistan's Region of Republican Subordination, about 10 km west of Ismail Samani Peak, Tajikistan's highest mountain.

Moscow Peak is also the name of two much smaller mountains in the United States and Australia:

- Moscow Peak in the State of Arizona (Yavapai County), U.S.A. (2,343 m, 34.403082N, 112.396001W)
- Moscow Peak in Victoria, Australia (1,647 m, 6.84401S, 148.1437E )
