= Rushan Range =

Mountain range in Tajikistan

- Location within Tajikistan

Highest point
- Peak: Patkhor Peak
- Elevation: 6,083 m (19,957 ft)
- Coordinates: 37°54′0″N 72°10′0″E

Dimensions
- Length: 120 km (75 mi) NE/SW
- Width: 35 km (22 mi) NW/SE

Naming
- Native name: Рушанский хребет (Russian)

Geography
- Country: Tajikistan
- Parent range: Pamir Mountains

Geology
- Rock age: Paleozoic
- Rock type(s): Granite, schist, quartzite, sandstone, limestone and gneiss

Rushan Range is a mountain range in south-western Pamir in Tajikistan, trending in the south-westerly direction from Sarez Lake toward Khorog, between Gunt River to the south and Bartang River to the north. About 120 km long, it reaches its highest elevation of 6,083 m at Patkhor Peak.

== See also ==
- List of mountains in Tajikistan
