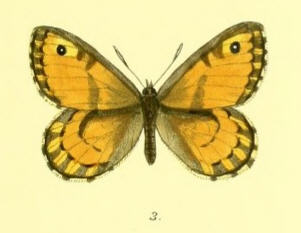
- Karanasa hubneri

Scientific classification
- Domain: Eukaryota
- Kingdom: Animalia
- Phylum: Arthropoda
- Class: Insecta
- Order: Lepidoptera
- Family: Nymphalidae
- Tribe: Satyrini
- Subtribe: Satyrina
- Genus: Karanasa; Moore, 1893

= Karanasa =

Genus of insects

Karanasa is an Old World genus of subfamily Satyrinae (family Nymphalidae).

== Species ==
In alphabetical order:

- Karanasa abramovi (Erschoff, 1884)
- Karanasa alpherakyi Avinov, 1910
- Karanasa bolorica (Grum-Grshimailo, 1888)
- Karanasa decolorata (Staudinger, 1901)
- Karanasa hoffmanni (Christoph, 1893)
- Karanasa huebneri (C. & R. Felder, [1867])
- Karanasa incerta Bogdanov, 1997
- Karanasa josephi (Staudinger, 1882)
- Karanasa kasakstana O. Bang-Haas, 1936
- Karanasa kirgisorum Avinov et Sweadner, 1951
- Karanasa latifasciata (Grum-Grshimailo, 1902)
- Karanasa leechi (Grum-Grshimailo, 1890)
- Karanasa maureri Avinov & Sweadner, 1951
- Karanasa modesta Moore, 1893
- Karanasa moorei (Evans, 1912)
- Karanasa pamira (Staudinger, 1887)
- Karanasa puengeleri A. Bang-Haas, 1910
- Karanasa regeli (Alpheraky, 1881)
- Karanasa straminea Bogdanov, 1997
- Karanasa talastauana O. Bang-Haas, 1927
- Karanasa tancrei (Grum-Grshimailo, 1898)
- Karanasa wilkinsi (Erschoff, 1884)
