= Darvoz Range =

Mountain range in Tajikistan

- Darvaz Range
- Location within Tajikistan

Highest point
- Peak: Arnavad Peak
- Elevation: 6,083 m (19,957 ft)
- Coordinates: 38°34′00″N 71°31′00″E

Dimensions
- Length: 200 km (120 mi) NE/SW
- Width: 50 km (31 mi) NW/SE

Naming
- Native name: Қаторкӯҳи Дарвоз (Tajik)

Geography
- Country: Tajikistan
- Region: Gorno-Badakhshan
- Parent range: Pamir Mountains

Geology
- Rock age: Paleozoic
- Rock type(s): Granite and metamorphic schist

The Darvoz Range or Darvaz Range (Tajik: Қаторкӯҳи Дарвоз, Russian: Дарва́зский хребе́т) is a mountain range in the Western Pamirs, in Gorno-Badakhshan Autonomous Region of Tajikistan. Its name derives from the historical region of Darvaz.

== Geography ==
Starting near the Academy of Sciences Range by Mount Garmo, it stretches roughly southwestwards between the Vanj River and Panj River (following the flows of the two), and the Khingob (Obikhingou), a left tributary of the Vakhsh River. The Vanj River separates it from the Vanj Range. Roughly 750 km^{2} of the mountain chain are glaciated.

The highest summit of the range is Arnavad Peak (Qullai Arnavad), a 6083 m high ultra-prominent peak.

Pamir Mountains. Darvoz is in the center of the upper left quadrant

== See also ==
- List of mountains of Tajikistan
- List of Ultras of Central Asia
