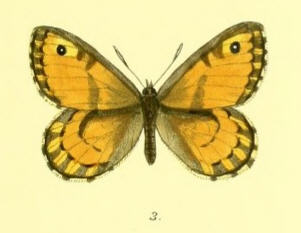

Scientific classification
- Kingdom: Animalia
- Phylum: Arthropoda
- Clade: Pancrustacea
- Class: Insecta
- Order: Lepidoptera
- Family: Nymphalidae
- Genus: Karanasa
- Species: K. huebneri

Binomial name
- Karanasa huebneri (C. & R. Felder, [1867])

Synonyms
- Satyrus huebneri C. & R. Felder, [1867]; Satyrus hübneri C. & R. Felder, [1867]; Karanasa hubneri

= Karanasa huebneri =

Species of butterfly

Karanasa huebneri is a butterfly species belonging to the family Nymphalidae. It is found in northern Pakistan and India.

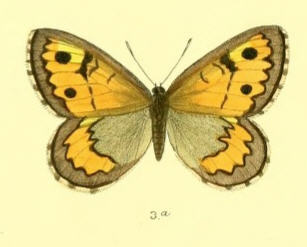
