= Karanasa moorei =

Scientific classification
- Domain: Eukaryota
- Kingdom: Animalia
- Phylum: Arthropoda
- Class: Insecta
- Order: Lepidoptera
- Family: Nymphalidae
- Genus: Karanasa
- Species: K. moorei

Binomial name
- Karanasa moorei (Evans, 1912)

Synonyms
- Satyrus moorei Evans, 1912

Species of butterfly

Karanasa moorei is a butterfly of the family Nymphalidae. It is found in north-western India and Afghanistan.

== Subspecies ==
- Karanasa moorei moorei (north-western India: Chitral)
- Karanasa moorei dubia Avinoff & Sweadner, 1951 (north-western India: Gilgit, Chitral)
- Karanasa moorei gilgitica Tytler, 1926 (north-western India: Gilgit)
- Karanasa moorei haarlovi Avinoff & Sweadner, 1951 (Afghanistan: western Hindu Kush)
