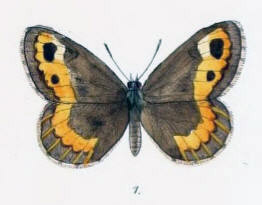

Scientific classification
- Domain: Eukaryota
- Kingdom: Animalia
- Phylum: Arthropoda
- Class: Insecta
- Order: Lepidoptera
- Family: Nymphalidae
- Genus: Karanasa
- Species: K. modesta

Binomial name
- Karanasa modesta Moore, 1893

= Karanasa modesta =

Species of butterfly

Karanasa modesta is a butterfly of the family Nymphalidae. It is found in India.

== Subspecies ==
- Karanasa modesta modesta (north-western India (Deosai Plains))
- Karanasa modesta gemina Avinoff & Sweadner, 1951 (Punjab Himalayas)
- Karanasa modesta baltorensis Avinoff & Sweadner, 1951 (north-western India (Baltistan))
