= Peter I Range =

Mountain range in Tajikistan

Peter I Range Хребет Пётра I
- Location within Tajikistan

Highest point
- Peak: Moscow Peak
- Elevation: 6,785 m (22,260 ft)
- Coordinates: 39°0′N 71°30′E

Dimensions
- Length: 200 km (120 mi) E/W
- Width: 40 km (25 mi) N/S

Geography
- Country: Tajikistan
- Parent range: Pamir Mountains

Geology
- Rock age: Mesozoic/Cenozoic
- Rock type(s): Sandstone and conglomerate

Peter I Range, Peter the First Range or Peter the Great Range (Russian: Хребет Пётра I or Хребет Пётра Первого) is a mountain range in Tajikistan, part of the Pamir Mountain System. The range takes its name from Peter the Great (1672–1725).

== Geography ==
Peter I Range is located in the south-east of Jirgatol district in Tajikistan's Region of Republican Subordination. It forms a westerly extension of the northern Pamirs, separating the watersheds of the Surchob in the north and the Obikhingou river in the south. The range stretches in a roughly east–west direction for about 200 km, connecting with the Academy of Sciences Range at its eastern end.

=== Peaks ===
Its highest summit is Moscow Peak (6,785 m). Other peaks are Leningrad Peak (6,507 m), Abalakov Peak (6,446 m), Oshanin Peak (6,389 m), Kirov Peak (6,372 m), Kuybyshev Peak (6,189 m), and the ultra-prominent Agasis Peak (5,877 m).

== See also ==
- List of mountains in Tajikistan
