= Independence Mountain (Summit County, Colorado) =

Mountain in Colorado, United States

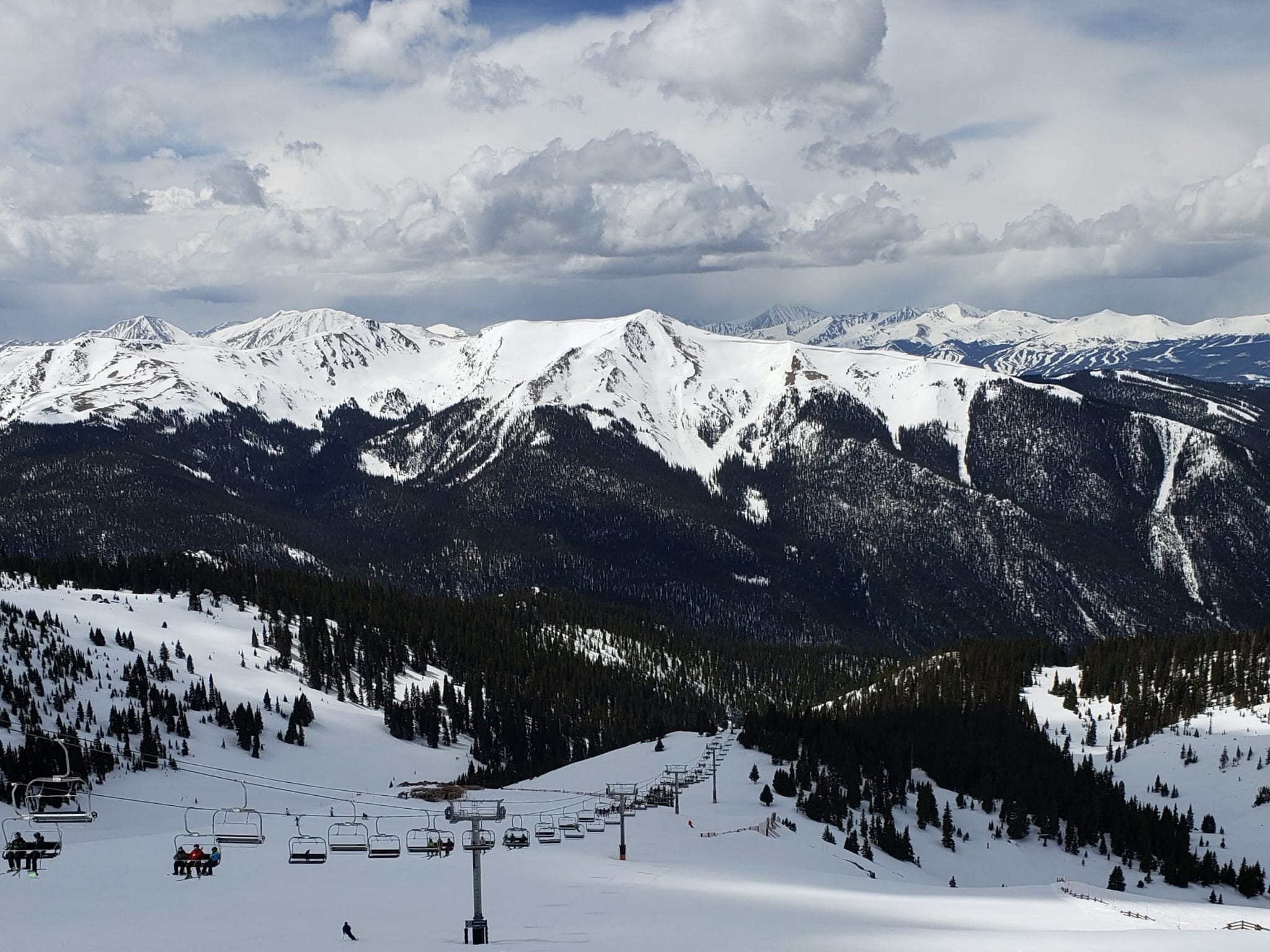
- Independence Mountain as seen from Arapahoe Basin Ski Area

Highest point
- Elevation: 12,625 ft (3,848 m)
- Coordinates: 39°34′53.86″N 105°54′36.32″W

Geography
- Location within Colorado
- Location: Dillon, Summit County, Colorado, U.S.
- Parent range: Front Range
- Topo map: USGS Keystone

Independence Mountain is a mountain near Keystone in Summit County, Colorado. Keystone Resort is located partially on the southwestern slopes of the mountain. Dercum Mountain is located to the west of Independence Mountain, and Bear Mountain is located to the south.

Independence Mountain was considered as a candidate for the alpine skiing downhill event for the 1976 Winter Olympic Games, due to its excellent snow conditions.
