= Ismoil Somoni Peak =

Highest mountain in Tajikistan

- Stalin Peak, Communism Peak
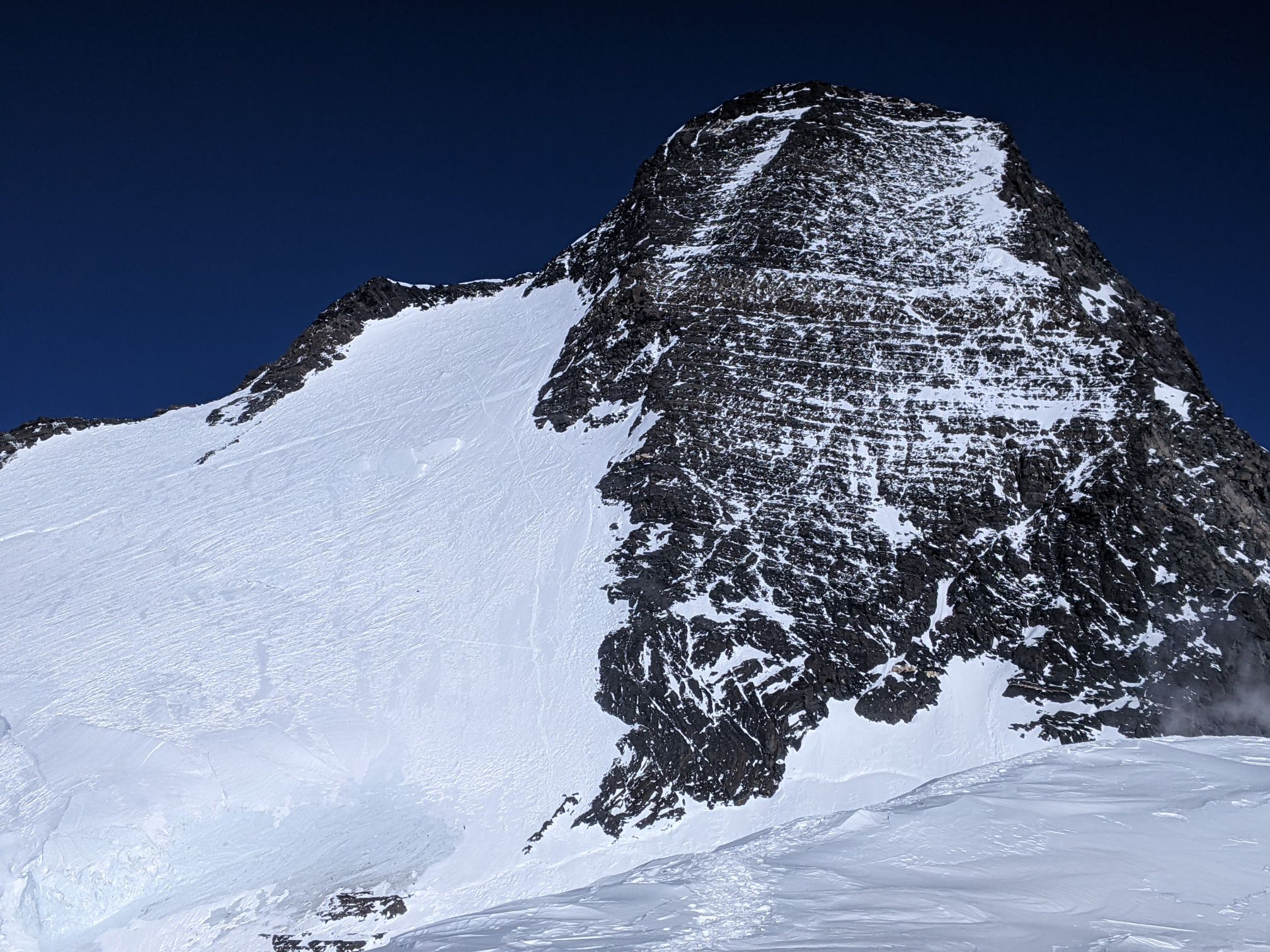
- Ismoil Somoni Peak (also known as Pik Kommunizma) in 2023

Highest point
- Elevation: 7,495 m (24,590 ft); Ranked 50th
- Prominence: 3,402 m (11,161 ft); Ranked 54th
- Listing: Country high point Ultra
- Coordinates: 38°56′36″N 72°00′58″E

Geography
- Location within Tajikistan
- Location: Northwestern Gorno-Badakhshan, Tajikistan
- Parent range: Pamirs

Climbing
- First ascent: 3 September 1933 by Yevgeniy Abalakov and Nikolay Gorbunov.
- Easiest route: rock/snow/ice climb

Ismoil Somoni Peak (Tajik: Қуллаи Исмоили Сомонӣ, romanized: Qulla-i Ismō‘il-i Sōmōnî/Qullaji Ismojili Somonī; Russian: пик Исмои́ла Сомони́, romanized: pik Ismoíla Somoní) is the highest mountain in Tajikistan, as well as the former Russian Empire and Soviet Union before Tajikistan's independence. The mountain is named after Ismail Samani, a ruler of the Samanid Empire. It is located in the Pamir Range.

== Name ==
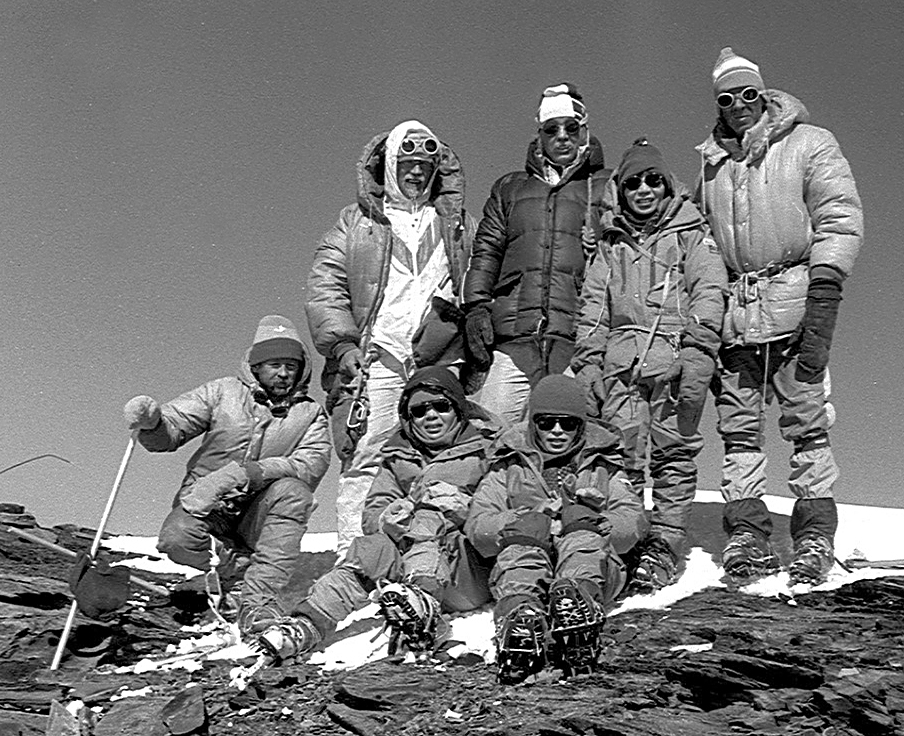
Junko Tabei on Communism Peak in 1985 together with two other Japanese and four Estonian mountaineers. Photo by Jaan Künnap.

When the existence of a peak in the Soviet Pamir Mountains higher than Lenin Peak was first established in 1928, the mountain was tentatively identified with Mount Garmo. However, as the result of the work of further Soviet expeditions, it became clear by 1932 that they were not the same, and in 1933 the new peak, in the Academy of Sciences Range, was named Stalin Peak (Russian: Пик Ста́лина, romanized: Pik Stálina), after Joseph Stalin. In 1962, as part of Khrushchev's nationwide de-Stalinization process, the name was changed to Communism Peak (Tajik: Пики Коммунизм, romanized: Piki Komunizm Russian: Пик Коммуни́зма, romanized: Pik Kommunízma), a name by which it is still commonly known. The name Communism Peak was officially dropped in 1998 in favour of the current name, commemorating the 9th-10th century Samanid emir, Ismail Samani.

== History ==
By the end of the 1880s, a Russian expedition, led by V.F. Oshanin, conducted research and named various regions in the area. He noted in his diary: "I believe that the eastern peak has a height of up to 25,000 feet (7,600 metres)." The central Pamirs would continue to be visited by the expeditions of Kosineko, Korzhenevsky, Lipsky, Novitsky, Musketov, and others, but they failed to reach the Academy of Sciences Range.

In 1913, the central part of the Pamirs was explored by an expedition led by the German mountain explorer and climber Willi Rickmer Rickmers. The expedition penetrated the upper reaches of the Obikhingou River, where they saw a 6650 m peak. It was given the name Garmo Peak, according to the name given by the Tajiks from Pashimgar. Subsequent expeditions to the area of the Range of the Academy of Sciences took place in Soviet times.

In 1928, the long-term Tajik-Pamir expedition of the Academy of Sciences of the Soviet Union began to operate, which began with the Soviet-German expedition with the participation of Willi Rickmers. As a result of topographic survey, it was found that one of the peaks visible in the west of the Fedchenko glaciers reaches a height of 7495 m. Having compared the survey results with a schematic map compiled by Korzhenevsky back in 1925, and with other data, the members of the expedition of the Academy of Sciences decided that this peak is Garmo Peak, which was mapped by the German expedition of 1913. However, this led to the "mystery of the Garmo", as there was a discrepancy between the heights: 6650 m and 7495 m. This was solved only during the expeditions of 1931 and 1932, when two detachments of climbers and topographers (led by Gorbunov and Krylenko) penetrated the area from the east and from the west. The 6650 m peak was determined to be the real Garmo, and the unnamed 7495 m peak was conclusively discovered and mapped, and given the name Stalin Peak in honor of Stalin's upcoming 55th birthday.

The first ascent (to the then Stalin Peak) was made on 3 September 1933 by the Soviet mountaineer Yevgeniy Abalakov, during the Tajik-Pamir expedition of 1933, alongside the politician, chemist and mountaineer Nikolai Gorbunov.

The first woman to ascend to the peak was Lyudmila Agranovskaya in 1969.

The first winter ascent was made in February 1986 by 24 climbers (7 from Uzbekistan, and 17 from the rest of the USSR).

== See also ==
- List of highest mountains on Earth
- Peak Ozodi
- Patkhor Peak
- List of elevation extremes by country
- Extreme points of Tajikistan
