= Patkhor Peak =

Mountain in Tajikistan

- Location within Tajikistan

Highest point
- Elevation: 6,083 m (19,957 ft)
- Prominence: 1,963 m (6,440 ft)
- Listing: Ultra
- Coordinates: 37°53′21″N 72°11′21″E

Geography
- Location: Gorno-Badakhshan, Tajikistan
- Parent range: Rushan Range, Pamir Mountains

Patkhor Peak (Russian: пик Патхор; Tajik: қуллаи Паххор) is a mountain in Tajikistan's Gorno-Badakhshan Autonomous Province. At 6,083 metres (19,957 ft) it is the highest point in the Rushan Range, a subrange of the Pamir Mountains.

== See also ==
- List of Ultras of Central Asia
