= Yazgulem Range =

Mountain range in Tajikistan

Yazgulem Range Язгулемский хребет
- Location within Tajikistan

Highest point
- Peak: Independence Peak (Qullai Istiqlol)
- Elevation: 6,974 m (22,881 ft)
- Coordinates: 38°30′36″N 72°21′15″E

Naming
- Native name: Қаторкӯҳи Язғулом (Tajik)

Geography
- Country: Tajikistan
- Parent range: Pamir Mountains

Geology
- Rock type(s): shale, sandstone, limestone and granite

Yazgulem Range (Note: Tajik: Қаторкӯҳи Язғулом, romanized: Qatorko‘hi Yazg‘ulom; Russian: Язгулемский хребет) is a mountain range of the western Pamir Mountains.

It is located in Tajikistan's Gorno-Badakhshan Autonomous Province stretches for about 170 km between the Yazgulyam River and the Bartang River in the western Pamirs. The range rises in a north-eastern direction from the border with Afghanistan toward its highest elevation at Independence Peak (6,974 m). The average elevation ranges between 4,500 and 6,000 m. Glaciers cover about 630 km^{2} of the range, including the Fedchenko Glacier stretching northwards.

== See also ==
- List of mountains in Tajikistan
