= Yazghulom =

Location
- Country: Tajikistan

Physical characteristics
- Source
  - coordinates: 38.4884°N 72.1000°E
- Mouth: Panj
  - coordinates: 38.1856°N 71.3658°E
- Length: 80 km (50 mi)
- Basin size: 1,970 km^{2} (760 sq mi)

Basin features
- Progression: Panj→ Amu Darya→ Aral Sea

The Yazghulom (/ˌjæzɡʊˈlɒm/ YAZ-guu-LOM) (Note: Tajik: Язғулом, romanized: Yazg‘ulom, IPA: [jɐzʁʊˈlɔm]; Yazghulami: Зѓаменҷ Zǵamenj [zɟɐˈmend͡ʒ]) is a river in Vanj district, western Gorno-Badakhshan, Tajikistan. It is a right tributary of the Panj (upper Oxus). The river is 80 kilometres (50 mi) long and has a basin area of 1,970 square kilometres (760 mi^{2}).

It flows in a narrow valley or gorge from northeast to southwest, between two high mountain ranges, the Vanj Range to the north and the Yazgulem Range to the south. Its headwaters are near the Fedchenko Glacier. Settlements in the valley include Motrawn, Budun, Andarbag and Zhamag. The Yazghulami inhabitants number about 4,000 (as of 1990, estimate for 1940 is about 2,000).

In 1996 during the Tajik civil war, there was some fighting in Yazghulom Gorge between Yazghulami mujahiddin and Tajik troops.
