= Independence Peak =

Mountain in Tajikistan

- Revolution Peak
- Location within Tajikistan

Highest point
- Elevation: 6,940 m (22,770 ft)
- Prominence: 2,402 m (7,881 ft)
- Listing: Ultra
- Coordinates: 38°30′36″N 72°21′15″E

Geography
- Location: GBAO, Tajikistan
- Parent range: Pamir Mountains

Climbing
- First ascent: 1954, by A. Ugarov et al.
- Easiest route: glacier/snow climb

Independence Peak or Qullai Istiqlol (Russian: Пик Независимости; Tajik: Қуллаи Истиқлол), at 6,940 m (22,769 ft), is the seventh-highest peak in the Pamir Mountains, located at the center of Tajikistan's Gorno-Badakhshan Autonomous Province, above the source of the Yazgulem River in the Yazgulem Range. The mountain consists of three snow- and ice-covered summits and its northwest face is the source of the Fedchenko Glacier.

The peak was originally named Dreispitz by a joint Russian–German team who discovered it in 1928, but failed to climb it due to deep snow and avalanche danger. The first ascent was made in 1954 by a Russian team led by A. Ugarov. After World War II, Dreispitz was renamed Revolution Peak (Tajik: Қуллаи Инқилоб, Qullai Inkilob), and in July 2006 it was given its current name.

== See also ==
- List of Ultras of Central Asia
