= Pamir Mountains =

Mountain range in Central Asia

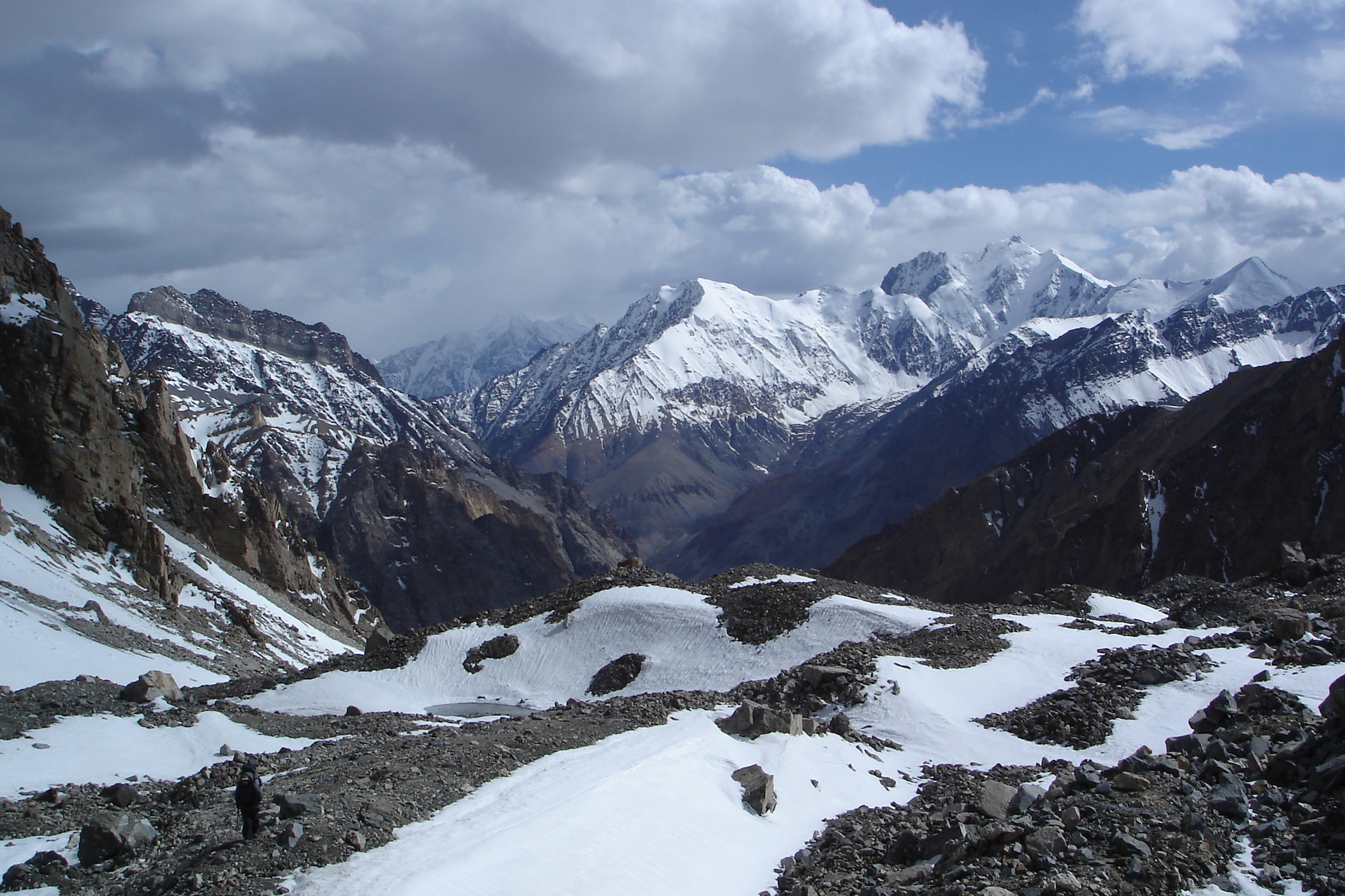
- Pamir Mountains

Highest point
- Peak: Kongur Tagh
- Elevation: 7,649 m (25,095 ft)
- Coordinates: 38°35′39″N 75°18′48″E

Geography
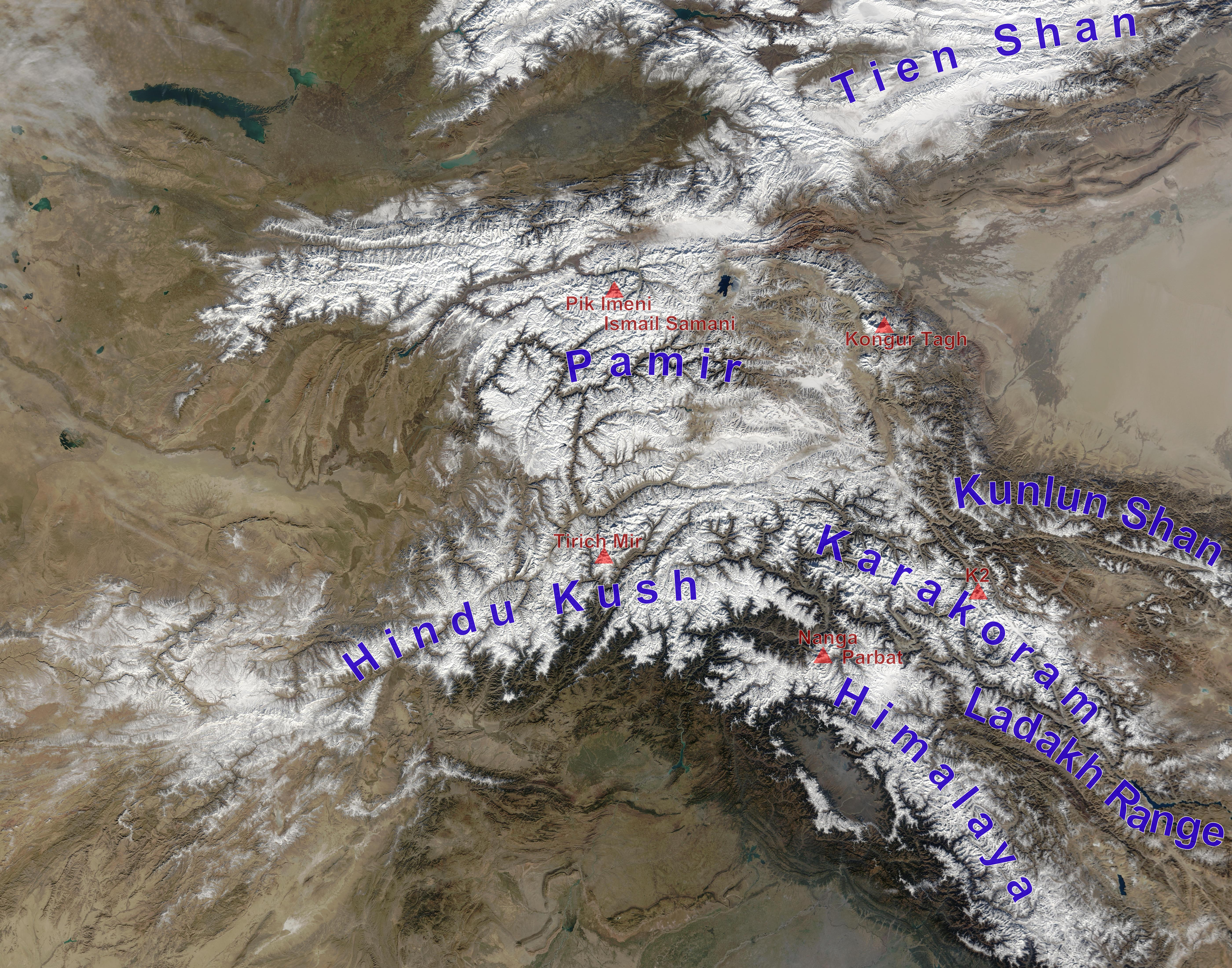
- Countries: Tajikistan; Kyrgyzstan; Afghanistan; China; Pakistan
- States/Provinces: Gorno-Badakhshan; Osh Region; Wakhan; Chitral; Gilgit Baltistan; Xinjiang (Note: Also claimed by the Republic of China on Taiwan as part of Sinkiang Province.)
- Range coordinates: 38.5°N 73.5°E

The Pamir Mountains are a mountain range in Central Asia and South Asia. They are located at a junction with other notable mountain ranges, namely the Tian Shan, the Karakoram, the Kunlun, the Hindu Kush, and the Himalayas. They are among the world's highest mountains.

Much of the range lies in the Gorno-Badakhshan region of Tajikistan. Spanning the border parts of four countries, to the south, they border the Hindu Kush mountains along Afghanistan's Wakhan Corridor in Badakhshan Province and Chitral and Gilgit-Baltistan regions of Pakistan. To the north, they join the Tian Shan mountains along the Alay Valley of Kyrgyzstan. To the east, they extend to the range that includes China's Kongur Tagh, in the "Eastern Pamirs", separated by the Yarkand valley from the Kunlun Mountains.

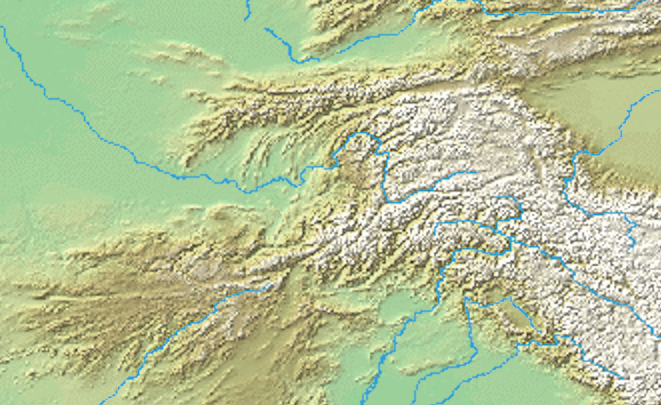
Pamir as seen from the map, as well as the Amu Darya river which rises from the Pamir Mountains north of the Hindu Kush and the Helmand River which is the longest river in the entire country of Afghanistan.

Since the Victorian era, they have been known as the "Roof of the World", presumably a translation from Persian.

== Names and etymology ==
=== In other languages ===
The Pamir region is home to several different cultures, peoples and languages. In some of these languages, the Pamir Mountains are referred by different names.

In Indo-European languages, they are called:

- Pomīr/Pomer/Pomīr Kūen/Pomer Kūen in Shughni;
- کوه های پامیر، Koh ha-yi Pamir in Dari Persian;
- Памир/Памирские горы/Горные вершины Памира Pamir/Pamirskiye gory/Gornye vershiny Pamira in Russian;
- پامیر غرونه Pāmīr Ghrūna in Pashto;
- رشته کوه‌های پامیر; Ришта Кӯҳҳои Помир, Rishta Kūhhoi Pomir in Tajik;
- پامیر کوهستان Pāmīr Kohistān in Urdu;
- सुमेरु Sumeru in Sanskrit.

In Turkic languages, they are called:

- پامىر توولورۇ, Памир Тоолору, Pamir Tooloru in Kyrgyz;
- پامىر ئېگىزلىكى, Pamir Ëgizliki, Памир Егизлики in Uyghur.

In Old and Middle Chinese, they are referred as "Onion Range" (simplified Chinese: 葱岭; traditional Chinese: 蔥嶺; pinyin: Cōnglǐng; Wade–Giles: Ts'ung-ling), which is named after the wild onions growing in the region; In the Dungan dialect of Mandarin, it is written Памир / Цунлин in the Cyrillic alphabet, and in Xiao'erjing it is written پَامِعَر / ڞوْلٍْ. The name "Pamir" is used more commonly in Modern Chinese and loaned as 帕米尔 / 帕米爾 Pàmǐ'ěr.

=== Geological term ===
According to Middleton and Thomas, "pamir" is also a geological term. A pamir is a flat plateau or U-shaped valley surrounded by mountains. It forms when a glacier or ice field melts leaving a rocky plain. A pamir lasts until erosion forms soil and cuts down normal valleys. This type of terrain is found in the east and north of the Wakhan, and the east and south of Gorno-Badakhshan, as opposed to the valleys and gorges of the west. Pamirs are used for summer pasture.

The Great Pamir is around Lake Zorkul. The Little Pamir is east of this in the far east of Wakhan. The Taghdumbash Pamir is between Tashkurgan and the Wakhan west of the Karakoram Highway. The Alichur Pamir is around Yashil Kul on the Gunt River. The Sarez Pamir is around the town of Murghab, Tajikistan. The Khargush Pamir is south of Lake Karakul. There are several others.

The Pamir River is in the south-west of the Pamirs.

== Geography ==
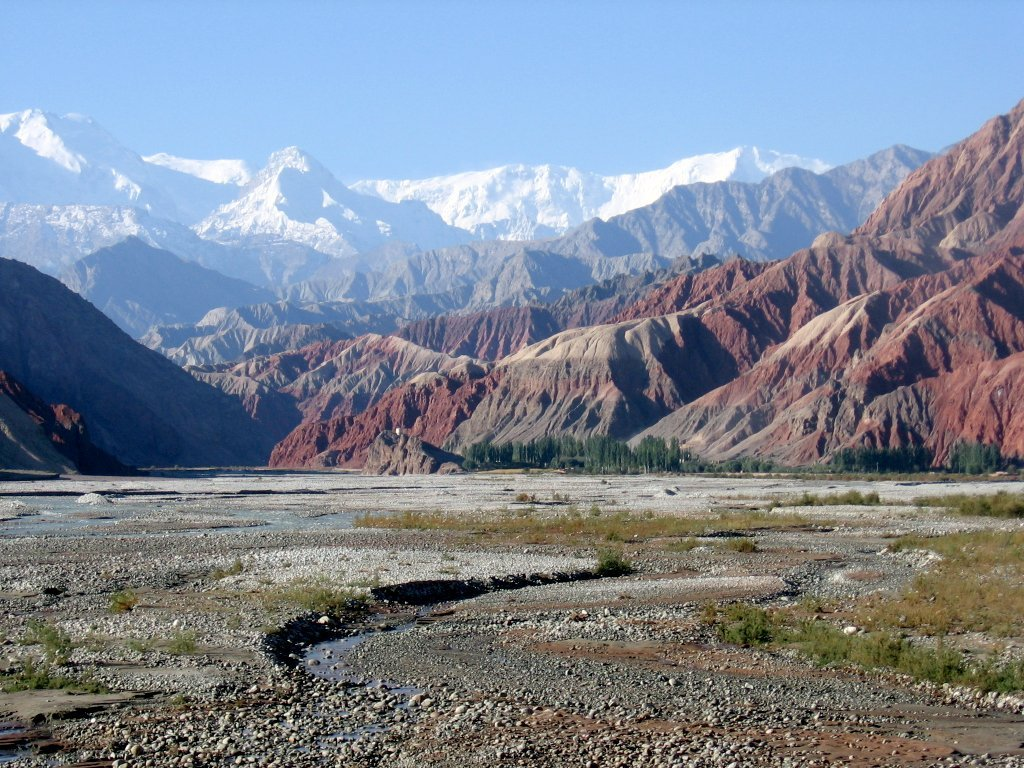
Kongur Tagh (left) and Kongur Tiube (slightly to the right) as seen from the Karakoram Highway

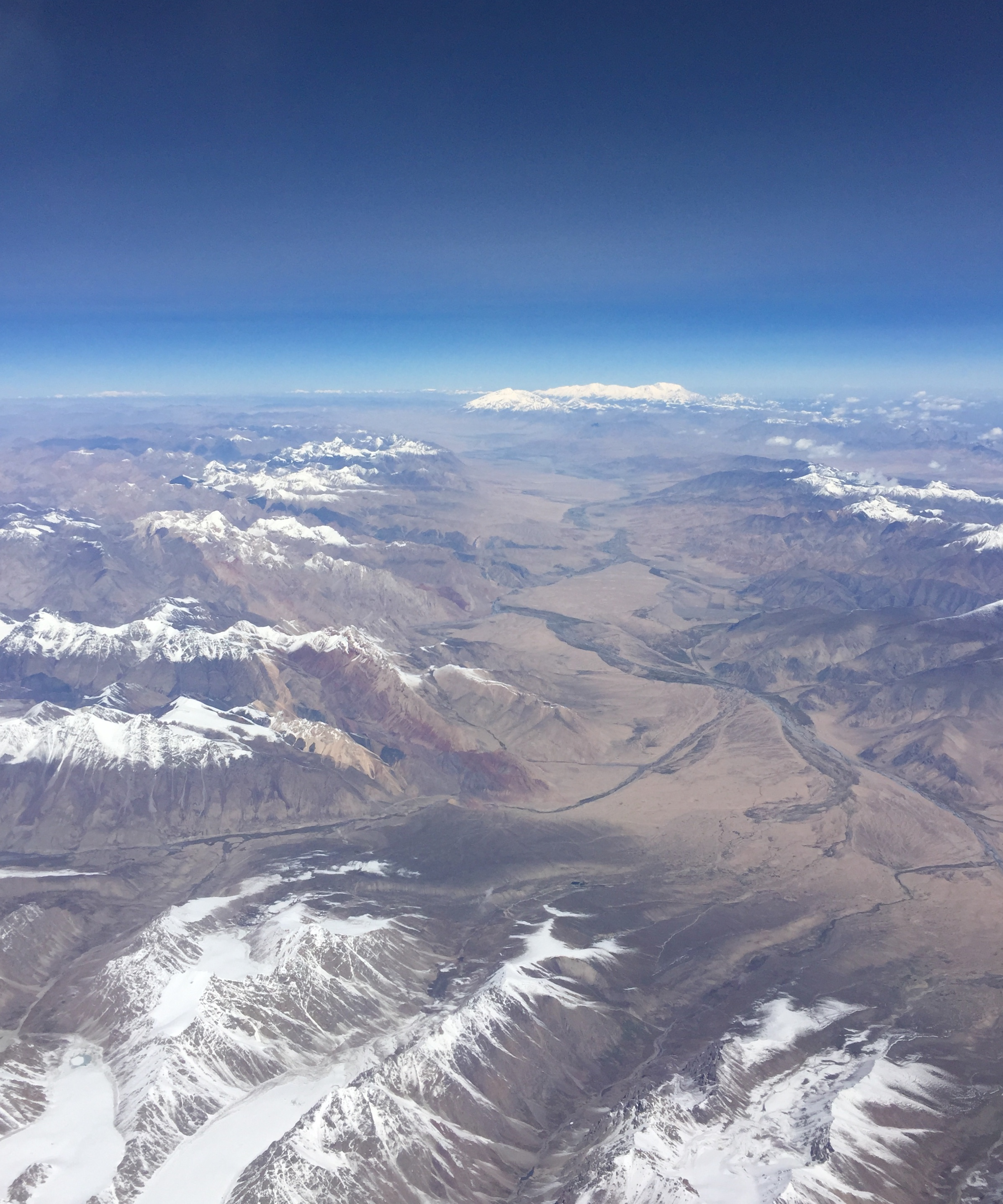
Slopes of Pamir Mountains on the Chinese side and Muztagh Ata

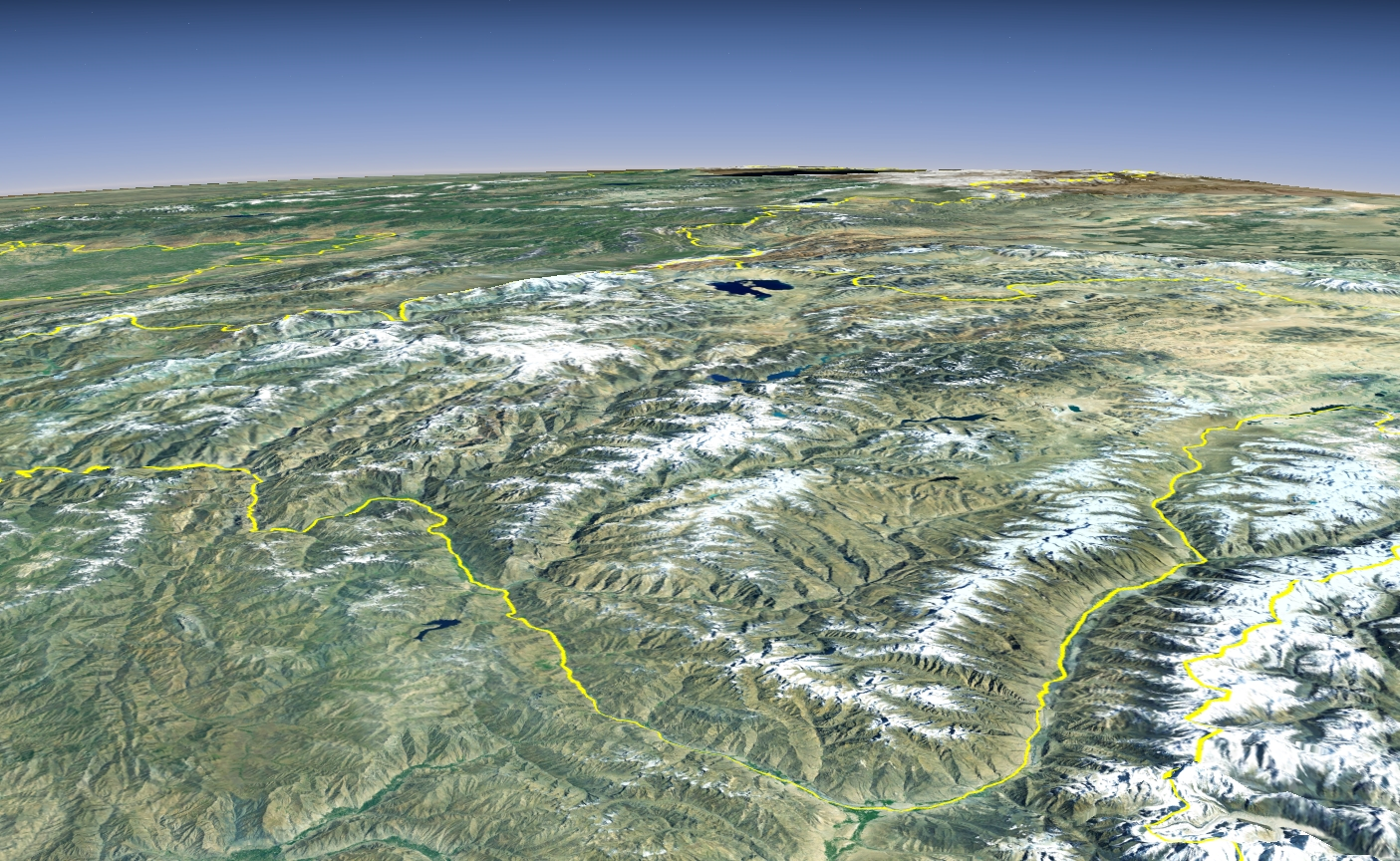
Pamir Mountains as seen in NASA WorldWind, April 2012

=== Mountain ===
The three highest mountains in the Pamirs core are Ismoil Somoni Peak (known from 1932 to 1962 as Stalin Peak, and from 1962 to 1998 as Communism Peak), 7,495 m (24,590 ft); Ibn Sina Peak (still officially known as Lenin Peak in Kyrgyzstan), 7,134 m (23,406 ft); and Peak Korzhenevskaya (Russian: Пик Корженевская, Pik Korzhenevskoi), 7,105 m (23,310 ft). In the Eastern Pamirs, China's Kongur Tagh is the highest at 7,649 m (25,095 ft).

Among the significant peaks of the Pamir Mountains are the following:

Native name(s)	Translated name(s)	Height in meters	Coord.	Sub-range	Country
Qoʻngʻir Tog (Uzbek) قوڭۇر تاغ (Uyghur); Хонгор Таг (Mongolian) ཀོང་གེལ་རི་རྩེ། (Standard Tibetan) 公格尔峰 (Chinese)	Kongur (Kungur Tagh)	7,649	(38.593428°N 75.312560°E)	Kongur Shan	China
مۇزتاغ ئاتا (Uyghur); Muztog Ota (Uzbek) མུཛ་ཏག་རི་རྩེ། (Standard Tibetan) 慕士塔格峰 (Chinese)	Muztagh Ata	7,546	(38.275855°N 75.1161°E)	Muztagh Ata Massif	China
قوڭۇر تۆپە (Uyghur) 公格尔九别峰 (Chinese)	Kongur Jiubie (Kungur Tjube Tagh)	7,530	(38.615833°N 75.195833°E)	Kongur Shan	China
Пик Исмои́ла Сомони́ (Russian); Қуллаи Исмоили Сомонӣ (Tajik)	Ismoil Somoni Peak (formerly Communism Peak, Stalin Peak)	7,495	(38.943422°N 72.015803°E)	Academy of Sciences Range	Tajikistan
Пик Ленина (Russian); Ленин Чокусу (Kyrgyz); Қуллаи Ленин (former name); Қуллаи Абӯалӣ ибни Сино (Tajik)	Lenin Peak (new name: Abu Ali Ibn Sino Peak; formerly Kaufmann Peak)	7,134	(39.343724°N 72.877536°E)	Trans-Alay Range	Tajikistan, Kyrgyzstan
Пик Корженевской/Озоди (Russian); Қуллаи Корженевская/Озоди (Tajik)	Peak Ozodi (formerly Peak Korzhenevskoi)	7,105	(39.057317°N 72.00983°E)	Academy of Sciences Range	Tajikistan
Пик Независимости (Russian); Қуллаи Истиқлол (Tajik)	Independence Peak (also Qullai Istiqlol, formerly Revolution Peak, Dreispitz)	6,940	(38.51°N 72.354167°E)	Yazgulem Range	Tajikistan
Пик Россия (Russian); Қуллаи Россия (Tajik)	Russia Peak	6,875	(38.896°N 72.029°E)	Academy of Sciences Range	Tajikistan
Пик Москва (Russian); Қуллаи Москва (Tajik)	Moscow Peak	6,785	(38.948563°N 71.8344°E)	Peter I Range	Tajikistan
Пик Карла Маркса (Russian); Қуллаи Карл Маркс (Tajik)	Karl Marx Peak	6,723	(37.1625°N 72.481667°E)	Shakhdara Range	Tajikistan
Курумды (Russian); Курумды (Tajik)	Kurumdy Mountain	6,614	(39.455812°N 73.566978°E)	Trans-Alay Range	Tajikistan, Kyrgyzstan
Пик Гармо (Russian); Қуллаи Гармо (Tajik)	Mount Garmo	6,595	(38.810955°N 72.072344°E)	Academy of Sciences Range	Tajikistan
Пик Энгельса (Russian); Қуллаи Энгельс (Tajik)	Engels Peak	6,510	(37.171671°N 72.522898°E)	Shakhdara Range	Tajikistan
Коҳи Памир	Kohi Pamir	6,320	(37.15°N 73.21°E)	Wakhan Range	Afghanistan
Пик советских офицеров	Peak of the Soviet Officers	6,233	(38.424°N 73.302°E)	Muzkol Range	Tajikistan
Пик Маяковского (Russian); Қуллаи Маяковский (Tajik)	Mayakovsky Peak	6,096	(37.021092°N 71.715138°E)	Shakhdara Range	Tajikistan
Пик Патхур (Russian); Қуллаи Паххор (Tajik)	Patkhor Peak	6,083	(37.889167°N 72.189167°E)	Rushan Range	Tajikistan
Пик Лейпциг	Leipzig Peak	5,725	(39.348°N 72.477°E)	Trans-Alay Range	Tajikistan, Kyrgyzstan
Пик Скалистый	Skalisty Peak (Schugnan Range)	5,707	(37.6005°N 72.227°E)	Schugnan Range	Tajikistan
Кызылдангы	Kysyldangi Peak	5,704	(37.4006°N 72.8435°E)	Southern Alitschur Range	Tajikistan

Remark: The summits of the Kongur and Muztagata Group are in some sources counted as part of the Kunlun, which would make Peak Ismoil Somoni the highest summit of the Pamir.

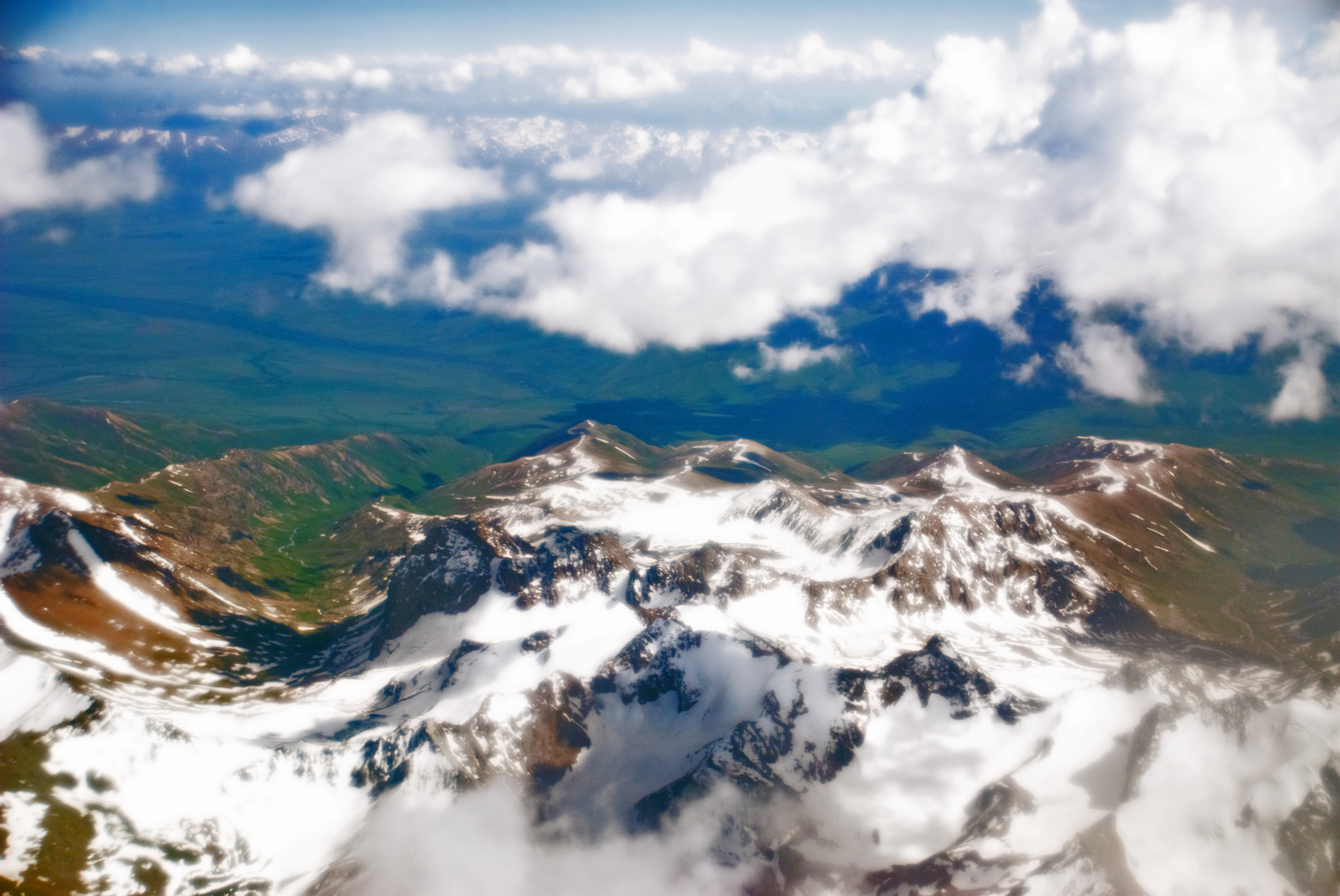
Pamir Mountains from an airplane

=== Glaciers ===
There are many glaciers in the Pamir Mountains, including the 77 km (48 mi) long Vanch-Yakh Glacier, the longest in the former USSR and the longest glacier outside the polar regions. Approximately 12,500 km^{2} (ca. 10%) of the Pamirs are glaciated. Glaciers in the Southern Pamirs are retreating rapidly. Ten percent of annual runoff is supposed to originate from retreating glaciers in the Southern Pamirs. In the North-Western Pamirs, glaciers have almost stable mass balances.

=== Climate ===
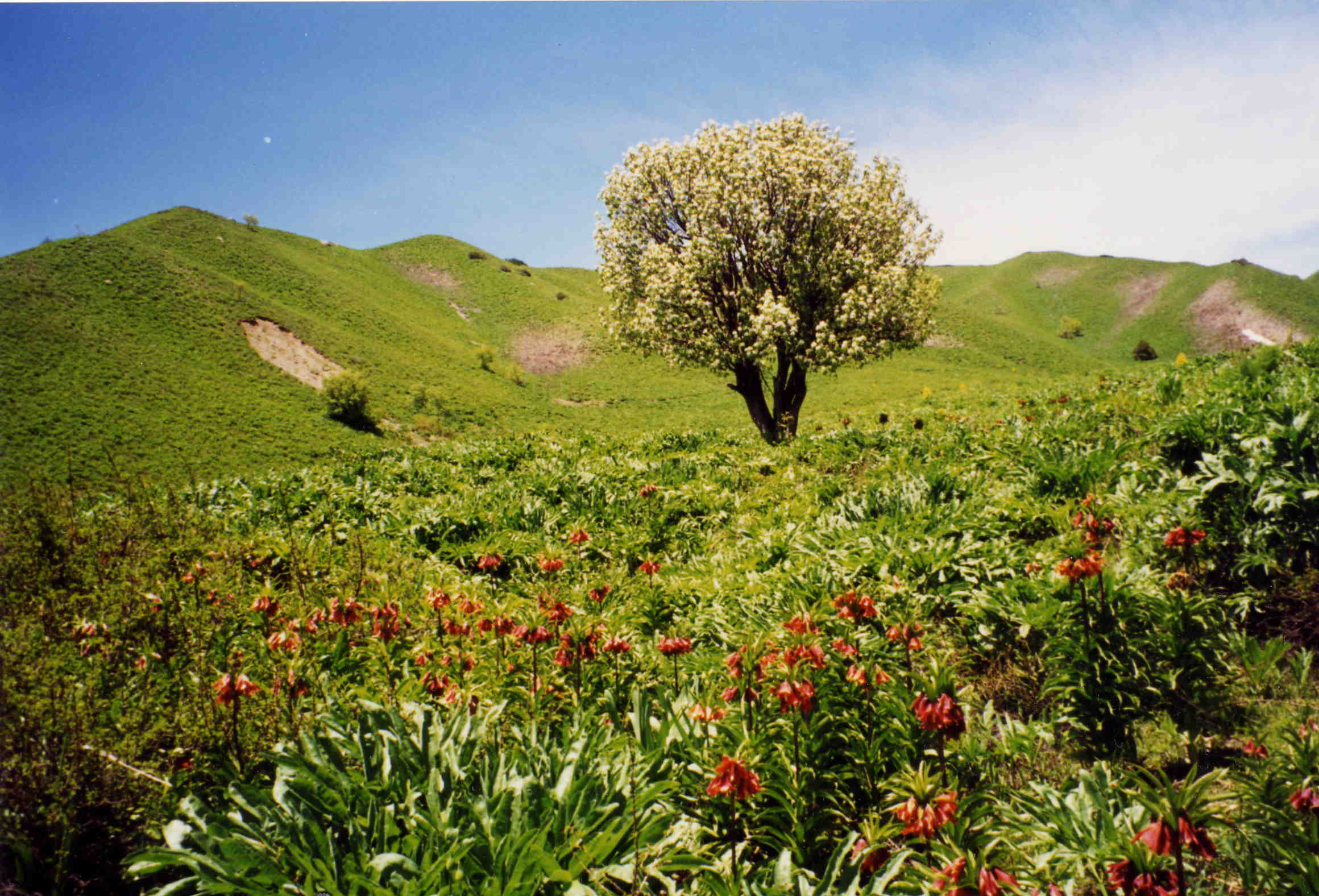
Part of the Pamir Mountain range in springtime.

Covered in snow during most of the year, the Pamirs have long and bitterly cold winters, and short, cool summers, which equals an ET (tundra climate) according to Köppen climate classification (EF above the snow line). Annual precipitation is about 130 mm (5 in), which supports grasslands but few trees.

==== Paleoclimatology during the Ice Age ====
The East-Pamir, in the centre of which the massifs of Mustagh Ata (7620 m) and Kongur Tagh (Qungur Shan, 7578, 7628 or 7830 m) are situated, shows from the western margin of the Tarim Basin an east–west extension of c. 200 km. Its north–south extension from King Ata Tagh up to the northwest Kunlun foothills amounts to c.170 km. Whilst the up to 21 km long current valley glaciers are restricted to mountain massifs exceeding 5600 m in height, during the last glacial period the glacier ice covered the high plateau with its set-up highland relief, continuing west of Mustagh Ata and Kongur. From this glacier area an outlet glacier has flowed down to the north-east through the Gez valley up to c.1850 m asl (meters above sea level) and thus as far as to the margin of the Tarim basin. This outlet glacier received inflow from the Kaiayayilak glacier from the Kongur north flank. From the north-adjacent Kara Bak Tor (Chakragil, c. 6800 or 6694 m) massif, the Oytag valley glacier in the same exposition flowed also down up to c. 1850 m asl. At glacial times the glacier snowline (ELA (Note: The snow line that separates the snow above from the firn (1 yr old snow) or bare glacier ice below is the equilibrium line altitude (ELA).)) as altitude limit between glacier nourishing area and ablation zone, was about 820 to 1250 metres lower than it is today. Under the condition of comparable proportions of precipitation there results from this a glacial depression of temperature of at least 5 to 7.5 °C.

== Economy ==
Coal is mined in the west, though sheep herding in upper meadowlands is the primary source of income for the region.

== Exploration ==
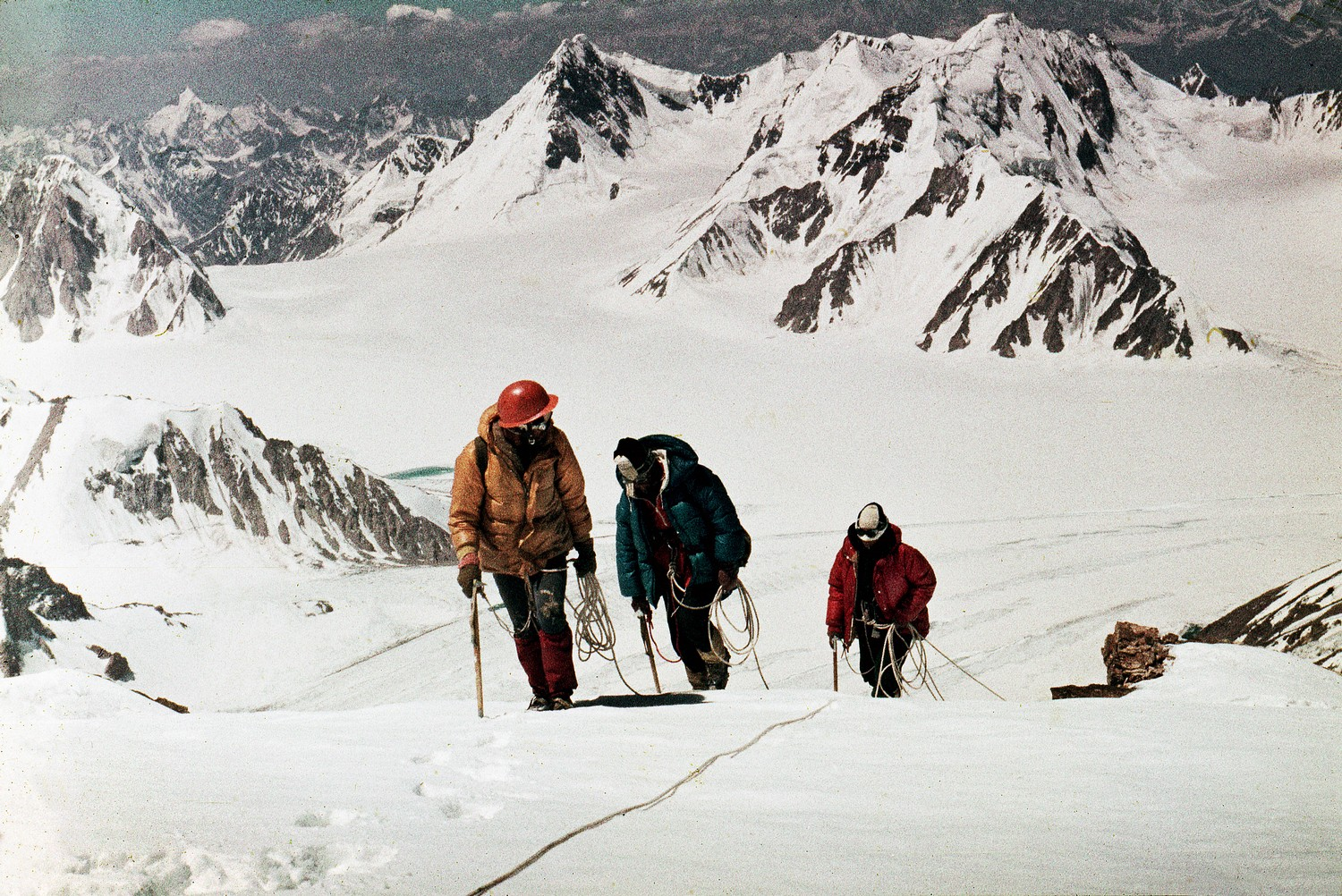
Expedition in 1982 to Tartu Ülikool 350 Peak, which was considered to be the highest unreached peak in the territory of former Soviet Union at the time.

The lapis lazuli found in Egyptian tombs is thought to come from the Pamir area in Badakhshan province of Afghanistan. About 138 BCE Zhang Qian reached the Fergana Valley northwest of the Pamirs. Ptolemy vaguely describes a trade route through the area. From about 600 CE, Buddhist pilgrims travelled on both sides of the Pamirs to reach India from China. In 747 a Tang army was on the Wakhan River. There are various Arab and Chinese reports. Marco Polo may have travelled along the Panj River. In 1602, Bento de Goes travelled from Kabul to Yarkand and left a meager report on the Pamirs. In 1838, Lieutenant John Wood reached the headwaters of the Pamir River. From about 1868 to 1880, a number of Indians in the British service secretly explored the Panj area. In 1873, the British and Russians agreed to an Afghan frontier along the Panj River. From 1871 to around 1893, several Russian military-scientific expeditions mapped out most of the Pamirs (Alexei Pavlovich Fedchenko, Nikolai Severtzov, Captain Dmitry Putyata and others. Later came Nikolai Korzhenevskiy). Several local groups asked for Russian protection from Afghan raiders. The Russians were followed by a number of non-Russians including Ney Elias, George Littledale, the Earl of Dunmore, Wilhelm Filchner and Lord Curzon who was probably the first to reach the Wakhan source of the Oxus River. In 1891, the Russians informed Francis Younghusband that he was on their territory and later escorted a Lieutenant Davidson out of the area ('Pamir Incident'). In 1892, a battalion of Russians under Mikhail Ionov entered the area and camped near the present Murghab. In 1893 they built a proper fort there (Pamirskiy Post). In 1895 their base was moved to Khorog facing the Afghans.

In 1928, the last blank areas around the Fedchenko Glacier were mapped by the German-Soviet Alay-Pamir Expedition under Willi Rickmer Rickmers.

== Discoveries ==
In the early 1980s, a deposit of gemstone-quality clinohumite was discovered in the Pamir Mountains. It was the only such deposit known until the discovery of gem-quality material in the Taymyr region of Siberia, in 2000.

The earliest known evidence of human cannabis use was found in tombs at the Jirzankal Cemetery.

== Transport ==
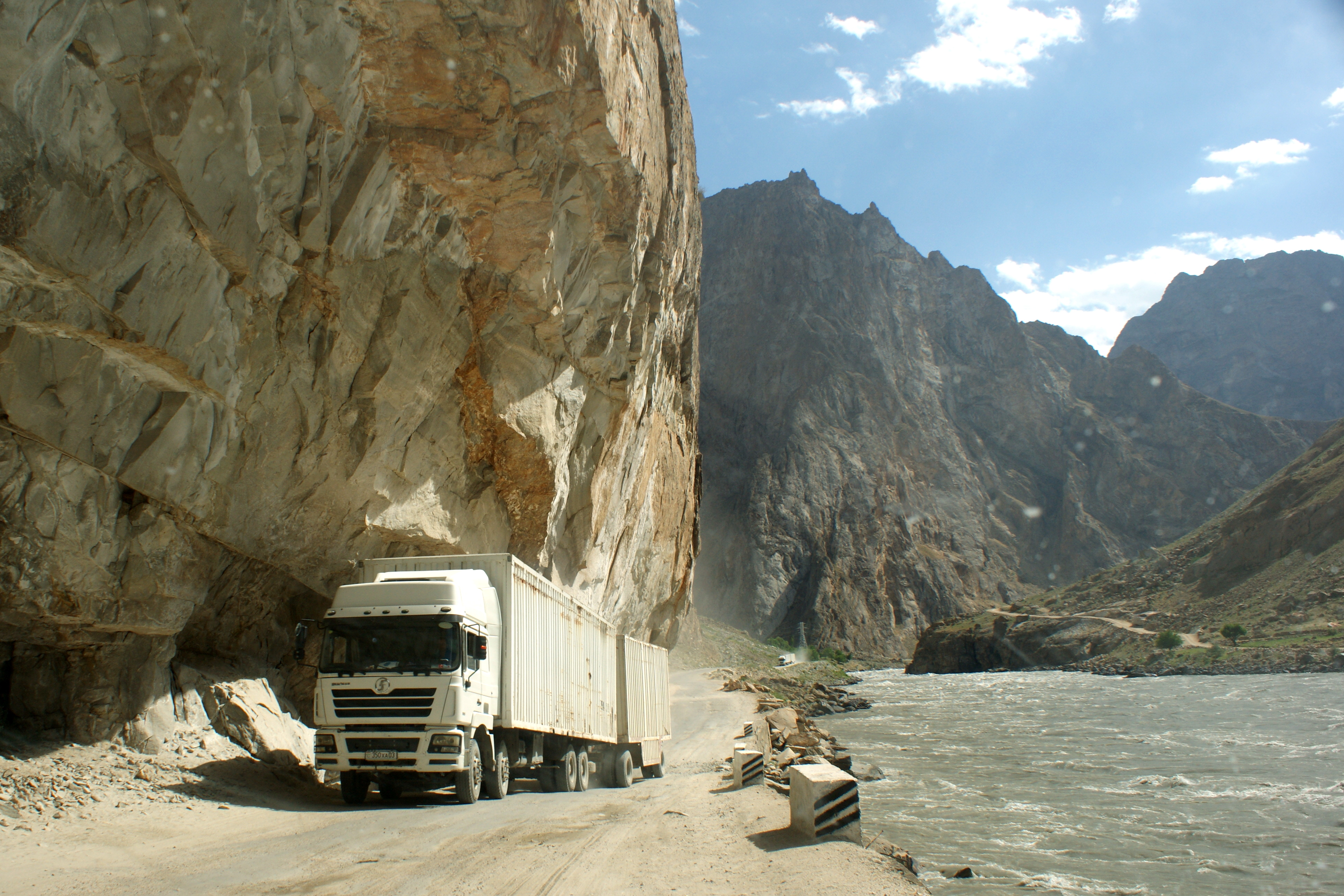
Pamir Highway

The Pamir Highway, the world's second highest international road, runs from Dushanbe in Tajikistan to Osh in Kyrgyzstan through the Gorno-Badakhshan Autonomous Province, and is the isolated region's main supply route. The Great Silk Road crossed a number of Pamir Mountain ranges.

== Tourism ==
In December 2009, the New York Times featured articles on the possibilities for tourism in the Pamir area of Tajikistan. 2013 proved to be the most successful year ever for tourism in the region and tourism development continues to be the fastest growing economic sector.

== Strategic position ==
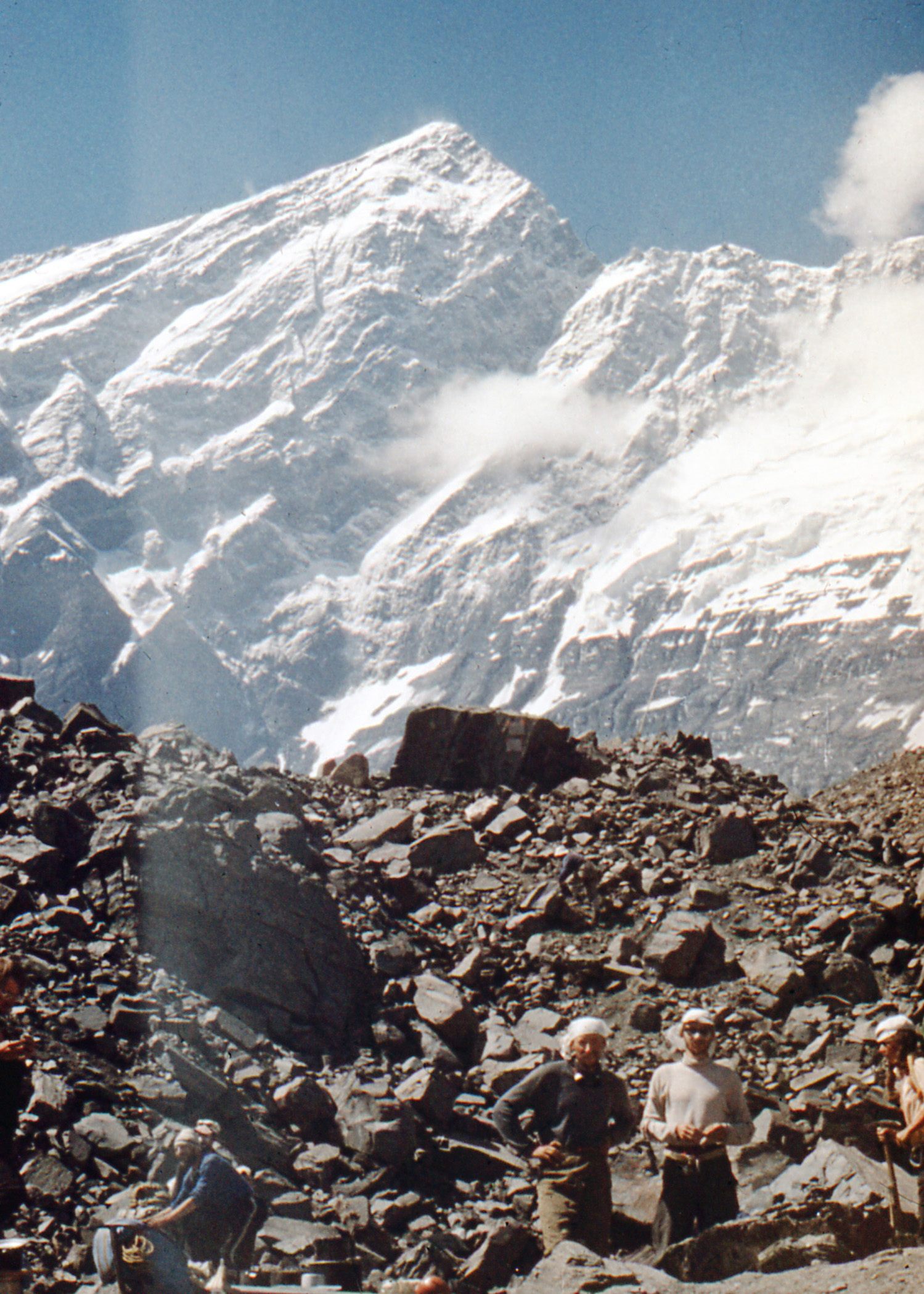
Climbers near "Peak Communism" in 1978.

Historically, the Pamir Mountains were considered a strategic trade route between Kashgar and Kokand on the Northern Silk Road, a prehistoric trackway, and have been subject to numerous territorial conquests. The Northern Silk Road (about 2,600 km (1,616 mi) in length) connected the ancient Chinese capital Chang'an with Kashgar over the Pamir Mountains towards the west, and from there continued to ancient Parthia. In the 20th century, these mountains have been the setting for the Tajikistan Civil War, border disputes between China and the Soviet Union, establishment of military bases by the US, Russia, and India, and renewed interest in trade development and resource exploration. The Chinese government says it has resolved most of the disputes it had with Central Asian countries.

== Religious symbolism ==
Some researchers identify the Pamirs with the Mount Meru or Sumeru. The Mount Meru is the sacred five-peaked mountain of Hinduism, Buddhist and Jain, and is considered to be the center of all the physical, metaphysical and spiritual universes.

== See also ==
- Tajik National Park
- Pamir languages
- Pamiris
- List of mountain ranges
- List of highest mountains
- Soviet Central Asia
- Mount Imeon
- Ak-Baital Pass
- China–Tajikistan border
- Karachukar Valley
- Barque Pamir
