= Tajik National Academy of Sciences Range =

Mountain range in Tajikistan

Tajik National Academy of Sciences Range Хребет Академии Наук Qatorkuhi Akademiyai Fanho
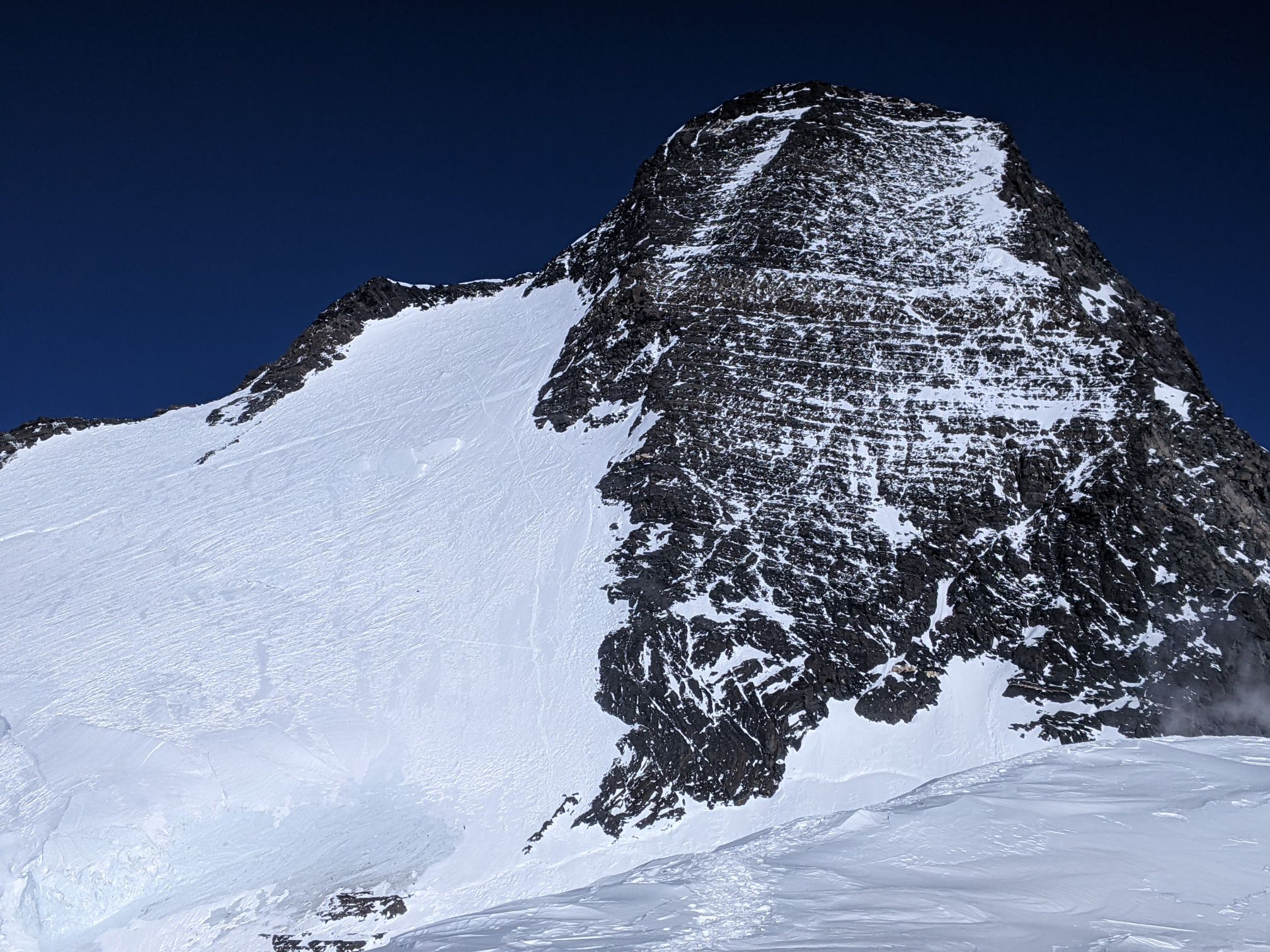

Highest point
- Peak: Ismoil Somoni Peak
- Elevation: 7,495 m (24,590 ft)
- Coordinates: 38°55′N 72°01′E

Geography
- Country: Tajikistan
- Parent range: Pamir Mountains

Geology
- Rock age: Paleozoic
- Rock type(s): sedimentary and metamorphic rocks

Tajik National Academy of Sciences Range (Russian: Хребет Национальной академии наук Таджикистана, Tajik: Қаторкӯҳи Академияи миллии илмҳои Тоҷикистон; until 31 July, 2023 Academy of Sciences Range) is a mountain range in the Western Pamirs of Tajikistan. It is stretched in a north-south direction and considered to be the core of the Pamir mountain system.

== Geography ==
The highest peak of the range is the Ismoil Somoni Peak. It was also the highest peak in the former Soviet Union. The length of the Academy of Sciences Range is about 110 km. The crest of the range has an Alpine-like relief with 24 summits more than 6,000 m in height. The lowest saddle point, Kamaloyak (Камалояк), is at the altitude of 4,340 m (14,240 ft).

The range is formed of sedimentary and metamorphic rocks of the Paleozoic Era, and partially granites. It is covered by permanent snow, which feeds a large number of big glaciers. The total area of the glacial ice is around 1,500km^{2} (580 sq mi).

== History ==
The Academy of Sciences Range was first mapped by Russian geographer and Pamir explorer Nikolai Korzhenevskiy and named after the Soviet Academy of Sciences in 1927.

== See also ==
- list of mountains of Tajikistan
- Ismoil Somoni Peak
- Peak Korzhenevskaya
- Mount Garmo
