= List of Tajik people =

This is a list of notable people from the Tajik ethnic group, a Persian-speaking Iranic people native to modern day Tajikistan, Afghanistan and Uzbekistan. This list may also includes other closely associated ethnicities to Tajiks.

== Politicians ==
- Burhanuddin Rabbani, former President of Afghanistan, founder of the Jamiat-e Islami.
- Habibullah Kalakani, former King of Afghanistan
- Rustam Emomali, Mayor of Dushanbe and the eldest son of president Emomali Rahmon
- Abdurahmon Karimov, political party chairman in Tajikistan
- Jamshed Karimov, former Prime Minister of Tajikistan and a cousin of former President of Uzbekistan Islam Karimov
- Ahmed Shah Massoud, Commander and Mujahideen in Afghanistan, assassinated by Al Qaeda
- Rahmon Nabiyev, First Secretary of the Communist Party of Tajikistan and two time President of Tajikistan
- Emomali Rahmon, current President of Tajikistan
- Kokhir Rasulzoda, current Prime Minister of Tajikistan
- Fawzia Koofi, politician, writer
- Anahita Ratebzad, a socialist and Marxist-Leninist politician
- Meena Keshwar Kamal, Feminist and human rights activist
- Faiz Ahmad, politician
- Abdul Latif Pedram, politician and a Member of Parliament in Afghanistan
- Atta Muhammad Nur, politician
- Karim Massimov, Kazakh politician
- Ahmad Massoud, politician and the founder of the National Resistance Front of Afghanistan
- Ahmad Zia Massoud, politician
- Shirinsho Shotemur, a founding father of Tajikistan
- Amrullah Saleh, former Vice President of Afghanistan
- Sayid Abdulloh Nuri, founder and leader of Islamic Renaissance Party of Tajikistan
- Fatima Payman, Australian politician

== Military ==
- Sherali Mirzo, Minister of Defense since November 2013
- Emomali Sobirzoda, Chief of the General Staff of the Armed Forces of the Republic of Tajikistan
- Negmatullo Kurbanov, Commanding Officer of the Tajik Internal Troops
- Abduhalim Nazarzoda, former Deputy Minister of Defense
- Latif Fayziyev, Commander of the Tajik Mobile Forces
- Saimumin Yatimov, Chairman of the State Committee for National Security
- Ramazon Rahimov, Minister of Internal Affairs
- Gulmurod Khalimov, lieutenant-colonel when commander of the police special forces of the Interior Ministry of Tajikistan until 2015, he then defected to the Islamic State of Iraq and the Levant
- Ismail Khan, Former Minister of Water and Energy and Governor of Herat
- Ahmad Shah Massoud, Afghan military personnel. Fought in the Afghan-soviet war and then the Afghan civil wars. He was famously named the lion of Panjshir
- Mohammad Qasim Fahim, former Marshal of Afghanistan, former Minister of Defense of Afghanistan and former Vice President
- Mir Masjidi Khan, Resistance leader against the British Empire in the First Anglo-Afghan War
- Mir Bacha Khan Kohdamani, Resistance leader against the British Empire in the Second Anglo-Afghan War
- Sayyid Husayn, former Minister of Defense and Saqqawist leader
- Purdil Khan, former Marshal and Minister of Defense of Afghanistan, Saqqawist leader
- Faizal Maksum, Tajik Basmachi Leader
- Bismillah Khan, Former Minister of Defense

== Sports ==
- Farshad Noor, Professional football player
- Omid Musawi, Professional football player
- Omran Haydary, Professional football player
- Sharif Nazarov, football coach
- Alisher Chingizov, Professional swimmer
- Sherali Dostiev, Professional boxer currently competing in AIBA’s Light flyweight division
- Shamil Aliev, Former professional wrestler who competed in the men's light heavyweight category
- Farzad Mansouri, Taekwondo fighter
- Somon Makhmadbekov, Professional judoka wrestler who came 3rd place in 2024 Summer Olympics of Paris in the Men’s 81 kg event
- Nematullo Asranqulov, Professional Judoka wrestler who won a silver medal for his division (middleweight) at the 2007 Asian Judo Championships
- Temur Rakhimov, Professional Judoka wrestler who won bronze medal at 2024 Summer Olympics in Paris’s Men's +100 kg event
- Rasul Boqiev, Professional Judoka wrestler who won bronze medal at the 2007 World Judo Championships. Tajikistan's first ever Olympic medal, at the 2008 Summer Olympics
- Komronshokh Ustopiriyon, Professional Judoka wrestler who competed in 2016 Summer Olympics of Rio de Janeiro and won 2 gold medals (2016, 2017) in Asian Judo Championships’s middleweight class
- Mukhamadmurod Abdurakhmonov, Judoka wrestler who competed in 2016 Summer Olympics’s Men's +100 kg event
- Sherali Bozorov, Professional Judoka wrestler who won a silver medal for his division (Half-Middleweight) at the 2007 Asian Judo Championships
- Saidahtam Rahimov, Professional Judoka wrestler who competed in the men's heavyweight event at the 1996 Summer Olympics
- Khayrullo Nazriev, Professional Judoka wrestler who competed in the men's half-heavyweight event at the 1996 Summer Olympics
- Akmal Murodov, Professional Judoka wrestler who represented Tajikistan in the men's 81 kg event at the 2020 Summer Olympics
- Behruzi Khojazoda, Professional sambist and Judoka wrestler
- Khushqadam Khusravov, Professional sambist and Judoka wrestler
- Rustam Boqiev, Professional judoka wrestler
- Rauf Hukmatov, Professional judoka wrestler
- Parviz Sobirov, Professional judoka wrestler
- Makhmud Muradov, Professional MMA fighter who competed in the UFC’s Middleweight division
- Abdul Azim Badakhshi, Former professional MMA fighter and Kickboxer
- Siyar Bahadurzada, Former professional MMA fighter who competed in the UFC’s Welterweight division
- Muhammad Naimov, Professional MMA fighter who currently competes in the UFC’s Featherweight division

== Business ==
=== Afghanistan ===
- Roya Mahboob, businesswoman
- Mahmoud Saikal, a Tajik diplomat and international development specialist
- Manizha Wafeq, businesswoman

=== Uzbekistan ===
- Rus Yusupov, Jewish-American co-founder of Vine and the co-founder and CEO of HQ Trivia

== Musicians and singers ==
=== Tajikistan ===
==== Classical/Folk ====
- Davlatmand Kholov
- Fatima Kuinova
- Jurabek Murodov
- Shoista Mullojonova
- Tolib Shahidi
- Tuhfa Fozilova
- Suleiman Yudakov
- Yakhiel Sabzanov
- Zafar Nozim
- Ziyodullo Shahidi

==== Pop ====
- Karomatullo Qurbonov
- Nargis Bandishoeva
- Nigina Amonkulova
- Noziya Karomatullo
- Madina Aknazarova
- Manija Dawlat
- Tahmina Niyazova
- Kibriyo Rajabova
- Shabnam Surayyo
- Zulaykho

==== Rock/Metal ====
- Nobovar Chanorov
- Oleg Fesov
- Muboraksho Mirzoshoyev
- Daler Nazarov
- Parem

=== Afghanistan ===
==== Classical/Ghazal ====
- Abdul Rahim Sarban
- Ahmad Wali
- Hangama
- Haidar Salim
- Jalil Zaland
- Nasrat Parsa
- Soheila Zaland
- Rahim Bakhsh
- Zheela

==== Pop ====
- Amir Jan Sabori
- Asad Badie
- Aryana Sayeed
- Farid Rastagar
- Ghazal Sadat
- Mojgan Azimi
- Mozhdah Jamalzadah
- Seeta Qasemi
- Parasto
- Rahim Jahani
- Rahim Mehryar
- Qader Eshpari
- Wajiha Rastagar

==== Folk ====
- Miri Maftun

=== Uzbekistan ===
Pop

- Daler Xonzoda
- Nasiba Abdullaeva

== Literature Figures ==
=== Authors and poets ===
- Khalilullah Khalili
- Sadriddin Ayni
- Mirzo Tursunzoda
- Loiq Sherali
- Farzona
- Timur Zulfikarov
- Makhfi Badakhshi
- Asad Gulzoda
- Mirsaid Mirshakar
- Gulrukhsor Safieva
- Roziya Ozod
- Gulnazar Keldi
- Gulchehra Sulaymoni
- Zulfiya Atoulloeva
- Abdumalik Bahori
- Latofat Kenjaeva
- Iskandar Khatloni
- Mavjuda Hakimova
- Ozod Aminova
- Khursheda Otakhonova
- Hadisa Qurbonova
- Qahar Asi

== Arts and culture ==
- Murivat Bekhnazarov
- Zuhur Habibullaev
- Rohat Nabieva
- Hammasa Kohistani
- Suleiman Sharifi

== Science ==
=== Afghanistan ===
- Mohammed Dawran
- Ghulam Faroq Nijrabi
- Nazif Shahrani

=== Uzbekistan ===
- Salizhan Sharipov
- Khalimakhon Suleymanova

== See also ==
- Lists of people by nationality
- List of Tajik Dynasties
