= Culture of Tajikistan =

The culture of Tajikistan has developed over thousands of years. Tajik culture can be divided into two areas, Metropolitan and Kuhiston (Highland). Modern city centres include Dushanbe (the capital), Khudjand, Kulob, and Panjikent.

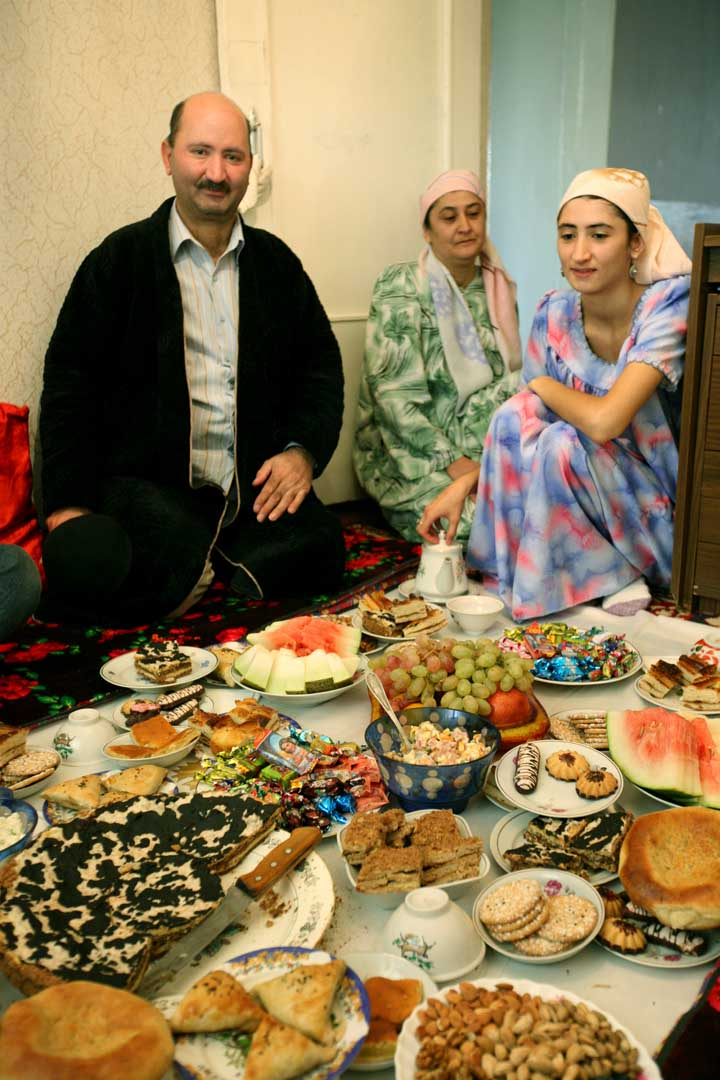
A native Tajik family celebrating Eid in Tajikistan.

== Religion ==
Zoroastrianism had been adopted by Persian emperors as a state religion, and was practiced in Central Asia as well. It eventually declined after the Arab conquests. The largest celebration in Tajikistan to come from the pre-Islamic period is Navruz, which means "New Day". It is held on March 21 or 22, when the cultivation of the land starts. During Navruz, many families visit relatives, throw out old belongings, clean the house, and play field games. Special dishes are also served. Other pre-Islamic Tajik traditions like fire jumping, dancing around the fire, and fighting 'devils' with fire, still occur in the more remote regions.

== Cuisine ==
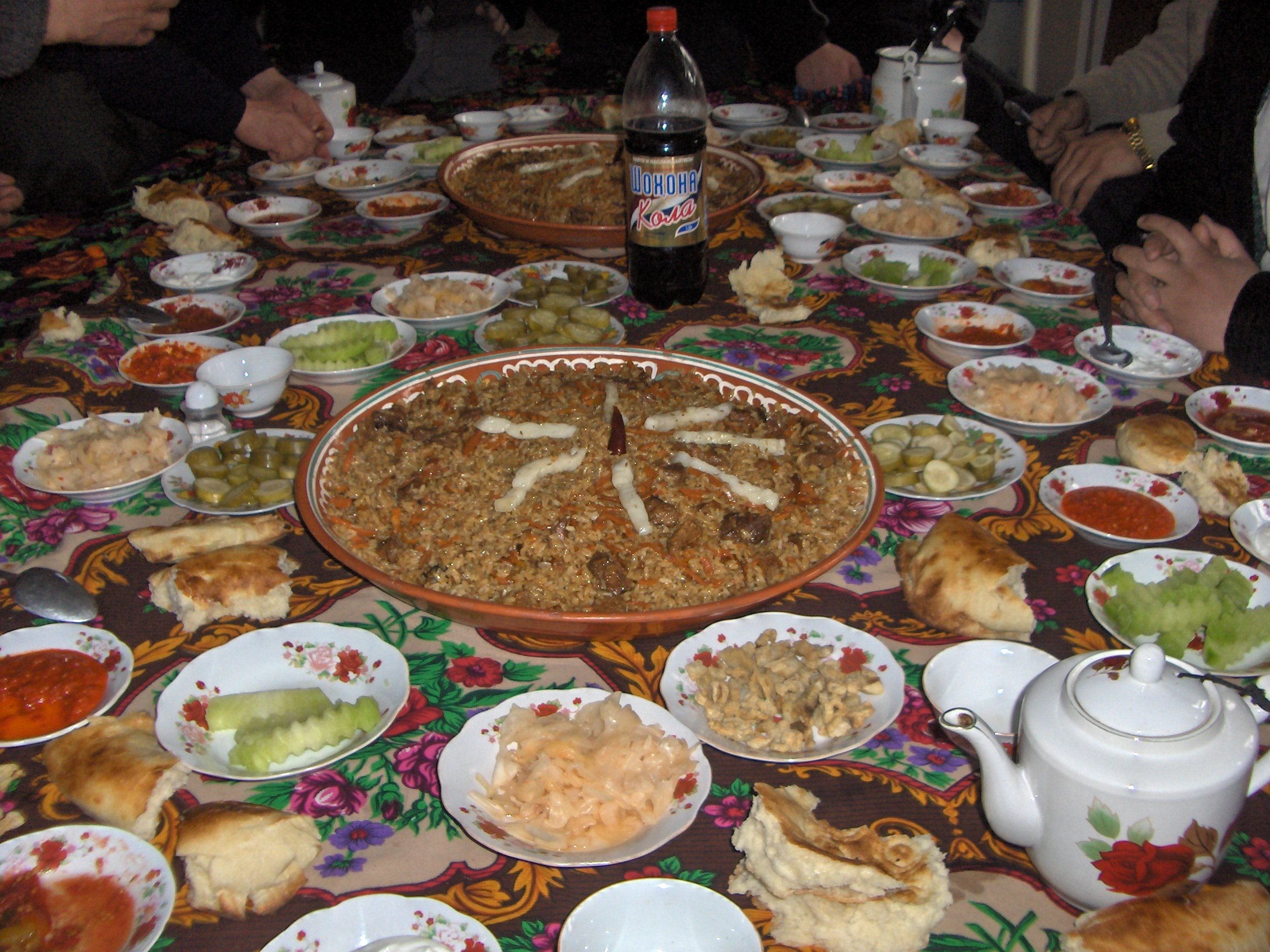
A Tajik feast.

Tajik cuisine has much in common with Uzbek, Afghan, Russian, and Iranian cuisines. It is known for dishes such as kabuli pulao, qabili palau, and samanu. The national food and drink are plov and green tea, respectively.

Traditional Tajikistani meals begin with small dishes of dried fruit, nuts, and halva, followed by soup and meat, and finished with plov. Tea accompanies every meal, and is often served between meals as a gesture of hospitality. It is often drunk unsweetened. Tajik cuisine offers a large variety of fruit, meat, and soup dishes.

== Sport ==
Tajikistan's mountains provide many opportunities for outdoor sports, such as hill climbing, mountain biking, rock climbing, skiing, snowboarding, hiking, and mountain climbing. The facilities are limited, however. Mountain climbing and hiking tours to the Fann and Pamir Mountains, including the 7,000 m peaks in the region, are seasonally organized by local and international alpine agencies.

Football is the most popular sport in Tajikistan. The Tajikistan national football team competes in FIFA and AFC competitions. The top clubs in Tajikistan compete in the Tajik League.

Four Tajikistani athletes have won Olympic medals for their country since independence. They are: wrestler Yusup Abdusalomov (silver in Belijing 2008), judoka Rasul Boqiev (bronze in Beijing 2008), boxer Mavzuna Chorieva (bronze in London 2012) and Dilshod Nazarov (gold in hammer throw in Rio 2016) .

== Cinema ==
Tajikistan's film industry dates from 1929. The first official movie studio, called Tajikkino (later renamed to Tajikfilm), began operation in 1930. In 1935, Tajikkino started producing movies with voice-over. Some experts believe 1970–80 to be the golden age for Tajikfilm. Subsidized by the government, the studio was able to produce about six feature films each year.

Examples of Tajikfilm's success during the Soviet times are such movies as The Legend of Rustam, The Legend of Rustam and Siavoush, and The Legend of the Smith Kova, based on stories from Ferdowsi's Shahnameh; First Morning of Adolescence (Юнности Первое Утро), which tells the life story of people living in Badakhshan in the beginning of the Soviet Empire, when its army was still struggling with the Basmachi movement; a trilogy New tales from Shaherizada, based on Arabic tales One Thousand and One Nights.

Among prominent Tajik producers are Valeriy Ahadov and Davlat Khudoynazarov.

After the breakdown of the Soviet Union and the civil war in Tajikistan (1992–1997), Tajik cinema went downwards. The studio mainly survived by taking small foreign orders, and produced only a few of its own movies. Mohsen Makhmalbaf's film Sex & Philosophy from 2005 was set and produced in Tajikistan, as was the film Angel on the Right by Jamshed Usmonov from 2002. Other Tajik movies produced in the past two decades include: Kosh ba Kosh (1993), Business trip (1998, documentary), and Luna Papa (1999, a joint project of Tajikfilm with some counterparts from Germany, Austria, Switzerland, Japan, and Russia).

== Art ==
Chakan embroidery is the practice of sewing symbolic images on cotton or silk with brightly colored thread. These depict mythological images, nature, or the cosmos. The embroidery is done on clothing and on common household items such as curtains, bedspreads, and pillows. Chakan items are an important part of marriage ceremonies, with a bride wearing a Chakan shirt and the groom wearing an embroidered skullcap called a "tāqi". Tajik women and girls will commonly wear Chakan clothing during national festivals and holidays.

Women create this art form, either individually or in communal settings. When working individually the craftswomen will get help from their daughters and other family members. In a communal setting the craftswomen gather in one home, taking direction from the most experienced one and being assigned an individual task for the process. These tasks can include image design, fabric cutting, embroidering, sewing garments, and taking orders for the sale of the products. The products created by these craftswomen are sold in bazaars or dress shops, providing an important source of income.

The practice of Chakan embroidery is passed down from one generation of women to the next, to ensure the practice continues to thrive. A craftswoman will pass down her knowledge to her daughter, granddaughter, and daughter-in-law. Chakan embroidery can also be learned in group settings from an expert craftswoman, referred to as the "ustod-shogird" or "master-student" method.

In 2018, Chakan embroidery was inscribed on UNESCO's Representative List of the Intangible Cultural Heritage of Humanity.

== Music ==
Traditional Tajik music is closely related to other Central Asian music forms. Shashmaqam is the predominant style of Tajik folk music, though falak is popular in southern Tajikistan. The Pamiris of the Gorno-Badakhshan Autonomous Province have their own distinct style of music as well.

== Literature ==
Traditional centers of Tajik literature were Samarkand and Bukhara, however these cities are now in Uzbekistan. In recent history, Tajik literature has been predominantly social realist. Though Tajiks do not draw a line, between their own literature and general Persian literature, there have been a few notable Tajik writers and poets. The standardization of the Tajik language has shaped Tajik literature in recent decades as well.

== Cultural revival ==
One thousand years after the Samanid period, another cultural revival occurred; this time due to the Soviet's modern drama, opera, and ballet. Poets such as Mirzo Tursunzoda, Mirsaid Mirshakar, and Loik Sherali; novelist and historian Sadridin Aini, all figured prominently in this revival, as did professors M Ishoki and Osimi, scholar Sotim Ulughzoda, novelist Jalol Ikromi, and anthropologist and historian Bobojon Ghafurov. In 1969, Malika Sobirova won a gold medal in an international ballet competition.

Since independence, there has been a pre-Soviet cultural revival in an attempt to foster a sense of national identity. Novelist Taimur Zulfikarov, and professors Rahim Masov and Bozor Sobir being prominent.

== Gallery ==
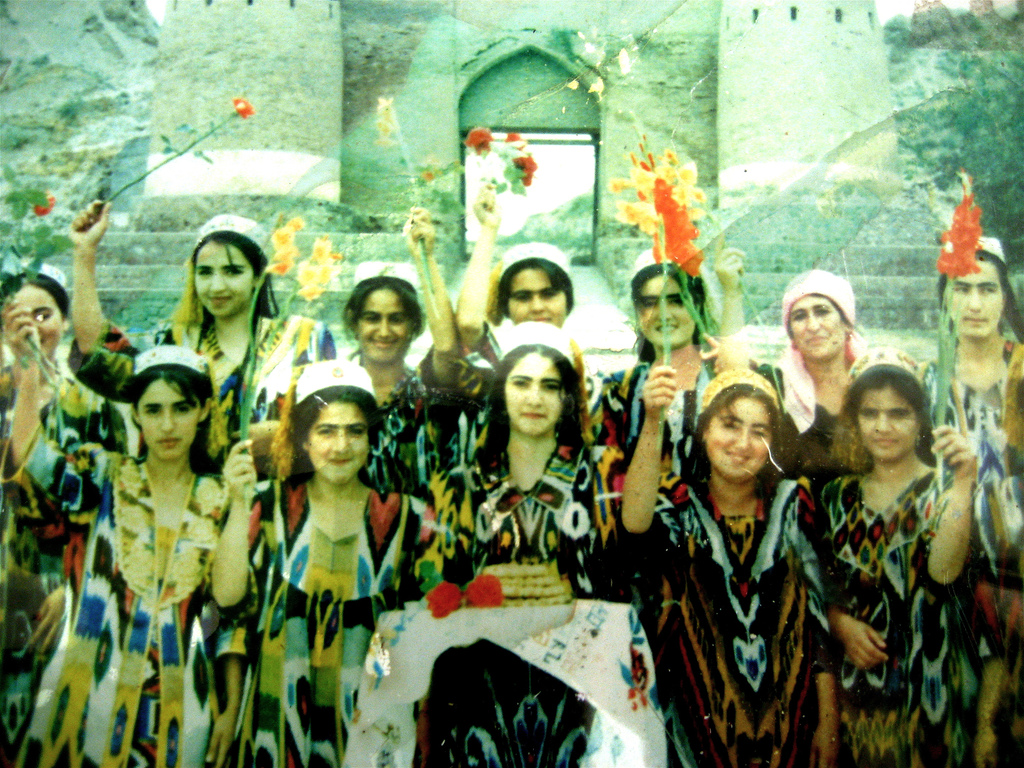
A Tajik women in traditional dress.

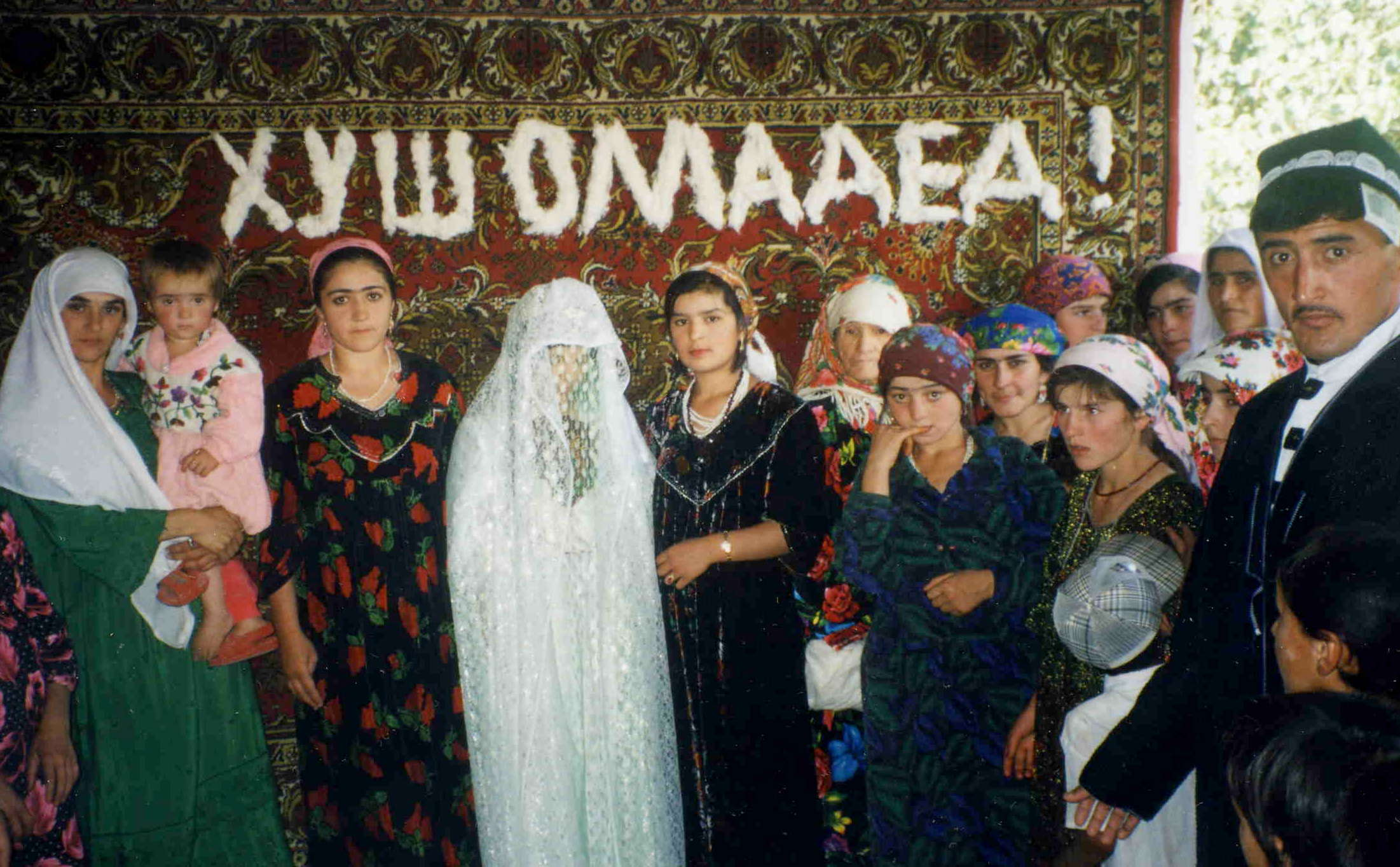
A traditional Tajik wedding.

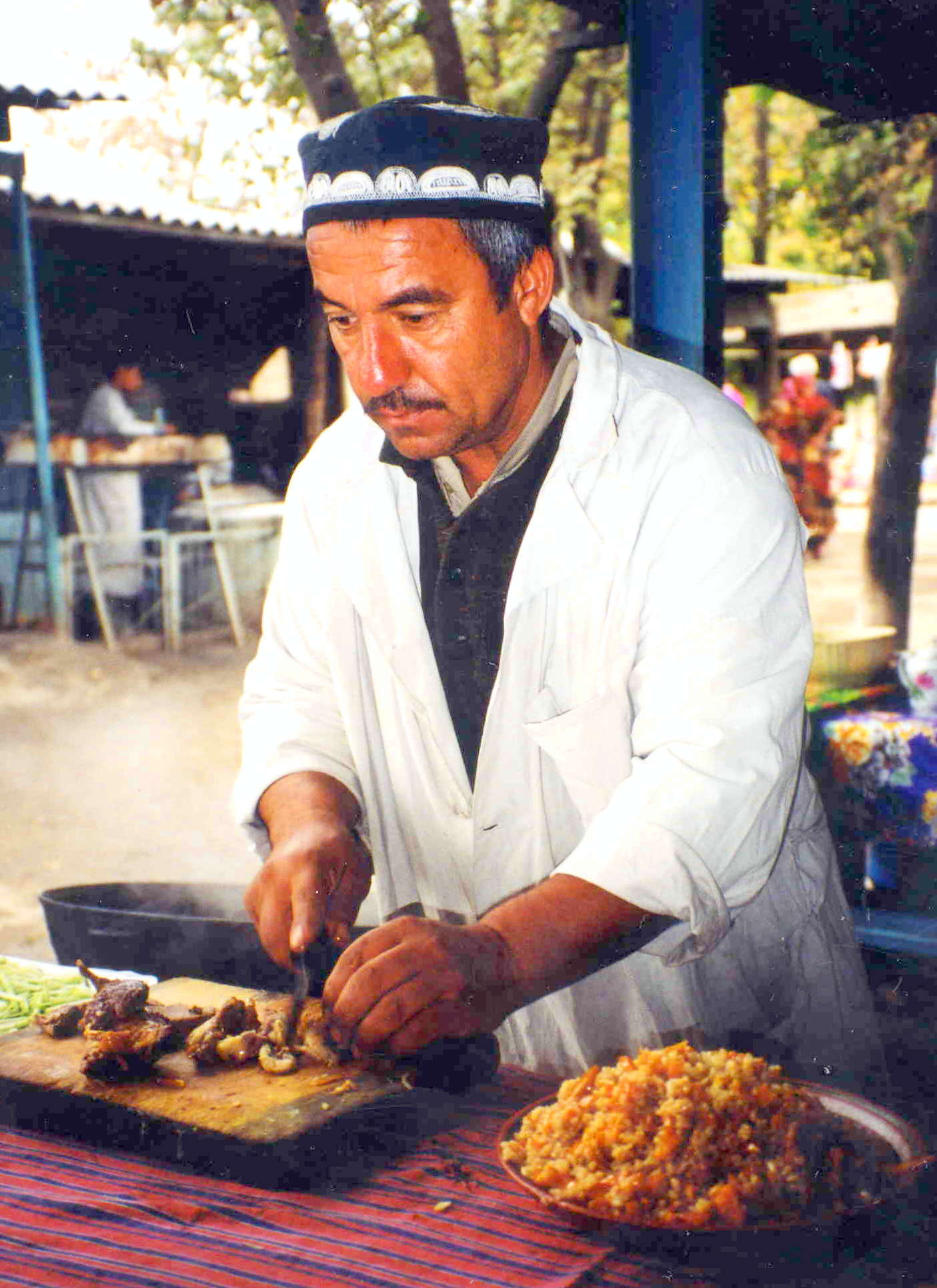
A man makes plov, the national dish of Tajikistan.

A monument in Dushanbe to Tajik writers.

== See also ==
- Architecture of Central Asia
- Public holidays in Tajikistan
- Literature of Tajikistan
- Afghan culture
- Uzbek culture
