= Kurbanov =

Kurbanov, Kurbanow, Kurbonov or Qurbonov (Russian: Курбанов) is a masculine surname common in the southern parts of the former Soviet Union; its feminine counterpart is Kurbanova, Kurbanowa, Kurbonova or Qurbonova. It may refer to:

- Abdusalom Kurbonov (1959-2021), Tajikistani politician
- Akhmed Kurbanov (born 1986), Russian football player
- Bakhodir Kurbanov (wrestler) (born 1972), Uzbekistani wrestler
- Bakhodir Kurbanov (general)
- Çarymyrat Kurbanow (born 1977), Turkmenian, football referee
- Hadisa Qurbonova (born 1940), Tajikistani poet and playwright
- Igor Kurbanov (born 1993), Russian football defender
- Jahon Qurbonov (born 1986), Tajikistani boxer
- Karomatullo Qurbonov (1961–1992), Tajikistani pop singer and composer
- Kurban Kurbanov (born 1985), Uzbekistani freestyle wrestler
- Magomed Kurbanov (footballer) (born 1992), Ukrainian-Russian-Azerbaijani football player
- Magomed Kurbanov (born 1995), Russian boxer from Dagestan
- Mukhtor Kurbonov (born 1975), Uzbek football player and coach
- Murad Kurbanov (born 1992), Russian football player
- Nariman Kurbanov (born 1997), Kazakhstani gymnast
- Nikita Kurbanov (born 1986), Russian basketball player
- Negmatullo Kurbanov (born 1963), Tajikistani general
- Nurkhon Kurbanova (born 1994), Uzbekistani Paralympic athlete
- Rashid Kurbanov (born 1987), Uzbekistani-Russian freestyle wrestler
- Rizvan Kurbanov (born 1961), Russian politician
- Ruslan Kurbanov (disambiguation) – several people
- Shamil Kurbanov (born 1993), Russian football defender
- Shohrat Kurbanov (born 1971), Turkmen boxer
- Utkir Kurbanov (born 1983), Uzbekistani judoka
- Aydogdy Kurbanov (born 1978), Turkmenistani archeologist and historian
