= Chagatai Tajiks =

Ethnic group of Uzbekistan and Tajikistan

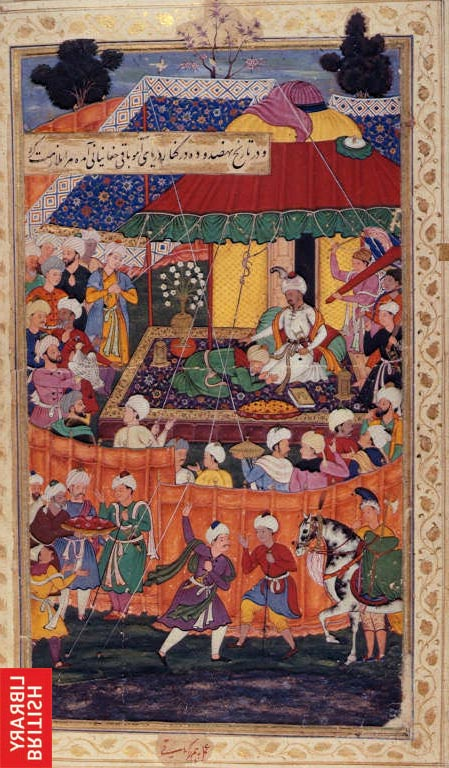
Baqi Beg Chaghtai, younger brother of Khusrau Shah Kokultash, pays homage to Babur.

The Chagatai Tajiks were a sub-ethnic group of Tajiks living in the Surxondaryo Region of southeastern Uzbekistan and in southern Tajikistan. They were estimated to number 63,500 in 1924–25. Together with the Kharduri, the Chagatai are one of the ethnographic groups of Tajiks who maintain a distinct identity. The origin of the people is unknown, although the name Chagatai is of Mongol origin, as Chagatai Khan was a son of Genghis Khan.

== History ==
The Chagatai Tajiks started being referred to as Uzbeks from the 1926 Soviet Census. Soviet historian Mikhail Khudyakov suggested that the Chagatai may have been neither fully Uzbek nor fully Tajik but rather Tajiks at some stage of Turkicisation or Uzbeks who had adopted the Tajik language.

The Turkic Chagatai language is not the language of the Chagatai Tajiks.

== See also ==
- Kharduri people
- Tajiks
