= Lolaniso Ismailova =

Tajik biologist (1929–2012)

Lolaniso Ismoilova
- Born: 4 October 1929
- Died: 11 December 2012 (aged 83); Dushanbe, Tajikistan
- Education: Tajik National University
- Scientific career
- Fields: Biology
- Workplaces: Tajik National University

Lolaniso Ibrohimovna Ismoilova (Tajik: Лоланисо Иброҳимовна Исмоилова; 4 October 1929 – 11 December 2012) was a Tajikistani biologist, active during the Soviet era.

== Life and career ==
Born into a working-class family in Dushanbe, Ismoilova graduated from the Department of Biology of the Tajikistan State University in 1953. In 1965 she joined the Communist Party of the Soviet Union. She became an assistant professor in the Department of Histology at the University in 1970, and in 1974 was promoted to become head of the Department of Biology and General Genetics of the Tajikistan State Medical Institute. She received a doctoral degree in biology in 1986. As a researcher, Ismoilova concerned herself with the structure and function of lymph nodes once they had been subjected to fire. She also studied post-traumatic postnatal issues, and did work on the restoration and transplantation of blood vessels in kidneys. Among her publications are Environmental Upkeep and People's Health (1984) and A Short Russian-Tajiki-Dari Dictionary of Biology (Dushanbe, 1973). She published over 180 articles and papers during her career, including 24 instructional methods and two textbooks.

Ismoilova died in Dushanbe on 11 December 2012, at the age of 83.
