= Guljahon Bobosodiqova =

Tajik-Soviet politician and women's rights activist

- Гулҷаҳон Бобосодиқова
- Born: 1937 (age 88–89); Uroteppa, Tajik SSR, Soviet Union
- Other names: Guljahon Bobosadikova, Guljahon Bobosadykova
- Occupations: politician, women's rights activist
- Years active: 1961–present

Guljahon Bobosodiqova (Tajik: Гулҷаҳон Бобосодиқова (born 1937) is a Tajik politician and prominent women's rights activist. She has served as a deputy in the Supreme Soviet of the Tajik SSR and the Supreme Soviet of the USSR. Bobosodiqova was honored three times with the Order of the Red Banner of Labor and was a recipient of the Order of the Presidium of the Supreme Soviet of Tajikistan.

== Early life ==
Guljahon Boboevna Bobosodiqova was born in 1937 in Uroteppa, Tajik Soviet Socialist Republic to Fazilat and Boboev Bobosodiqov. Her parents both worked in civil service, but her father died when she was young. Her mother, who was the first woman in charge of the Department of Women's Affairs encouraged Bobosodiqova in her dreams to study science. Bobosodiqova studied mathematics and physics at Tajikistan State University and graduated with a degree in 1959. She wanted to continue her studies, but further education required support of the Communist Party. She joined the party, but instead of continuing her education was selected for political roles.

== Career ==
In 1961, Bobosodiqova became the secretary of the Komsomol in Dushanbe. She would become one of the key features of Tajikistani politics in the decades between 1960 and 1980. She served at various times as a Deputy in the Supreme Soviet of the Tajik SSR and the Supreme Soviet of the USSR and between 1972 and 1975 was the Deputy Chair of the Party in Tajikistan. She served three terms as the Deputy representing the Badakhshan Province and two terms for the Kulob District in the Khatlon Region. For her work, Bobosodiqova was awarded the Order of the Presidium of the Supreme Soviet of Tajikistan and received the Order of the Red Banner of Labor three times. She lived in Moscow until the break up of the Soviet Union in 1991 and then returned to Tajikistan.

The focus of much of Bobosodiqova's later career was on women's rights and she worked to create educational opportunities for women. One of the founders of the Association of Public High School Education, she led the organization for 25 years. She has worked with women's organizations, governmental institutions, and political parties to press for legislation on women's issues, such as domestic violence, laws to change the age of consent and consanguinity regulations for marriage eligibility, and address issues such as lack of leadership positions, adequate medical services, and human trafficking.
