= Salimjon Aioubov =

Tajik journalist and writer

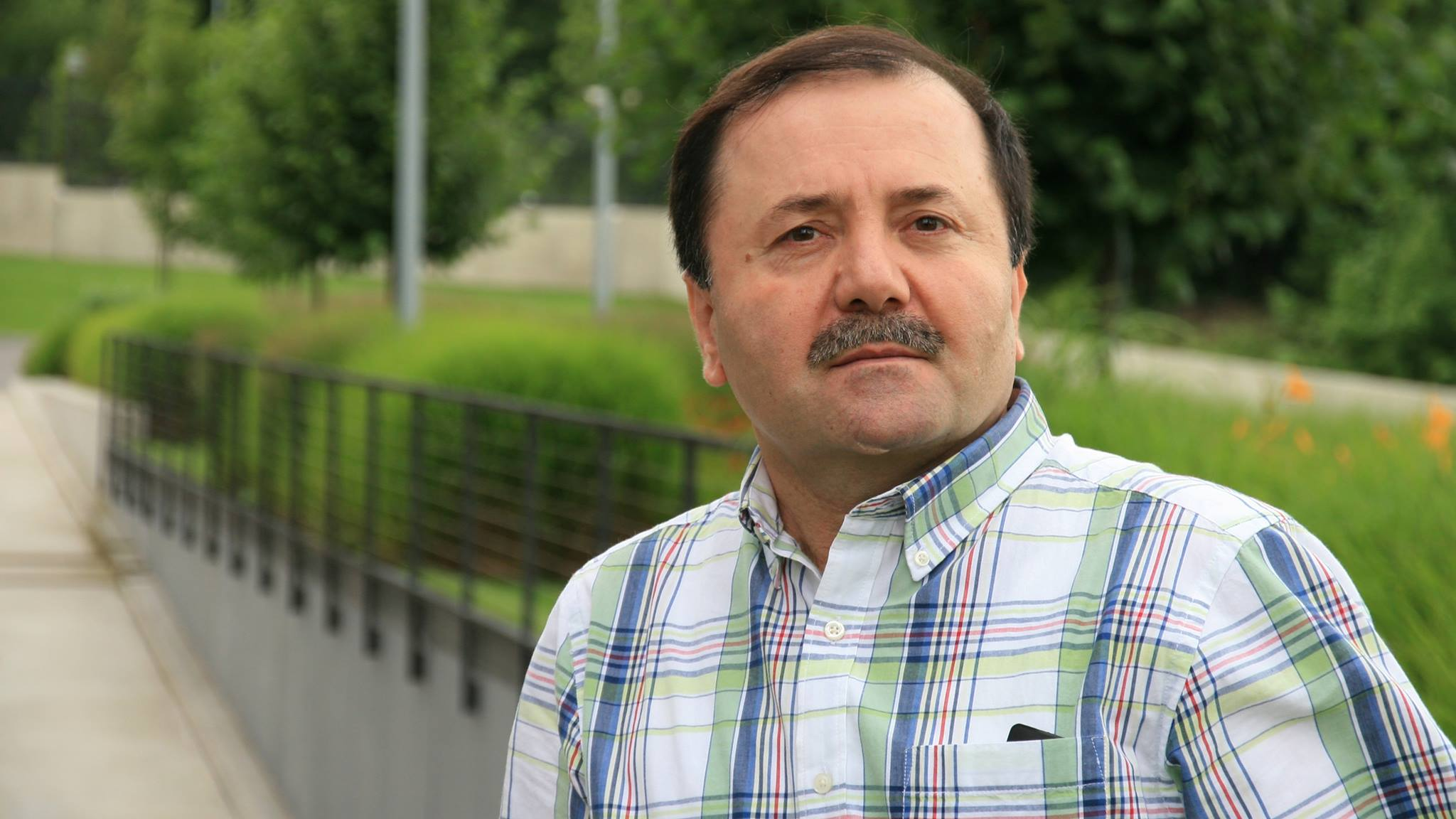
Salimjon Aioubov

Salimjon Aioubov (Tajik: Салимҷон Аюбов, Persian: سلیم‌جان ایوب‌اف, Mascho, USSR, 18 April 1960) is a Tajik journalist, reporter and writer. In primary school, he began writing articles, anecdotes and stories which were published in children's newspapers in Soviet Tajikistan.

After graduating Tajikistan State University, Aioubov worked at different publishing houses in Dushanbe and Moscow. He was an editor of political and social department of a social weekly newspaper ("Адабиёт ва санъат") Literature and Art, deputy editor Haftganj "Ҳафтганҷ" and editor-in-chief of Charogi Ruz "Чароғи рӯз". He wrote six books and was awarded the Journalists Union of CIS in 1991 and Otakhon Latifi Award in 2017.

Aioubov is a senior broadcaster with RFE/RL’s Tajik Service. After graduating from Tajik State University in 1982, he worked for numerous Tajik media outlets in print, radio, and television. From 1992 to 1997, he covered the civil war in Tajikistan, refugee issues, inter-Tajik peace talks under UN mediation, OIC conferences, and Shanghai Cooperation Organisation Summits. He directed two short documentaries on Tajik issues, Mi, Pereselentsi (1986) and Perpetual Returning (1989), and published several books, most recently, Hundred colors. Tajiks in the 20th Century (Amsterdam, 2004).
