= Khursheda Otakhonova =

Tajikistan poet (1932–2016)

Khursheda Otakhonova (2 September 1932 – 23 June 2016) was a Tajikistani poet and literary critic. Her poems were published under the mononym Khursheda.

Otakhonova was born in Istaravshan (then called Uroteppa), and graduated from Tajikistan State University in 1953, taking her degree in Persian language and literature; she was the first person from Tajikistan to earn a degree in philology. From 1953 until 1972 she worked at the Rudaki Language and Literature Institute; during this time, in 1959, she joined the Communist Party of the Soviet Union. In 1972 she became the institute's director. Otakhonova's first articles appeared in the 1950s. Among the writers she researched were Sadriddin Ayni, Abolqasem Lahouti, Mirzo Tursunzoda, and Muhammadjon Rahimi; among her publications were Rahim Jalil va Osori U (Rahim Jalil and His Works, 1962), Padidahoi Navjui (Innovative Phenomena, 1972), Paivandi Hiss va Andisha (The Relation Between Feeling and Thought, 1982), and Tahavvoloti Doston dar Nazmi Mu'osir (The Development of Story in Modern Verse, 1983). From 1983 she was a member of the Union of Writers of Tajikistan. She was awarded multiple medals and other decorations throughout her career, including the Jubilee Medal "In Commemoration of the 100th Anniversary of the Birth of Vladimir Ilyich Lenin", and in 1994 she was named an Honored Worker of Tajikistan. At her death, she was interred in the Sari Osiyo cemetery in Dushanbe.
