= Mavjuda Hakimova =

Tajikistan poet (1932–1993)

Mavjuda Hakimova (5 May 1932 – 1993) was a Soviet-Tajikistani poet and playwright. She is sometimes known by the mononym Mavjuda.

== Life ==
Born into a family of workers in Khujand, then called Leninabad, Hakimova graduated from the Tajikistan State University in Dushanbe in 1958 and began working as an editor for numerous journals, including Pioneri Tojikiston (Pioneer of Tajikistan), Komsomoli Tojikiston (Komsomol of Tajikistan), Maš'al (Torch), and Zanoni Tojikiston (Women of Tajikistan). She joined the Communist Party of the Soviet Union in 1962. Her first poems appeared in 1951; with the publication of her first collection, Surudi sahar (Sunrise Song) in 1964, she gained much acclaim, and won a place in the Union of Soviet Writers in 1965. Much of her work combines the conventions of Persian poetry with standard Soviet ideas, and deals with the themes of love and nature. In the 1970s Hakimova turned to writing plays, depicting daily life in Tajikistan in the post-Stalin era. She also wrote two volumes of poetry for children. Hakimova was much awarded during her career; among the decorations which she received from the Soviet government were the Order of the Badge of Honour, the Order of Friendship of Peoples, and the Jubilee Medal "In Commemoration of the 100th Anniversary of the Birth of Vladimir Ilyich Lenin". Hakimova died in Khujand in 1993.

== Works ==
=== In Tajik ===
- Surudi sahar, 1964
- Mavjuda Hakimova, Dushanbe, 1970 (in the "Ilhom" series)
- Mošinai mošinsavor, 1972
- ''Zistan meḵohad, 1973
- Afsonai solinavī, Dushanbe, 1973
- Habiba, Dushanbe, 1973
- Soyai gunoh, 1974
- Intizorī, 1975
- Yak qatra oftob, Tashkent, 1975
- ''Ba sūi nur, 1976
- Nabzi roh, Dushanbe, 1977
- Bačahoi guldast, 1978
- Zafar, Dushanbe, 1979
- Tūi bahor, Dushanbe, 1980
- ''Daryoi mehr, 1982
- Šaršara, Dushanbe, 1982
- Maro naḡz mebined? Še'rhoi bačagona, Dushanbe, 2008

=== In Russian ===
- Dalëkiĭ put' k svetu. Stikhi i poèma, tr. R. F. Kazakova, Moscow, 1974.
- Kto krasivyĭ. Stikhi, tr. M. Khakimova, Moscow, 1982.
- Reka lyubvi. Stikhi, tr. V. Savel'ev, Moscow, 1987.
- Blagodarenie. Stikhi i poèmy, tr. R. F. Kazakova and V. Savel'ev, Dushanbe, 1988

=== Studies ===
- S. Davronov, "Mavjuda," in Èntsiklopediyai adabiët va san'ati tojik II, ed. A. Q. Qurbonov et al., Dushanbe, 1989, p. 123.
- Mirzā Mollā-Aḥmadov, Ḵubān-e Pārsigu: bānovān-e soḵansarā-ye tājik, Tehran, 2003.
- Pisateli Tadzhikistana, Dushanbe, 1986, pp. 444–46.
- Usmon Tojī, Šoirahoi boiste'dod, Dushanbe, 1962.
