= Turdikhon Berdieva =

Tajikistani linguist and Orientalist

- Born: 7 July 1942; Konibodom, Tajik SSR, USSR
- Died: 1 April 2008 (aged 65); Khujand, Tajikistan

Academic background
- Education: Tajikistan State University

Academic work
- Discipline: Linguist
- Sub-discipline: Tajik linguistics
- Institutions: Tajikistan State University

Turdikhon Ishonovna Berdieva (7 July 1942 – 1 April 2008) was a Tajikistani linguist and Orientalist.

Born into a working-class family in Konibodom, Berdieva graduated from Tajikistan State University in 1963. In 1967 she began teaching there in the Department of Arabic in the Faculty of Oriental Languages. She joined the Communist Party of the Soviet Union in 1971. In 1983 she received a doctorate in philology; three years later she became a professor. During her career much of her research was concerned with Arabic vocabulary and grammatical elements that made their way into the Tajik language. Interested in sociolinguistics, she was also a linguistic purist, concerned with ways in which foreign words could be prevented from entering Tajik. Among her writings was Arabic Words and Grammatical Compositions in Tajik, published in Dushanbe in 1968; other works deal with such subjects as the language of Tajik poetry, the work of Farzona, and the development of the Tajik language in the Soviet era. In 1984 Berdieva was named a Distinguished Contributor to Tajik Education. She was included in a list of the 100 Greatest Tajiks published in 2013.

Berdieva died in Khujand on 1 April 2008.
