= Latofat Kenjaeva =

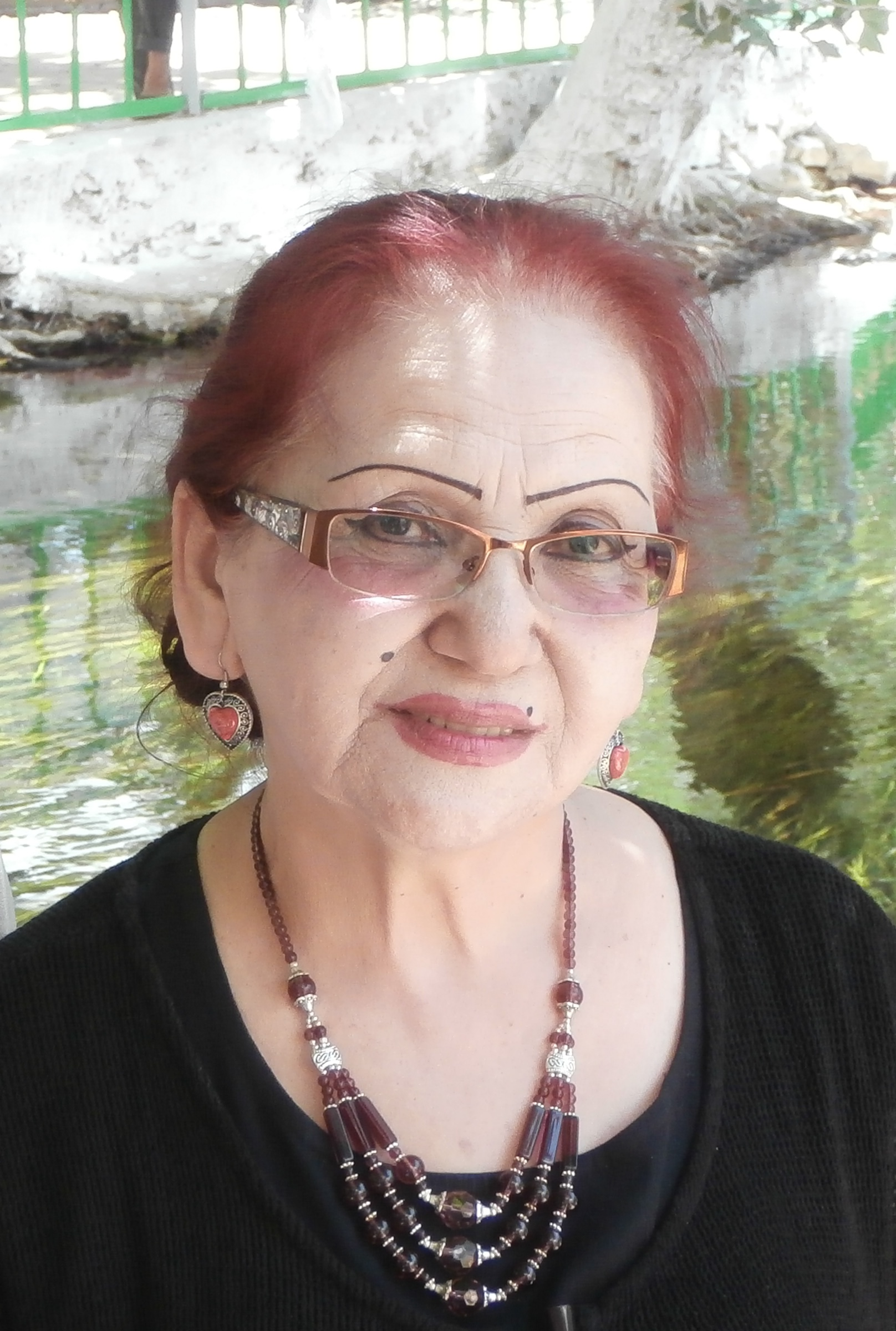

Latofat Kenjaeva (penname Sabrin) is a Tajik poet, writer, and journalist.

== Biography ==
She was born in the Ghonchi district of the Sughd Province of Tajikistan on 8 June 1950. After graduating from the district's School No.1 in 1967, she began studying journalism at Tajik National University, graduating with distinction in 1972. Her first job was in the drama division of the Committee for Radio and Television in Tajikistan. Since 1981 she has been the editor-in-chief of the youth and children's magazine Istiqbol (formerly Mash'al), which officially became an international organization in 2008. She is a member of the Union of Writers of Tajikistan (1996) and the Union of Journalists of Tajikistan (1998). Her many works include poetry for both children and adults and prose writing. Many examples of her first works appeared in the book Examples of Children's Poetry (Tazkirai adabieti bachagon, 1997). Her book of riddles and language games, The Little Chest of Pearls (Sanduqchai marvorid), was first published in 1997, and was made an official textbook for public schools by the Ministry of Education of the Republic of Tajikistan in 1998, and is now in its third printing. Her works have been published in translation into Russian, English, Uzbek, Belarusian, Ukrainian and several other languages.

== Published works ==
Other notable published works of Latofat Kenjaeva include:

- Lolaarusak (1980)
- Taronaho (1982)
- Marjoni ranga (1986)
- Sharorai khotiraho (1990)
- Sanduqchai marvorid (1997)
- Rozi shabnam (2000)
- Musicha va Durdona (2003)
- Ohi Gusasta (2003)
- Noma ba barodar (2005)
- Gurbai Somon va jujai Orash (2005)
- Najotbakhshi dune kist? (2005)
- Qofiiabozi 1-2 (2006)
- She'ro (2009)
- Khilvati gesu (2009)
- Farishtae ba nuri orzu (2009)
- Afsonai Tilonur (2010)
- Gahvorajunbon (2010)
- Sarguzashti jujai dono (2013)
- Afsonai 10 (2013)
- Bozii rustshavakon (2013)
- Shukron kujoi? (2014)
- Ochabuzi Shohona (2014)
- Sadbargi hae (2014)
