= List of Tajik dynasties and states =

The following is a list of states, principalities, empires and dynasties which were founded by rulers or dynasties of Tajik origin.

== Medieval ==
- Ghurid dynasty (786–1215), a Persianate dynasty of Tajik origin, originating from the region of Ghur in modern Afghanistan which ruled large parts of the Indian subcontinent and Khorasan.
- Kart dynasty (1244–1381), a Tajik dynasty closely related to the Ghurids, ruling a large parts of Khorasan with their capitals at Herat and Bamyan.

== Modern ==
- Darvaz Khanate (?–1878), an independent principality that ruled parts of Badakhshan. The rulers of the khanate claimed descent from Alexander the Great but were ethnic Tajiks from Darvaz.
- Kashgar Emirate (1865–1877), ruled by Yakub Beg, who was a native Persian speaker and ethnic Tajik. The emirate came about as a result of a rebellion against the Qing Empire and was later reconquered by them.
- Emirate of Afghanistan (1929), an unrecognized kingdom ruled by Habibullah Kalakani and the Saqqawist movement holding power for only nine months. The movement consisted mostly of ethnic Tajiks, including Kalakani.
- Tajik Soviet Socialist Republic (1929–1991), one of the constituent republics of the Soviet Union created for the Tajiks, it preceded the Tajik Autonomous Soviet Socialist Republic of the Uzbek SSR. The Republic was governed by mostly Ethnic Tajiks who were part of the Tajik Communist Party. It gained independence after the Soviet Union collapsed and was succeeded by the Republic of Tajikistan.
- Republic of Tajikistan (1991–present), a Tajik secular state ruled by Emomali Rahmon since 1994. It is the direct successor to the Tajik Soviet Socialist Republic.

== See also ==
- List of Tajik people
- List of Sogdian states
- Samanid Empire
- Emirate of Badakhshan
