= Tajiks =

Iranian ethnic group

Tajiks Тоҷикон تاجیکان
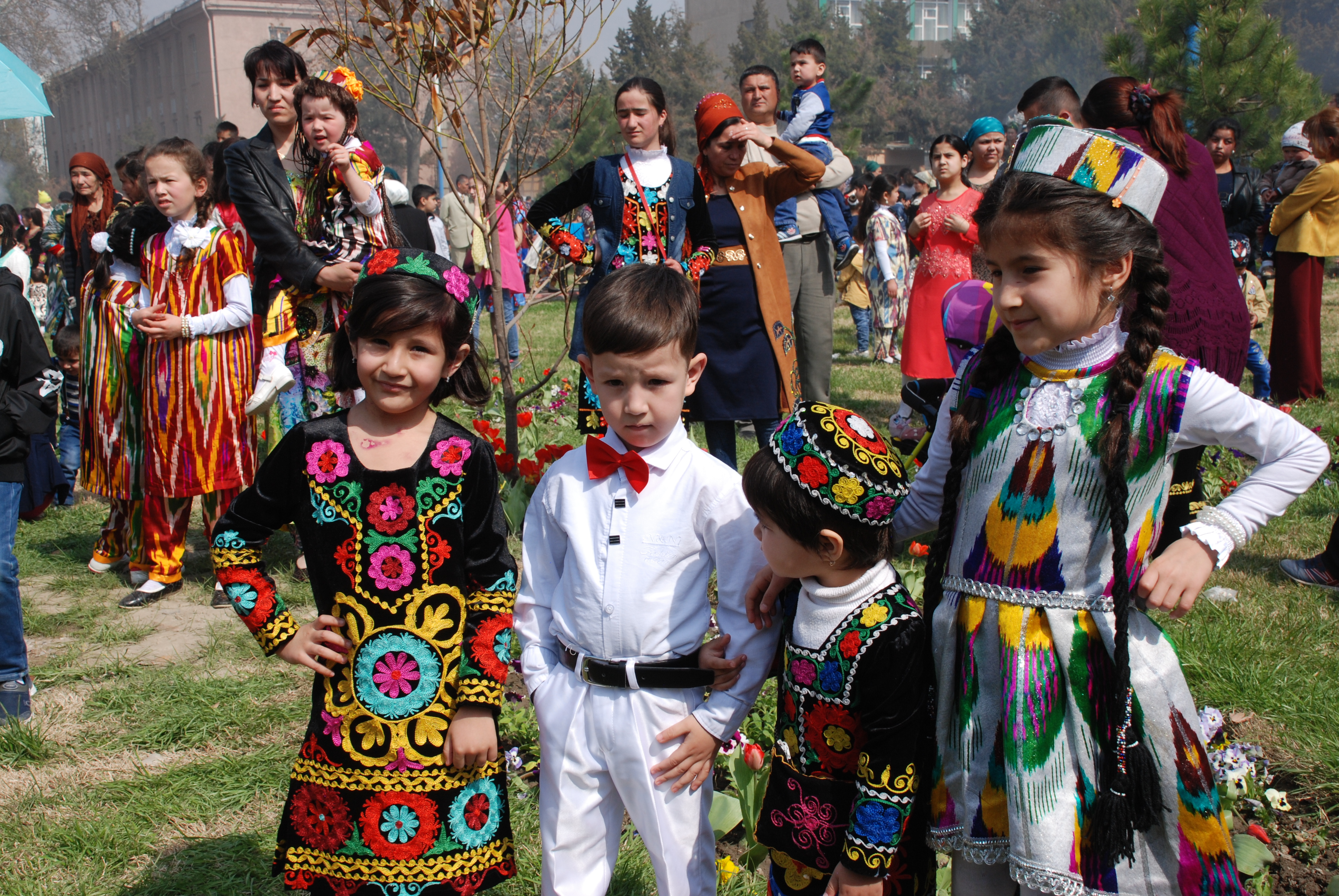
- A Tajik Nowruz festival in Tajikistan, 2018

Total population
- c. 20–33 million

Regions with significant populations
- Afghanistan: c. 9–12 million (2025)
- Tajikistan: c. 9 million (2025)
- Pakistan: 1,880,000 (2023)
- Uzbekistan: 1,657,336 (official estimate, 2021); 8–11 million (other estimates)
- Russia: 350,236 (2021)
- Kyrgyzstan: 59,900 (2022)
- Kazakhstan: 58,712 (2025)
- China: 50,896 (2020)

Languages
- Persian (Dari and Tajik); Secondary: Russian, Uzbek

Religion
- Predominantly Sunni Islam, minority Shia Islam

Related ethnic groups
- Other Iranian peoples, Persians

Tajiks (Note: Persian: تاجیکان, (Note: Dari pronunciation: [t̪ʰɑː.dʒɪ.kɑ́ːn]) Tajik: Тоҷикон), (Note: Tajik pronunciation: [t̪ʰɔ.d͡ʒi.kɔn]) also spelled Tadzhiks or Tadjiks,; /tɑːˈdʒiːk/ tah-JEEK; also UK: /ˈtɑːdʒɪk/ TAH-jik; also US: /tɑːˈdʒɪk/ tah-JIK, /tə-/ tə-) are a group of various Persianate Eastern Iranian peoples native to Central Asia, living predominantly in Afghanistan and Tajikistan with substantial minorities in Pakistan and Uzbekistan. Tajiks are the largest ethnicity in Tajikistan and the second-largest in both Afghanistan and Uzbekistan. They speak varieties of Persian, a West Iranian language. In Tajikistan, since the 1939 Soviet census, the small Pamiri and Yaghnobi ethnic groups have been included as Tajiks. In China, the term is used to refer to the Pamiri ethnic groups of Xinjiang, who speak the Eastern Iranian Pamiri languages. In Afghanistan, the Pamiris are considered a separate ethnic group.

As a self-designation, the literary New Persian term Tajik, which originally had some pejorative usage as a label for eastern Persians or Iranians, has become acceptable during the last several decades, particularly as a result of Soviet administration in Central Asia. Alternative names for the Tajiks are Fārsīwān (Persian-speaker) and Dīhgān (cf. Tajik: Деҳқон), which translates to 'farmer or settled villager'; in a wider sense, it means 'settled' in contrast to 'nomadic', and was later used to describe a class of land-owning magnates as 'Persian of noble blood' in contrast to Arabs, Turks, and Romans during the Sasanian and early Islamic periods. Historically, the term Tajik was used synonymously and interchangeably with Persian.

The Tajiks are of mixed origin and are primarily descendants of Bactrians, Sogdians, and Scythians, but also of Persians, Greeks, and various Turkic peoples of Central Asia, all of whom are known to have inhabited the region at various times. Tajiks are therefore mainly Eastern Iranian in their ethnic makeup but speak a Persian dialect, which is a Western Iranian language; they likely adopted the language in the seventh century AD following the Islamic conquest of Persia. This was when the Persian language consequently spread further east, leading to the gradual extinction of the Bactrian and Sogdian languages. The Tajiks and their ancestors have inhabited northern Afghanistan, Tajikistan, and other parts of Central Asia continuously for many millennia. The culture of the Tajiks is predominantly Persianate but contains strong elements from other cultures of Central Asia, such as Turkic cultures, and is heavily infused with Islamic traditions.

== History ==
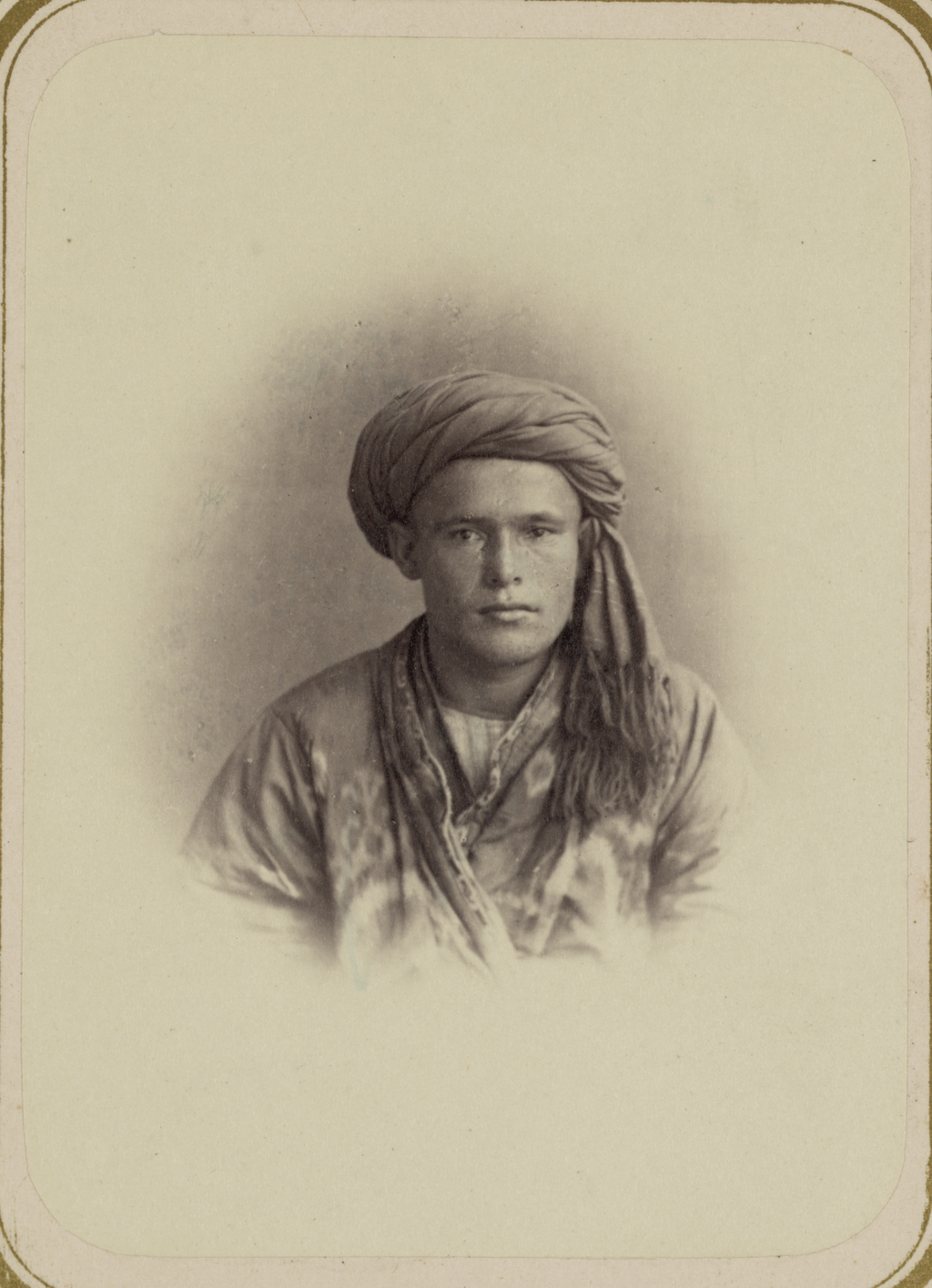
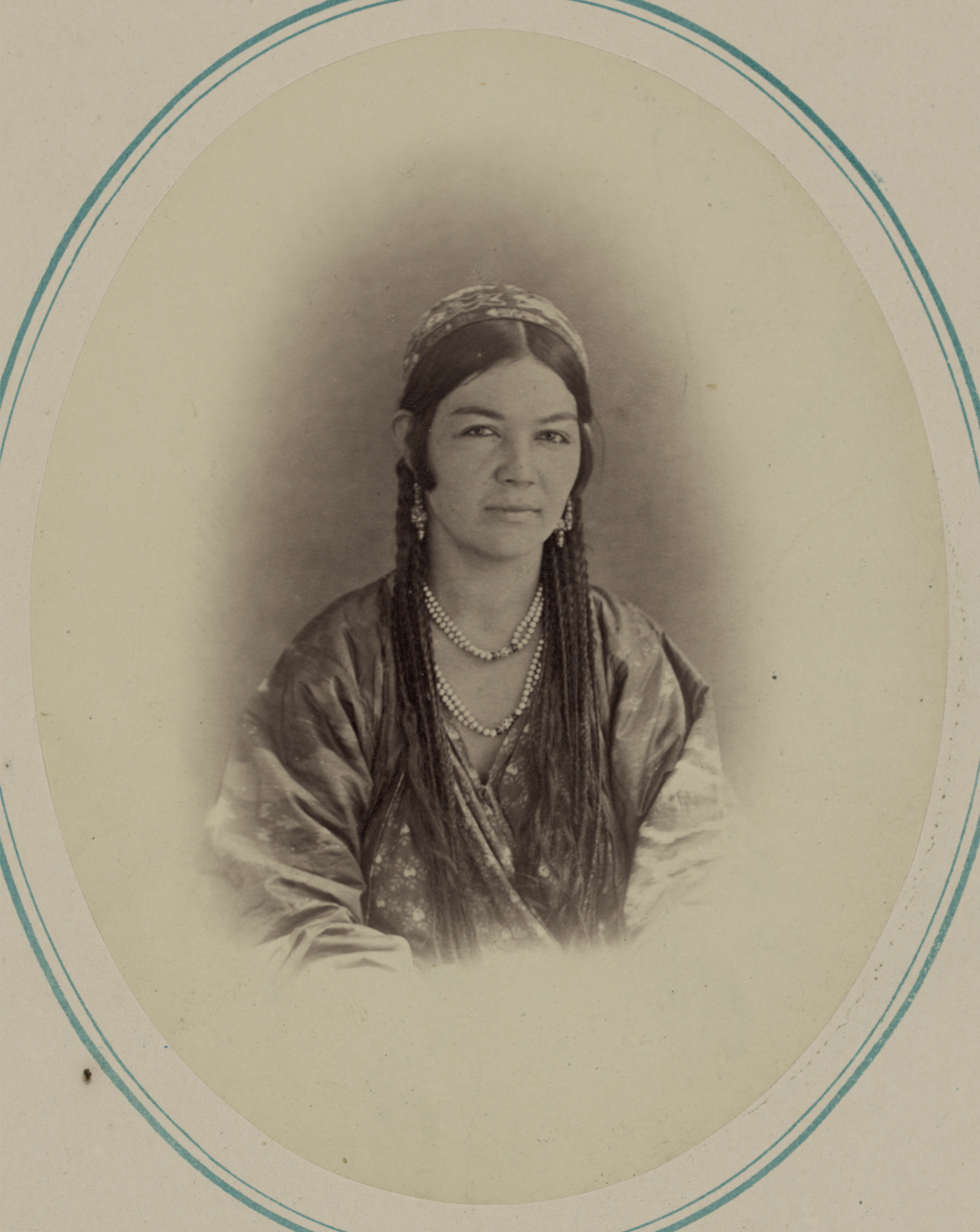
Tajik man and woman in 19th century photos

The Tajiks are an Iranian people who speak a variety of Persian and are concentrated in the Oxus basin, the Fergana Valley (in Tajikistan and parts of Uzbekistan), and on both banks of the upper Oxus, namely the Pamir Mountains in Tajikistan and north-eastern Afghanistan (Badakhshan). Historically, the ancient Tajiks were chiefly agriculturalists before the Arab conquest of Iran. Although agriculture remained a stronghold, the Islamization of Iran also resulted in the rapid urbanisation of historical Khorasan and Transoxiana, which lasted until the devastating Mongolian invasion. Several surviving ancient urban centres of the Tajik people include Samarkand, Bukhara, Khujand, and Termez.

Contemporary Tajiks are the descendants of ancient Eastern Iranian inhabitants of Central Asia, in particular the Sogdians and the Bactrians. They are also possible descendants of other groups, with an admixture of Western Iranian Persians and non-Iranian peoples. The latter group includes Greeks, who are known to have settled in the region of present-day Tajikistan and Uzbekistan before and after the conquests of Alexander the Great, some of whom were referred to as Dayuan by ancient Chinese chronicles. According to Richard Nelson Frye, a leading historian of Iranian and Central Asian history, the Persian migration to Central Asia may be considered the beginning of the modern Tajik nation, with ethnic Persians, together with some elements of East-Iranian Bactrians and Sogdians, as the main ancestors of modern Tajiks. In later works, Frye expands on the complexity of the historical origins of the Tajiks. In a 1996 publication, Frye explains that many 'factors must be taken into account in explaining the evolution of the peoples whose remnants are the Tajiks in Central Asia' and that 'the peoples of Central Asia, whether Iranian or Turkic speaking, have one culture, one religion, one set of social values and traditions with only language separating them.'

Regarding Tajiks, the Encyclopædia Britannica states:

The Tajiks are the direct descendants of the Iranian peoples whose continuous presence in Central Asia and northern Afghanistan is attested from the middle of the 1st millennium BC. The ancestors of the Tajiks constituted the core of the ancient population of Khwārezm (Khorezm) and Bactria, which formed part of Transoxania (Sogdiana). Over the course of time, the eastern Iranian dialect that was used by the ancient Tajiks eventually gave way to Farsi, a western dialect spoken in Iran and Afghanistan.

The geographical division between the eastern and western Iranians is often considered historically and currently to be the desert Dasht-e Kavir, situated in the center of the Iranian plateau.

=== Modern history ===
During the Soviet–Afghan War, the Tajik-dominated Jamiat-e Islami, founded by Burhanuddin Rabbani, resisted the Soviet Army and the communist Afghan government. The Tajik commander Ahmad Shah Massoud successfully repelled nine Soviet campaigns aimed at capturing the Panjshir Valley, earning him the nickname 'Lion of Panjshir' (شیر پنجشیر).

== Etymology ==
According to John Perry (Encyclopaedia Iranica):

The most plausible and generally accepted origin of the word is Middle Persian tāzīk 'Arab' (cf. New Persian tāzi), or an Iranian (Sogdian or Parthian) cognate word. The Muslim armies that invaded Transoxiana early in the eighth century, conquering the Sogdian principalities and clashing with the Qarluq Turks (see Bregel, Atlas, Maps 8–10) consisted not only of Arabs, but also of Persian converts from Fārs and the central Zagros region (Bartol'd [Barthold], "Tadžiki," pp. 455–57). Hence the Turks of Central Asia adopted a variant of the Iranian word, täžik, to designate their Muslim adversaries in general. For example, the rulers of the south Indian Chalukya dynasty and Rashtrakuta dynasty also referred to the Arabs as "Tajika" in the 8th and 9th century. By the eleventh century (Yusof Ḵāṣṣ-ḥājeb, Qutadḡu bilig, lines 280, 282, 3265), the Qarakhanid Turks applied this term more specifically to the Persian Muslims in the Oxus basin and Khorasan, who were variously the Turks' rivals, models, overlords (under the Samanid Dynasty), and subjects (from Ghaznavid times on). Persian writers of the Ghaznavid, Seljuq and Atābak periods (ca. 1000–1260) adopted the term and extended its use to cover Persians in the rest of Greater Iran, now under Turkish rule, as early as the poet ʿOnṣori, ca. 1025 (Dabirsiāqi, pp. 3377, 3408). Iranians soon accepted it as an ethnonym, as is shown by a Persian court official's referring to mā tāzikān "we Tajiks" (Bayhaqi, ed. Fayyāz, p. 594). The distinction between Turk and Tajik became stereotyped to express the symbiosis and rivalry of the (ideally) nomadic military executive and the urban civil bureaucracy (Niẓām al-Molk: tāzik, pp. 146, 178–79; Fragner, "Tādjīk. 2" in EI2 10, p. 63).

The word also occurs in the 8th-century Tonyukuk inscriptions as tözik, used for a local Arab tribe in the Tashkent area. These Arabs were said to be from the Taz tribe, which is still found in Yemen. In the 7th-century, the Taz began to Islamize the region of Transoxiana in Central Asia.

According to the Encyclopaedia of Islam, however, the oldest known usage of the word Tajik as a reference to Persians in Persian literature can be found in the writings of the famous Persian poet and Islamic scholar Jalal ad-Din Rumi. The 15th-century Turkic-speaking poet Mīr Alī Šer Navā'ī, who lived in the Timurid Empire, also used Tajik as a reference to Persians.

== Location ==
The Tajiks are the principal ethnic group in most of Tajikistan, as well as in northern and western Afghanistan, although there are more Tajiks in Afghanistan than in Tajikistan. Tajiks also constitute a substantial minority in Uzbekistan, as well as in overseas communities. Historically, the ancestors of the Tajiks inhabited a larger territory in Central Asia than they do today. The term Tajik does not refer to a cohesive transnational ethnic group.

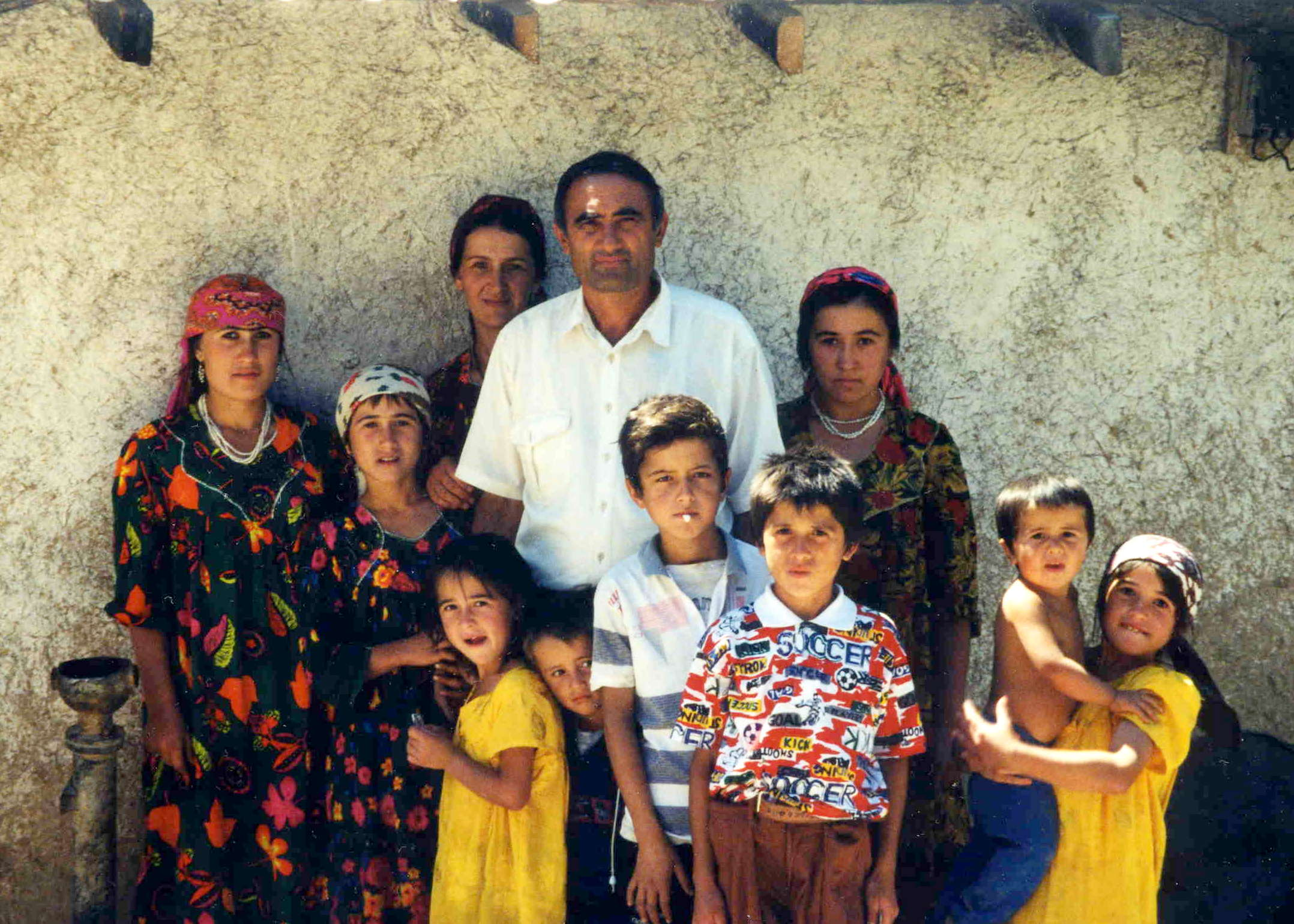
Tajik family in Tajikistan.

=== Tajikistan ===
Tajiks make up around 84.3% of the population of Tajikistan. This number includes speakers of the Pamiri languages, including Wakhi and Shughni, as well as the Yaghnobi people, who in the past were considered by the Soviet government to be separate nationalities from the Tajiks. In the 1926 and 1937 Soviet censuses, the Yaghnobis and Pamiri-language speakers were counted as distinct nationalities. After 1937, these groups were required to register as Tajiks.

=== Afghanistan ===
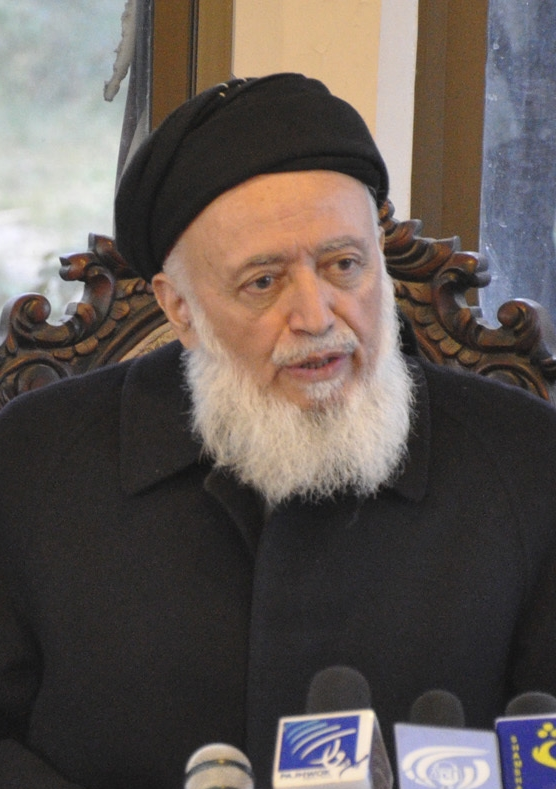
Burhanuddin Rabbani served as President of Afghanistan from 1992 to 1996, and again in 2001.

In Afghanistan, a 'Tajik' is typically defined as any primarily Dari-speaking Sunni Muslim who refers to themselves by the region, province, city, town, or village from which they originate, such as Badakhshi, Baghlani, Mazari, Panjsheri, Kabuli, Herati, Kohistani, and others.

Tajiks make up about 25–39% of Afghanistan's population. Nevertheless, no official data regarding ethnic populations exists in Afghanistan due to a lack of census. Historically, Tajiks were and still widely are not considered to be a distinct ethnic group.

=== Uzbekistan ===
In Uzbekistan, Tajiks constitute a minority in the ancient cities of Bukhara and Samarkand, and are found in large numbers in the Surxondaryo Region in the south and along Uzbekistan's eastern border with Tajikistan. According to official statistics (2000), Surxondaryo Region accounts for 20.4% of all Tajiks in Uzbekistan, with another 34.3% in the Samarqand and Bukhara regions.

Official statistics in Uzbekistan state that the Tajik community accounts for 5% of the nation's population. During the Soviet 'Uzbekization' supervised by Sharof Rashidov, the head of the Uzbek Communist Party, Tajiks had to choose either to remain in Uzbekistan and register as Uzbek in their passports, or to leave the republic for Tajikistan, which is mountainous and less agricultural. It was only in the last population census (1989) that nationality could be reported not according to the passport, but freely declared on the basis of the respondent's ethnic self-identification. This had the effect of increasing the Tajik population in Uzbekistan from 3.9% in 1979 to 4.7% in 1989.

According to other sources, Tajiks live primarily in the centres of cities such as Samarkand, Bukhara, and Termez, with practically no Tajik presence in the surrounding countryside. If one counts the population figures for these cities, it barely reaches one million. It is therefore unreasonable to claim that over six million Tajiks live in Uzbekistan, as Richard Foltz has claimed.

Even Arne Haugen, a Central Asia expert, criticised and noted in 2018: 'While Richard Foltz estimates over 6 million Tajiks in Uzbekistan, official census data reports only ~1.5 million (Stat.uz, 2023). This discrepancy likely stems from counting Tajik-speaking Uzbeks as ethnic Tajiks. Geographically, Tajiks are concentrated in urban Samarkand and Bukhara, with a negligible rural presence.'

According to the U.S. State Department Report, it is estimated that there are between 1.2 and 1.8 million Tajiks in Uzbekistan.

Official statistics in Uzbekistan state that the Tajik community accounts for 4.5% of the nation's population. Approximately 1.7 million Tajiks live in Uzbekistan. It is difficult to accurately count the number of Tajiks in Uzbekistan, as many Uzbeks, Turkmens, Azerbaijanis, and Jews also speak Persian.

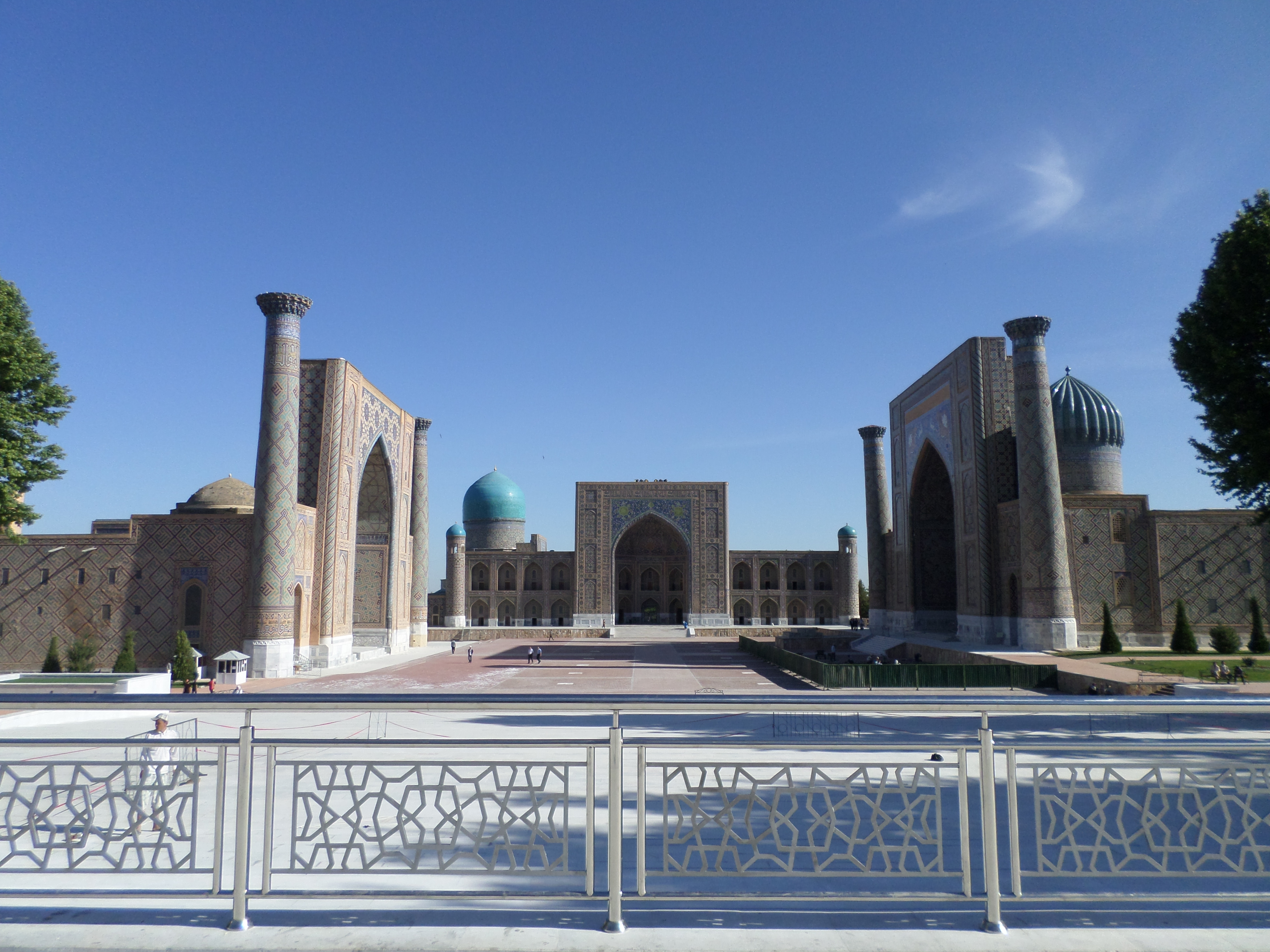
View of the Registan in Samarkand – although the second largest city of Uzbekistan, it is predominantly a Tajik-populated city, along with Bukhara.

=== China ===
Chinese Tajiks or Mountain Tajiks in China (Sarikoli: [tudʒik], Tujik; Chinese: 塔吉克族; pinyin: Tǎjíkè Zú), including Sarikolis (the majority) and Wakhis (a minority) in China, are the Pamiri ethnic group that lives in the Xinjiang Uyghur Autonomous Region in Northwestern China. They are one of the 56 nationalities officially recognised by the government of the People's Republic of China.

=== Kazakhstan ===
According to the 1999 population census, there were 26,000 Tajiks in Kazakhstan (0.17% of the total population), approximately the same number as in the 1989 census. By 2025, this figure had risen to 59,000.

=== Kyrgyzstan ===
According to official statistics, there were about 47,500 Tajiks in Kyrgyzstan in 2007 (0.9% of the total population), up from 42,600 in the 1999 census and 33,500 in the 1989 census.

=== Turkmenistan ===
According to the last Soviet census in 1989, there were 3,149 Tajiks in Turkmenistan, or less than 0.1% of the total population of 3.5 million at that time. The first population census of independent Turkmenistan, conducted in 1995, showed 3,103 Tajiks in a population of 4.4 million (0.07%), most of whom (1,922) were concentrated in the eastern provinces of Lebap and Mary, which adjoin the borders with Afghanistan and Uzbekistan.

=== Russia ===
The population of Tajiks in Russia was about 350,236 according to the 2021 census, up from 38,000 in the last Soviet census of 1989. Most Tajiks came to Russia after the dissolution of the Soviet Union, often as guest workers in places such as Moscow and Saint Petersburg, or in federal subjects near the Kazakhstan border. There are currently estimated to be over one million Tajik guest workers living in Russia, with their remittances accounting for as much as half of Tajikistan's economy.

=== Pakistan ===
There are an estimated 220,000 Tajiks in Pakistan as of 2012, mainly refugees from Afghanistan. During the 1990s, as a result of the Tajikistan Civil War, between 700 and 1,200 Tajiks arrived in Pakistan, mainly as students, or as the children of Tajik refugees in Afghanistan. In 2002, around 300 requested to return home and were repatriated to Tajikistan with the help of the IOM, UNHCR, and the authorities of both countries.

=== United States ===
There are 8,414 Tajiks living in the United States.

== Genetics ==
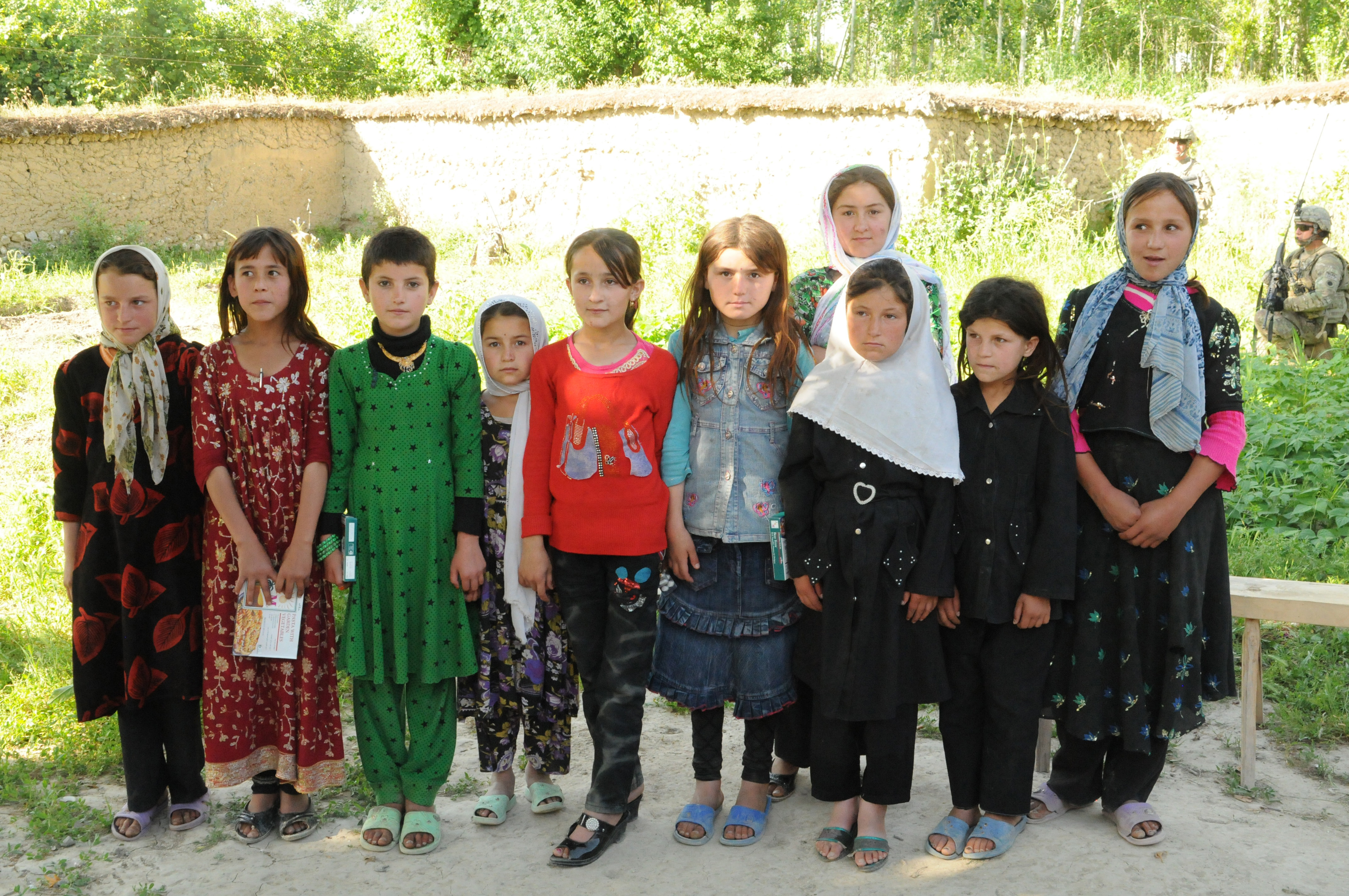
Tajik girls in Khwahan, Afghanistan

A 2014 study of the maternal haplogroups of Tajiks from Tajikistan revealed substantial admixture of West Eurasian and East Eurasian lineages, as well as the presence of minor South Asian and North African lineages. Another study reports that the Tajik mtDNA gene pool harbours nearly equal proportions of eastern Eurasian and western Eurasian haplotypes.

West Eurasian maternal lineages included haplogroups H, J, K, T, I, W, and U. East Eurasian lineages included haplogroups M, C, Z, D, G, A, Y, and B. South Asian lineages detected in this study included haplogroups M and R. One lineage in the Tajik sample was assigned to the North African maternal haplogroup X2j.

The dominant paternal haplogroup among modern Tajiks is Haplogroup R1a Y-DNA. Approximately 45% of Tajik men share R1a (M17), ~18% J (M172), ~8% R2 (M124), and ~8% C (M130 & M48). Tajiks of Panjikent score 68% R1a, while Tajiks of Khojant score 64% R1a. According to another genetic test, 63% of Tajik male samples from Tajikistan carry R1a. This high frequency, combined with low diversity of Tajik R1a, reflects a strong founder effect.

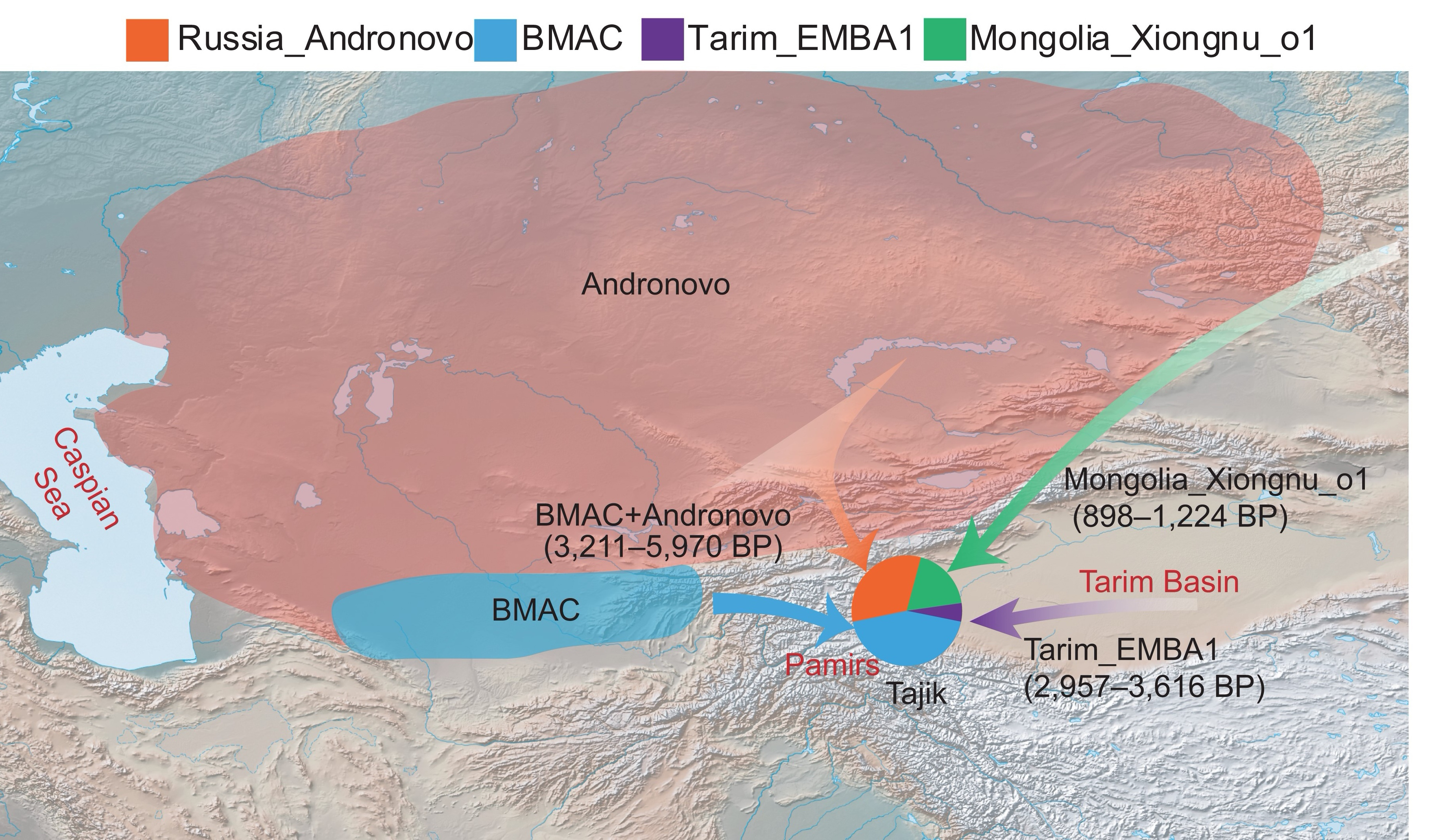
Schematic map showing the possible admixture model for Tajik populations. The time in parentheses represents a range. Arrows in different colours indicate ancestral sources and directions of the gene flow.

An autosomal DNA study by Guarino-Vignon et al. (2022) suggested that modern Tajiks show genetic continuity with ancient samples from Tajikistan and Turkmenistan. The genetic ancestry of Tajiks consists largely of a West-Eurasian component (~74%), an East Asian-related component (~18%), and a South Asian component (~8%). According to the authors, the South Asian affinity of Tajiks was previously unreported, although evidence for the presence of a deep South Asian ancestry had already been found previously in other Central Asian samples (e.g., among modern Turkmens and historical Bactria–Margiana Archaeological Complex samples). Both historical and more recent gene flow (~1500 years ago) shaped the genetic makeup of southern Central Asian populations, such as the Tajiks. A follow-up study by Dai et al. (2022) estimated that the Tajiks derive between 11.6% and 18.6% of their ancestry from admixture with an East-Eurasian steppe source represented by the Xiongnu, with the remainder of their ancestry being derived from Western Steppe Herders and BMAC components, as well as a small contribution from the early population associated with the Tarim mummies. The authors concluded that Tajiks 'present patterns of genetic continuity of Central Asians since the Bronze Age'.

== Culture ==
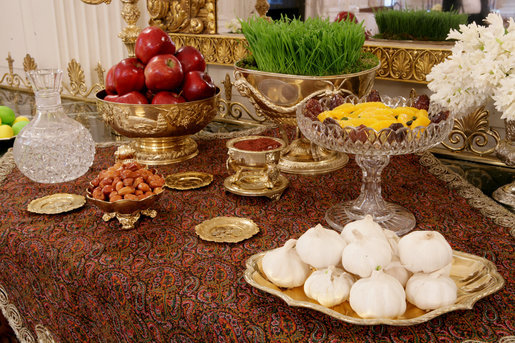
Haft-Seen, White House ceremony for new Persian Year, prepared by Laura Bush.

=== Language ===
Tajik autonomous republic coat of arms with Persian language: جمهوری اجتماعی شوروى مختار تاجيكستان

The language of the Tajiks is an eastern dialect of Persian, called Dari (derived from Darbārī, '[of/from the] royal courts', in the sense of 'courtly language'), or also Parsi-e Darbari. In Tajikistan, where the Cyrillic script is used, it is called the Tajiki language. In Afghanistan, unlike in Tajikistan, Tajiks continue to use the Perso-Arabic script, as is also the case in Iran. When the Soviet Union introduced the Latin script in 1928, and later the Cyrillic script, the Persian dialect of Tajikistan came to be disassociated from the Tajik language. Many Tajik authors have lamented this artificial separation of the Tajik language from its Iranian heritage. One Tajik poem relates:

Once you said 'you are Iranian', then you said, 'you are Tajik' May he die separated from his roots, he who separated us.

Since the 19th century, Tajiki has been strongly influenced by the Russian language and has incorporated many Russian loan words. It has also adopted fewer Arabic loanwords than Iranian Persian, while retaining vocabulary that has fallen out of use in the latter language.

Many Tajiks can read, speak, or write in Russian, although the prestige and importance of Russian has declined since the fall of the Soviet Union and the exodus of Russians from Central Asia. Nevertheless, Russian fluency is still considered a vital skill for business and education.

The dialects of modern Persian spoken throughout Greater Iran share a common origin. This is because one of Greater Iran's historical cultural capitals—Greater Khorasan, which included parts of modern Central Asia and much of Afghanistan and constitutes the ancestral homeland of the Tajiks—played a key role in the development and propagation of the Persian language and culture throughout much of Greater Iran after the Muslim conquest. Furthermore, early manuscripts of the historical Persian spoken in Mashhad during the transition from Middle to New Persian show that their origins lie in Sistan, in present-day Afghanistan.

=== Religion ===
Various scholars have recorded the Zoroastrian and Buddhist pre-Islamic heritage of the Tajik people. Early temples for fire worship have been found in Balkh and Bactria, and excavations in present-day Tajikistan and Uzbekistan have revealed remnants of Zoroastrian fire temples.

Today, the great majority of Tajiks follow Sunni Islam, although small Twelver and Ismaili Shia minorities also exist in scattered pockets. Areas with large numbers of Shias include the provinces of Herat and Badakhshan in Afghanistan, the Gorno-Badakhshan Autonomous Province in Tajikistan, and the Tashkurgan Tajik Autonomous County in China. Some of the most famous Islamic scholars came from regions that are now or historically part of East Iran, lying in present-day Afghanistan, Tajikistan, Uzbekistan, and Turkmenistan, and can therefore arguably be regarded as Tajik. These include Abu Hanifa, Imam Bukhari, Tirmidhi, Abu Dawood, Nasir Khusraw, and many others.

According to a 2009 U.S. State Department release, the population of Tajikistan is 98% Muslim (approximately 85% Sunni and 5% Shia). In Afghanistan, the great majority of Tajiks adhere to Sunni Islam. A small number of Tajiks may follow Twelver Shia Islam; the Farsiwan are one such group.

In 2009, Tajikistan marked the year by commemorating the Tajik Sunni Muslim jurist Abu Hanifa, whose ancestry hailed from Parwan Province in Afghanistan, and hosted an international symposium that drew scientific and religious leaders. In October 2009, it was announced that one of the world's largest mosques, funded by Qatar, would be built in Dushanbe, with construction expected to be completed by 2014.

== Recent developments ==
=== Cultural revival ===
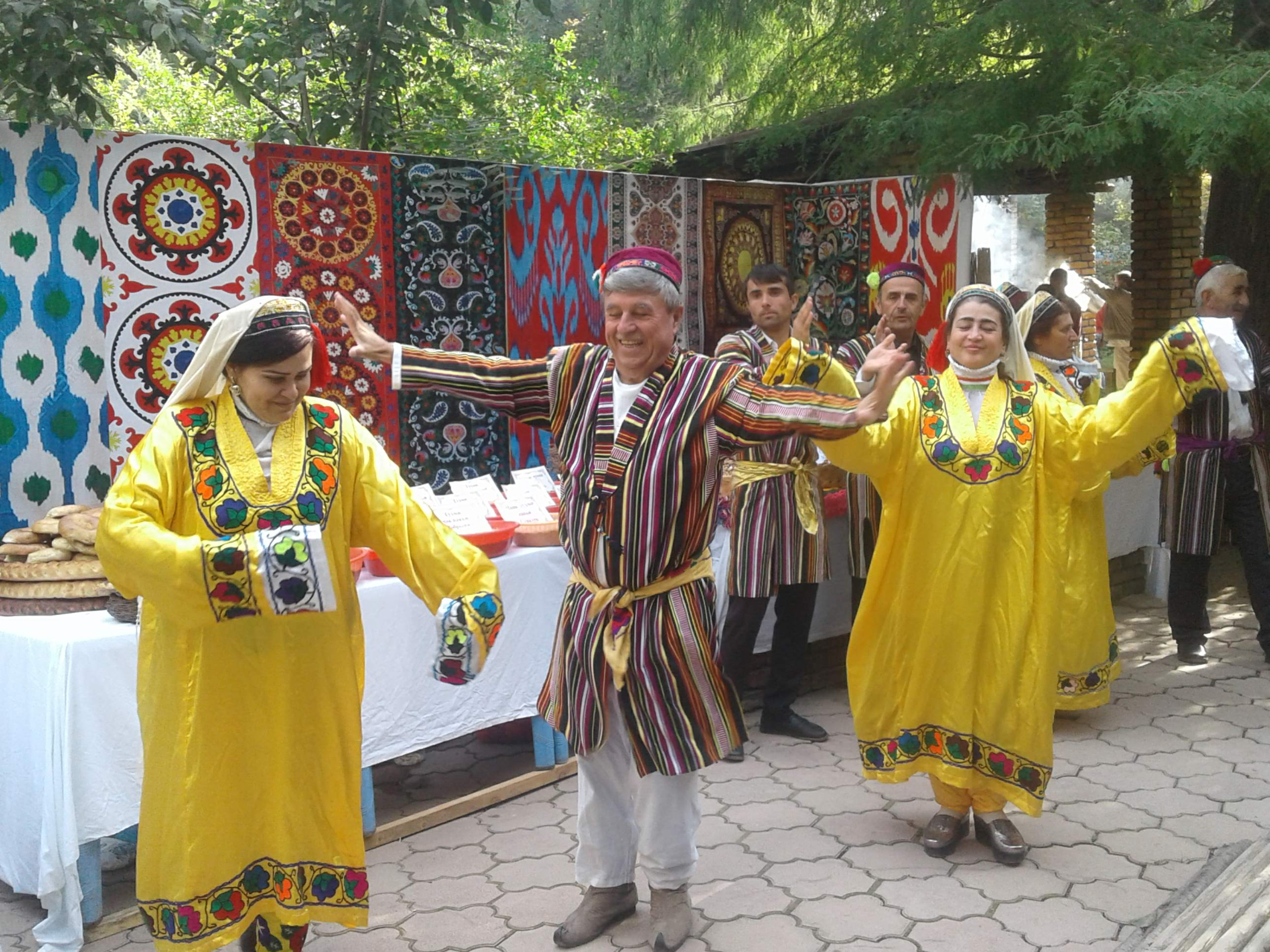
Tajiks celebrating Mehregan in Dushanbe park.

The collapse of the Soviet Union and the Civil War in Afghanistan both gave rise to a resurgence in Tajik nationalism across the region, including an attempt to revert to the Perso-Arabic script in Tajikistan. Furthermore, Tajikistan in particular has been a focal point for this movement, and the government there has made a conscious effort to revive the legacy of the Samanid Empire, the first Tajik-dominated state in the region after the Arab advance. For instance, the President of Tajikistan, Emomali Rahmon, dropped the Russian suffix "-ov" from his surname and directed others to adopt Tajik names when registering births. According to a government announcement in October 2009, approximately 4,000 Tajik nationals had dropped "ov" and "ev" from their surnames since the start of that year.

In September 2009, the Islamic Renaissance Party of Tajikistan proposed a draft law to have the nation's language referred to as 'Tajiki-Farsi' rather than 'Tajik'. The proposal drew criticism from Russian media, since the bill sought to remove the Russian language as Tajikistan's inter-ethnic lingua franca. In 1989, the original name of the language (Farsi) had been added to its official name in brackets, although Rahmon's government renamed the language to simply 'Tajiki' in 1994. On 6 October 2009, Tajikistan adopted a law that removed Russian as the lingua franca and mandated Tajik as the language to be used in official documents and education, with an exception for members of Tajikistan's ethnic minority groups, who would be permitted to receive an education in the language of their choosing.

In July 2026, Tajikistani president Emomali Rahmon ordered authorities to improve the quality of the "ancestral script" (Perso-Arabic script) of Tajiki. The move was seen as reviving Persian heritage in Tajikistan and was welcomed by Iranian groups.

== See also ==
- Timeline of Tajikistani history
- Bibliography of Tajikistani history
- Outline of Tajikistan
- List of Tajik people
- List of Tajik dynasties and states
- Chagatai people
- Kharduri people
- Tor Tajiks
- Yaghnobis
