= Kharduri people =

Semi-nomadic Tajik people

Kharduri
Total population
- 8,400 (est.)

Regions with significant populations
- Uzbekistan

Languages
- Tajik (first), Uzbek (first or second)

Religion
- Sunni Islam

Related ethnic groups
- Other Iranian peoples

The Kharduri (also Harduri or Charduri) are a group of formerly semi-nomadic Tajiks of unknown origin. They live in the Surxondaryo Region of southeastern Uzbekistan (between Boysun and Gʻuzor). The Kharduri were estimated to number about 8,400 in 1924–25.

== See also ==
- Chagatai people
