= Rohat Nabieva =

Tajikistani historian (1936–2017)

Rohat Abduvahobovna Nabieva
- Роҳат Абдуваҳҳобовна Набиева
- Born: 6 November 1936; Khujand, Tajik SSR, USSR
- Died: 4 March 2017 (aged 80); Dushanbe, Tajikistan
- Education: Tajik National University
- Scientific career
- Fields: History
- Workplaces: Tajik National University

Rohat Abduvahobovna Nabieva (Tajik: Роҳат Абдуваҳҳобовна Набиева) (6 November 1936 – 4 March 2017) was a Tajikistani historian, active in the Soviet era and after. She was among the first historians in her country to consider history through the lens of gender.

== Biography ==
Born into a working-class family in Khujand, Nabieva took her degree in history at Tajikistan State University, from whose Department of History and Philology she graduated in 1959. She remained associated with the same institution for the bulk of her academic career, first as a postgraduate student, then as an instructor, and then as an assistant professor of history in the Department of Soviet History. It was during this time, in 1967, that she joined the Communist Party of the Soviet Union. In 1975 she received her doctorate; she then became head of the Department of Tajik History at the University. Nabieva has focused, in her research, on the role played by Tajik women in various aspects of Soviet society, among them the labor force, agriculture, and industry. Among her writings are Women of Soviet Tajikistan (1967), The Patriotism of the Tajik Youth (1969), and The Share of Women in Society (1999). Later in her career she was commissioned by the Ministry of Education of the Republic of Tajikistan to work with philologist Farxod Zikriyoyev to write textbooks covering the post-independence period of Tajikistan's history. The 9th grade text was published in 2001; that for the 11th grade followed in 2006. Nabieva received numerous awards for her work over the course of her career; among these are the Order of the Presidium of the Academy of Sciences of Tajikistan and the Honorary Order of the Presidium of the Supreme Soviet of Tajikistan.
