= Mikhail Khudyakov =

Soviet historian and archaeologist (1894–1936)

Mikhail Georgievich Khudyakov (Russian: Михаил Георгиевич Худяков; September 3, 1894 in Malmyj — executed December 19, 1936 in Leningrad) – is a Soviet archaeologist, researcher of history and culture of the Volga basin peoples. His main works are on the history of Tatars, Volga Bulgaria, archeology of Kazan.

== Life and work ==
M.G. Khudyakov was born in a small town of Malmyzha of Vyatka province, in an old and prosperous Russian merchant family. He graduated from the 1st Kazan Gymnasium with a gold medal (1906–1913), studied at the History and Philology Faculty of Kazan University (1913–1918). In 1918—1924 he worked in Kazan: school teacher, librarian at Kazan University History, Archeology, and Ethnography Society, from 1919 — curator of the Archaeological Department, then a head of the Historical and Archaeological Department of the Provincial Puseum, he lectured at the North-Eastern Archaeological and Ethnographic Institute. Since 1920 he also worked in the museum department of the Tatar ASSR People's Commissariat of Education. He was one of organizers and secretaries of the Scientific Society for Tatar Studies. He participated in creation of a museum in his native Malmyj. In 1920s, he published a number of historical, ethnographic, and archaeological works about history of the Turkic and Finno-Ugric peoples of the region. His book “Essays on the History of the Kazan Khanate”, published in 1923, gained a scientific prominence.

Khudyakov's work was one of the first works by the Russian historians on the subject of the Kazan Khanate, which history penned by the previous generations' historians addressed exclusively the context of the Russian history. His view differed from that of previous authors by the author's sympathy to the Bulgaro-Tatar people and traced the Moscow state's policy as aggressive and colonial. He demonstrated a scientific objectivity. His work expressed his gratitude to a number of orientalists, who to some extent shared his vision: Gayaz Maksudov and G.S. Gubaidullin, N.N. Firsov, M.I. Lopatkin, S.G. Vakhidov.

In 1923, a prominent Bolshevik M. Kh. Sultan-Galiev was denounced on charges of nationalism, some of the Tatar autonomy's government members refused to condemn Sultan-Galiyev, and the Tatar government was dissolved. Khudyakov left Kazan after those events. From 1925, he lived and worked in Leningrad as a research fellow at the State Public Library. In 1926—1929 he took a post-graduate course in the State Academy of History of Material Culture (GAIMK). In 1927, he joined an expedition to the Chuvashia's Middle Volga area. In the 1920s he was recording Udmurt epos. From 1929 he lectured at the Leningrad University, from 1931 he was an assistant professor at the Historical and Linguistic Institute (LILI) and at the Institute of Philosophy, Literature and History (LIFLI) in Leningrad. In 1929—1933 he was a scientific secretary and a research associate at the USSR Academy of Sciences' Study Commission on Tribal Composition of the USSR Population. From 1931, he was a lead researcher at the Institute of the Pre-Class Society (GAIMK), in 1933 he joined the Department of Early Feudalism.

In 1930–32, Khudyakov was accused in “Turkic nationalism” and “Sultangalievism”, which did not extend beyond public “scalding”. In 1931, he participated in “criticism” of the arrested archaeologist S.I. Rudenko. He actively advocated in favor for the state enforcement of the Marrism. In 1936, without having to present a thesis, he was bestowed a PhD degree in the Historical Sciences and a title of an active member of the Pre-Class Society Institute (GAIMK).

And on September 9, 1936, he was arrested by the Leningrad provincial department of the NKVD under the Russian SFSR Penal Code Articles 58-8 (terrorism) and 11 (hostile organization) as an “active participant in the counterrevolutionary Trotskyite-Zinoviev terrorist organization”. On December 19, 1936, a field session of the Supreme Council of the USSR Armed Forces sentenced him to death with confiscation of all his private property. On the same day, in Leningrad, he was shot to death. All works of M.G. Khudyakov were outlawed, had to be destroyed, and stripped from all libraries.

In 1957, M.G. Khudyakov was rehabilitated, but his works were not reprinted. The first step in returning his works from the non-existence was a publication in 1989 of some of his works in the Tatar language (“Essays on the history of the Kazan Khanate” and some individual articles) in the youth magazine “Idel (Volga)”. A second edition of the book was printed in 1991.
