= Murivat Bekhnazarov =

Tajikistani artist

Murivat Bekhnazarov (Tajik: Муриват Бекназаров, Persian: مروت بک‌نظرف) (1943–) is a Tajikistani artist.

== Information ==
A Member of the Union of artists of Tajikistan, his works are held in museums and private collections of Tajikistan, Europe, Asia and USA. Murivat Bekhnazarov is known for his sensuous and exotic colors that accentuate reality through his paintings. He is a current member of the Union of artists of Tajikistan. He is also an honored artist of the Republic of Tajikistan. He was born in the year of 1943. He was born and grew up in the area of the Vanj region of Gorno-Badakhshon province. He received his education from Olimov State art College in Dushanbe in the year of 1965. He continued his education in Estonia and graduated from Estonian Academy of Arts in Tallinn in the year of 1970.
