= Hadisa Qurbonova =

Tajikistan poet

- Born: February 17, 1940 (age 86); Khavaling, Kulob District
- Occupations: Poet; playwright

Hadisa Qurbonova (born 17 February 1940), sometimes known by the mononym Hadisa, is a Tajikistani poet and playwright. She was named National Poet of Tajikistan in 2010.

== Life and career ==
Qurbonova was born in Khavaling, Kulob District, and raised in an orphanage. In 1963, she graduated from Tajikistan State University, and in 1965 from the correspondence division of the Moscow Institute of Polygraphy. In the intervening years she worked at Irfon Publishers; in 1965 she took a job with the journal Pioniri Tojikiston, remaining there until 1967. She was an editor of the State Committee for Radio and Television from 1967 until 1974, in which year she became an editor of the State Committee on Polygraphy and Books. She joined the Communist Party of the Soviet Union in 1977, and the Union of Soviet Writers in 1978. Qurbonova's early poems began to appear in the 1960s. They take as their themes such subjects as love and patriotism. She has since written a number of plays as well, dealing with contemporary topics. She has remained an active part of Tajikistan's literary life since the country gained its independence in 1991, appearing at literary festivals and editing the work of younger writers. She has 3 daughters (Nodira, Nazira and Madina) and 7 grandchildren (Maruf, Komron, Kamilla, Nokhid, Shohina, Siyovush, Mukhammad).

== Awards and honours ==
- 2010, National Poet of Tajikistan

== Selected works ==
=== Poetry ===
- Paimon (Pact, 1972)
- Shukrona (Thanksgiving, 1980)
- Nuri Oktiobr (The Light of October, 1981)
- Dargohi Oftob (The Threshold of the Sun, 1986)
- Dunioi Javoni (The Youth World, 1967).

=== Plays ===
- Munisa (Munisa, 1976)
- Duroha (Fork in the Road, 1978)
- Mash'ali Jovid (Eternal Flame, 1984)
