= Ozod Aminova =

Soviet-Tajikistani poet (1933–2009)

Ozod Muhiddinovna Aminova (1 October 1933 – 7 June 2009) was a Soviet-Tajikistani poet, sometimes known by the mononym Ozod.

Born in Khujand, then called Leninabad, Aminova was the daughter of poet and musician Muhiddin Aminzoda. She graduated from the Pedagogical Institute in Khujand in 1958, and taught at local schools in that town until 1970; in that year she joined the Communist Party of the Soviet Union. In 1971, she became the editor of the local newspaper, Haqiqati Leninabad, remaining in this position until 1990, in which year she became an advisor to the local branch of the Writers' Union of Tajikistan, of which she had been a member since 1965. She also chaired the local Culture Fund. Aminova began publishing her work in the mid-1950s. She joined the Union of Writers of Tajikistan in 1965, and in 1982 won the Tajikistan Komsomol's Prize for her work. She also received the Honorary Order of the Presidium of the Supreme Soviets of Tajikistan and Azerbaijan. Aminova takes as the theme of her work such subjects as patriotism, love, loyalty, and the freedom of Soviet women. Much of her work was translated into Russian, and some poems were translated into the languages of other Soviet republics.

== Publications ==
- Satrhoi Nakhustin (The First Lines, 1965)
- Ba Yodi Tu (Thinking of You, 1971)
- Chashmi Bidor (Wakeful Eye, 1975)
- Didori Sahro (A Visit to the Fields, 1975, written to honor engineer Dilbarniso Nurmatova)
- Modarnoma (In Praise of Mother, 1981)
- Piroyai Sabz (Green Ornament, 1983)
- Man Ham Maktabkhon Shudam (I, Too, Became Learned, 1981)
- Guldasta (Bouquet, 1984)
