= Muhammad Asimi =

Tajik philosopher, soldier, poet, and academic

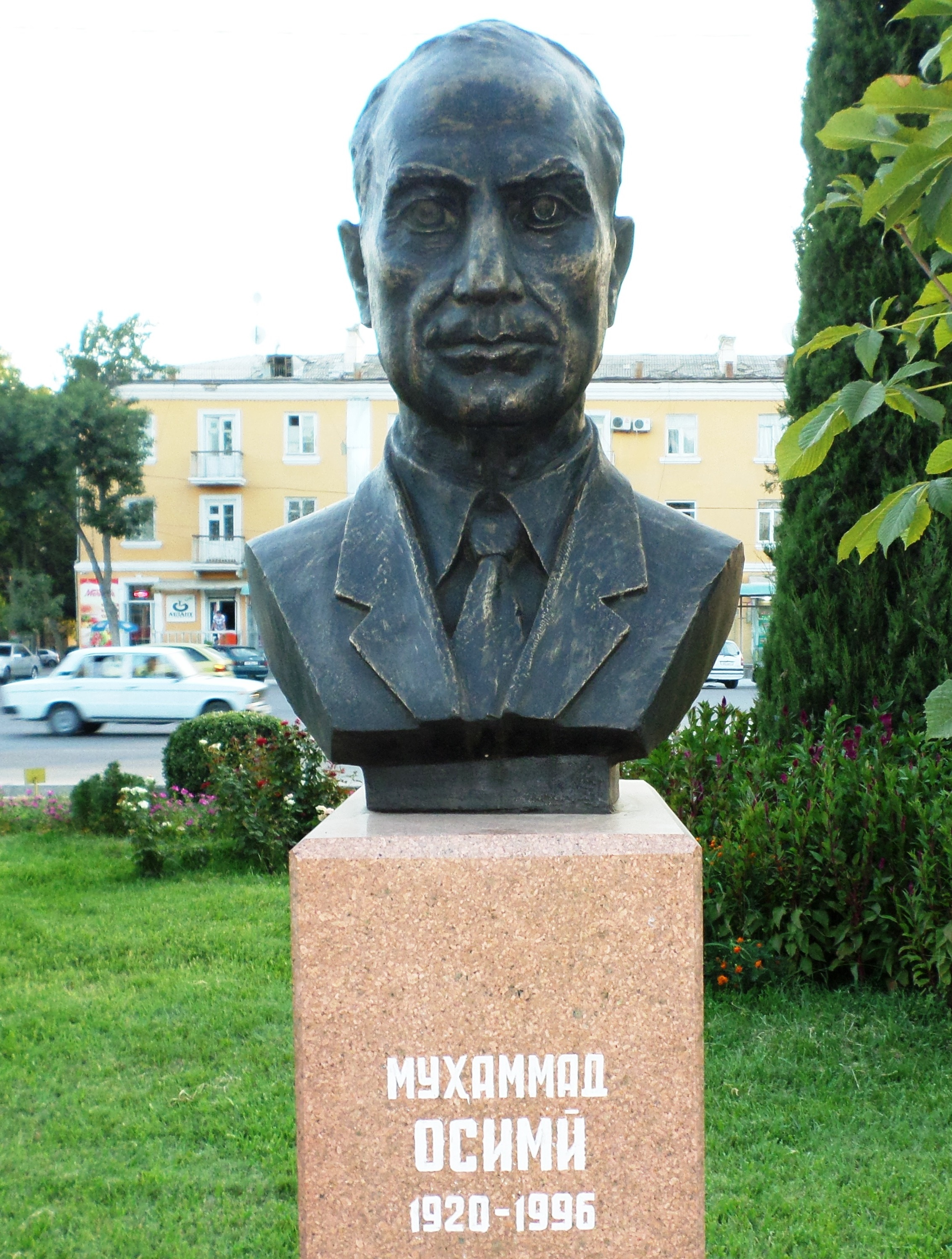

Muhammad Asimi (September 1, 1920 – July 29, 1996), was a Soviet and Tajik philosopher, soldier, poet, and academic.

Born in Khujand, Asimi graduated from Samarkand State University (1941). In 1990 he founded the Payvand (Пайванд) Society, a cultural organization for scholarly relations between the Persian-speaking peoples, for which he was active until his death.

Asimi was killed in Dushanbe on 29 July 1996 during the Tajikistani Civil War. A documentary was released in 2018, by Emmy award winner Chris Schueler, covering his life and accomplishments.

== Selected bibliography ==
- Material and Physical Description of the World, 1966
- Russian-Tajik dictionary, 1966
- Satiser and the World's Physical Image, 1966
- Origin of Philosophical Thinking, 1970
- Avicenna and world culture, Journal of peoples of Asia and Africa, 1980
- Traditional progress socioeconomic role, 1987
- Historical Progress of socialist nations, 1987
- IV: The age of achievement: AD 750 to the end of the fifteenth century - Part One: The historical, social and economic setting, Paris 1998 (General and Regional Histories)
- Connecting Hearts Connecting Generations
- Osimī, Muḥammad S. Ethnic history of Central Asia in the 2nd millennium BC: Soviet studies. Tipogr. Izd. Nauka, 1977.
- Khān, Muḥammad Ḥakīm, Akhror Mukhtarov, and Muḣammad Osimī. Muntakhab al-tavārīkh. Akādimī-i ʻUlūm-i Tājīkistān-i Shūravī, Instītū-yi Tārīkh bi-nām-i Aḥmad Dānish, 1983.
- Asimi, Muhammad, and Instituti Sharqshinosi Tojikiston. "Aktual Nye Problemy Filosofskoi I Obshchestvennoi Mysli Zarubezhnogo Vostoka Materialy Pervogo Vsesoiuznogo Koordinatsionnogo Soveshchaniia." (1983).
- Hān, Muḥammad Ḥakīm, Achror M. Muchtarov, and Muḩammad Osimī. Muntachab at-tavarich: v 2 knigach. Izdat. Doniš, 1983.
- Osimī, Muḩammad. Tadshikistan. APN-Verlag, 1987.
- De Laet, S. J., A. H. Dani, M. A. Al-Bakhit, J. L. Lorenzo, Muḣammad Osimī, Louis Bazin, R. B. Nunoo et al. History of Humanity: From the Seventh Century to the Sixteenth Century. Routledge, 2000.
- Osimī, Muḩammad. Tašakkul wa takāmul-i afkār-i falsafī. ʻIrfān, 1981.
- Al-Asimi, Muhammad Saud Muhammad. "Depository institutions: Reforms along the lines of Islamic banking principles." (1995): 1052-1052.
- Asimi, Muhammad, Ibrahimovich(father's name) and Instituti Sharqshinosi Tojikiston. "Aktual Nye Problemy Filosofskoi I Obshchestvennoi Mysli Zarubezhnogo Vostoka Materialy Pervogo Vsesoiuznogo Koordinatsionnogo Soveshchaniia." (1983).
