= Ruslan Kurbanov =

Ruslan Kurbanov or Qurbanov may refer to:

- Ruslan Kurbanov (activist) (born 1976), Russian activist
- Ruslan Kurbanov (fencer) (born 1991), Kazakhstani fencer
- Ruslan Kurbanov (triple jumper) (born 1993), Uzbekistani triple jumper
- Ruslan Qurbanov (born 1991), Russian football player
