= Suleiman Sharifi =

Tajikistani artist

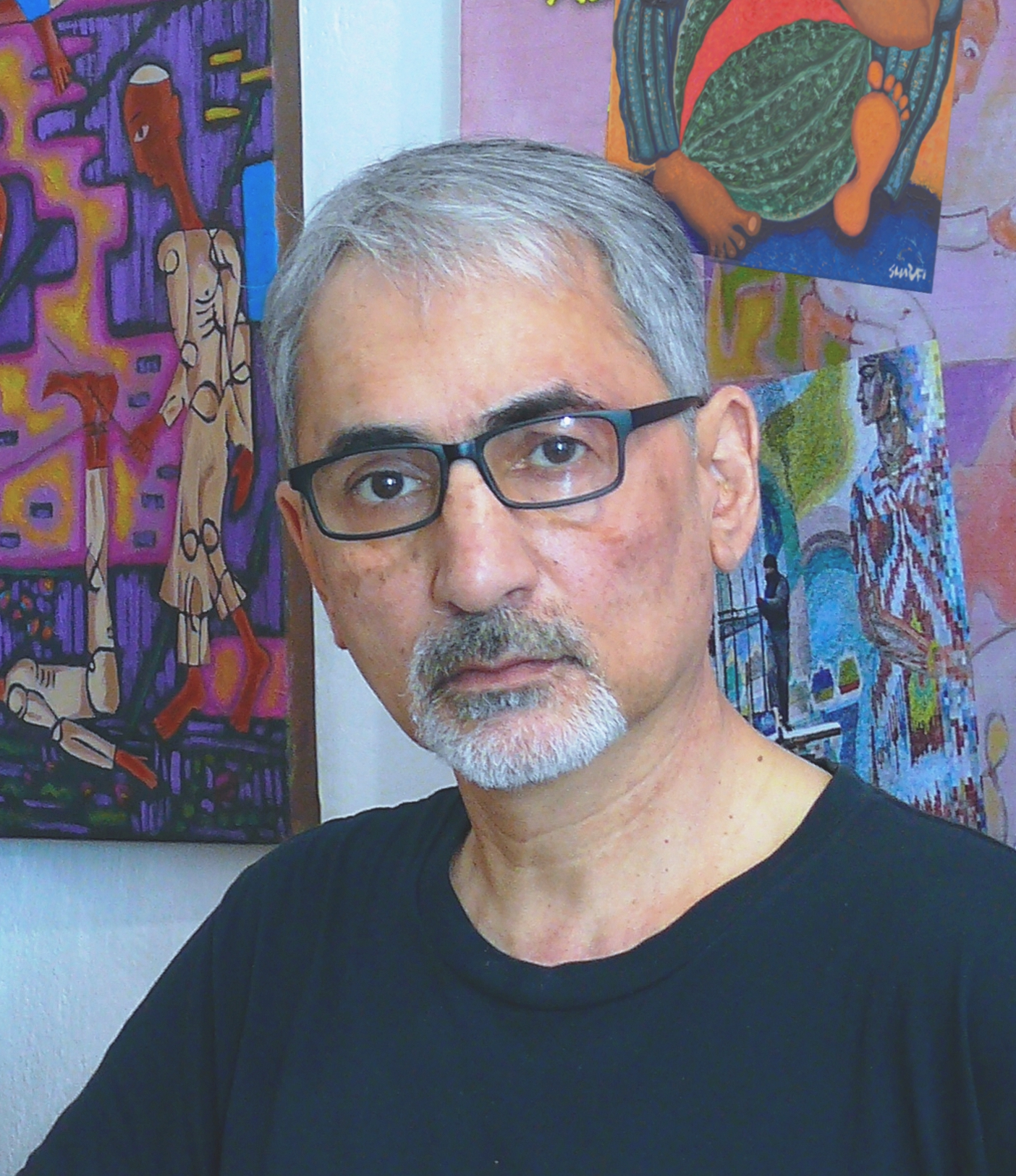
Suleiman Sharifi

Suleiman Sharifi (born 1958) is a Tajikistani artist. A Member of the Union of Artists of Tajikistan, his works are held in museums and private collections of Tajikistan, Russia, Europe and Asia.
