= Zulfiya Atoulloeva =

Soviet poet, writer and journalist (born 1954)

Zulfiya Atoulloeva (Tajik: Зулфия Атоуллоева), also known under the pen name Zulfiya Atoy (Tajik: Зулфия Атоӣ), (born 15 June 1954) is a Tajikistani poet and journalist.

Atoulloeva was born in the village of Qalai Aini, Ghonchi District in Sughd province, Tajikistan. She graduated from the Maxim Gorky Literature Institute in Moscow in 1977, at which time she joined the staff of Tojikiston Soveti (and remained there until 1983). In that year she moved to Zanoni Tojikiston, where she worked for two years. In 1985, she became the acting editor of Gozetai Muallimon. She has since held numerous journalistic posts, including being chief editor of the journals Firuza and Guftugu. She became a member of the Communist Party of the Soviet Union in 1982, having joined the Union of Writers of the USSR in 1979. Atoulleva first published her poetry in 1967, when it appeared in Bairaqi Oktiobr; it has since appeared in other publications as well. Her work is primarily lyrical, dealing with such subjects as patriotism, love, family, and happiness. In addition to Tajik, she writes in Persian and Russian, and her work has been translated into Russian, English, French, German, Arabic, Ukrainian, and Kyrgyz, among other languages. For her work, both as a journalist and as a poet, Atoulloeva has received numerous awards during her career, being named both a Distinguished Tajik Journalist and a Distinguished Contributor to Tajik Education and having received the Tajikistan Youth Prize. She was named a National Poet of Tajikistan in 2010.

== Works ==
Taken from

- Ҷиҳоз (1977)
- Дидор (1980)
- Меваи сабр (1982)
- Зочаи хушрўи ман (1984)
- Духтари дарё (1986)
- Ишқи як зан (1992)
- Ситораи ваҳшӣ (in Persian, 1997)
- Ситораи Муштарӣ (1998)
- Зан агар ошиқ шавад (2001)
- Зулфи парешон (in two volumes, 2002)
- Паррандаи баҳорӣ (in Russian, 2004)
- Сояи зулф (2005)
- Девони зулф (2009)

Her work has also been anthologized, beginning in 1973, and she has also edited numerous volumes of verse.
