= Falak music =

Music genre

Falak (literally "heaven," "fate," "universe") is a style of music native to the Pamir Mountains of Central Asia, particularly the Badakhshan region of northeastern Afghanistan, southeastern Tajikistan, and northern Pakistan. Falak lyrics can involve religious-mystical themes of divine love, separation and reunion (often drawn from Persian Sufi poetry), or secular and melancholy lyrics of human love and suffering.

== Music theory ==
Falak music is generally in a descending scale, with a range often limited to a hexachord (six notes).

== Instrumentation ==
Falak may be sung a cappella, accompanied by instruments, or instrumental. Falak instruments include the ghijak (spike fiddle), nay (Persian flute), and dombura (long-necked lute), as well as percussion instruments.
