= Timur Zulfikarov =

Russian poet (born 1936)

Timur Zulfiqorov
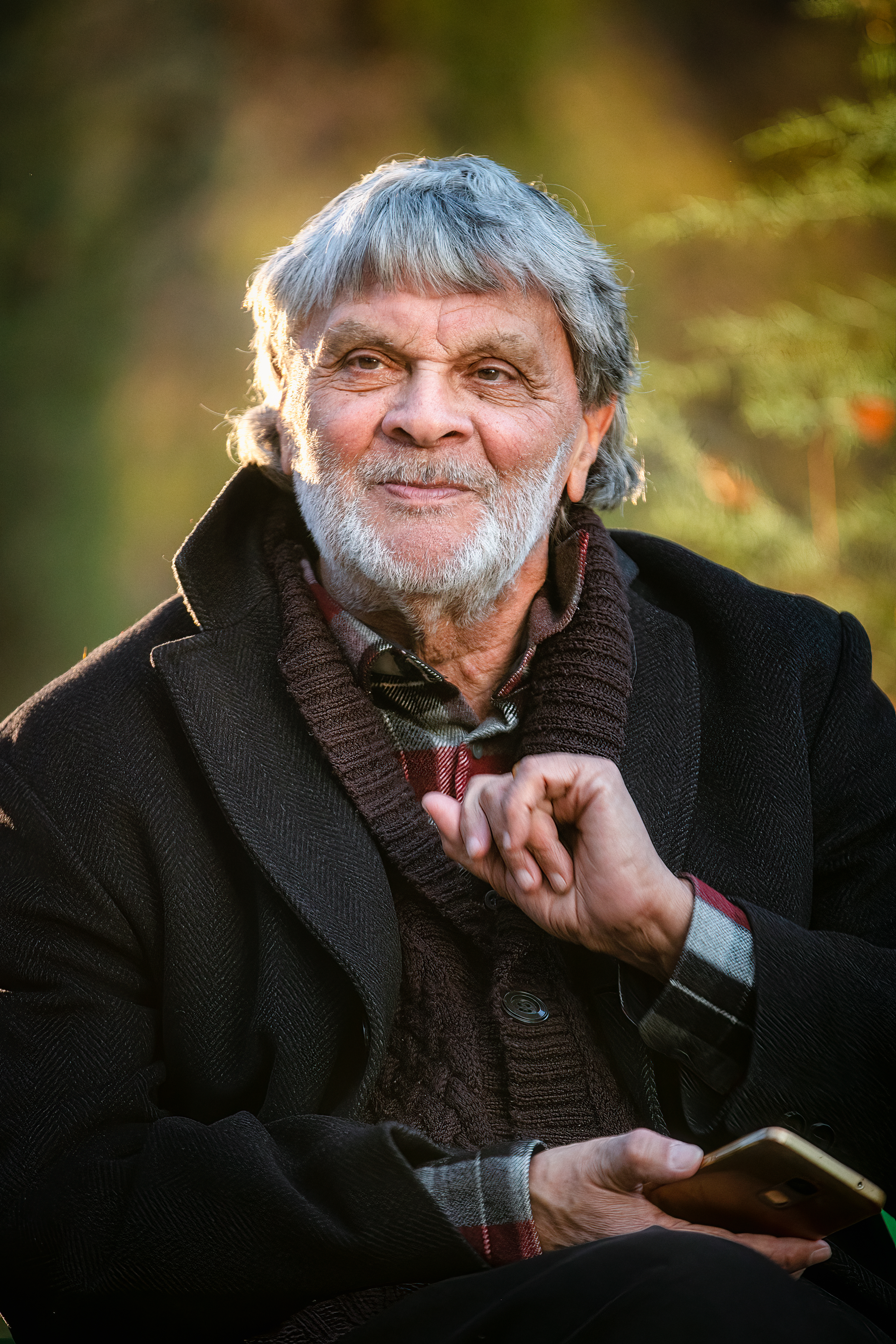
- Born: 17 August 1936 (age 90); Dushanbe, Tajikistan

Timur Zulfiqorov (Russian/Tajik:Тимур Зульфикаров/Темур Зулфиқоров) (born 17 August 1936) is a Russian / Tajik poet, playwright, and novelist. He was born in Dushanbe, Tajikistan.

== Writing and awards ==
He was the winner of the Ivan Bunin Award for his work Zolotye Pismena Lyubvi (The Golden Letters of Love). The Nika Prize in 2001 was awarded to a romance to Zulfikarov's lyrics for the art-house melodrama Listen, Is It Raining? performed by singer Lina Mkrtchyan, and written by composer Isaac Schwartz. He has also worked as a writer for movies like Mirazhi Iyubvi (1987) and Tasfiya (2017).

== Works ==
Gyron and Nolon on the Shipyard of Water.

- Poems of Wanderings (1980)
- Two Legends of Love (1980)
- Sages, Kings, Poets (1983)
- Emirs, Sages, Poets (1983)
- Tattabubu (1984)
- The First Love of Khoja Nasreddin (1985)
- The Hunt of King Bahram Gur the Sassanid (1986)
- The Earthly and Heavenly Wanderings of a Poet (1990)
- Love, Wisdom, and the Death of a Dervish (1990)
- The Book of the Death of Amir Timur (1998)
- The Scarlet Gypsy (1999)
- The Azure Wanderer (Songs of Russia and Asia) (2002)
- The Stone of the Apocalypse (2003)
- Golden Parables of a Dervish (2004)
- Golden Parables of Khoja Nasreddin (2004)
- The Coral Viper (2005)
- The Book of the Childhood of Jesus Christ (2006)
- A Bitter Conversation Between Two Golden-Tongued Sages Amidst Wild Honey-Scented Herbs (2006)
- The Wanderings of Khoja Nasreddin in the 21st Century: The New Teachings of an Ancient Sage (2021)
