= Tajik National University =

Public university in Dushanbe, Tajikistan

- Russian: Таджикский национальный университет Tajik: Донишгоҳи Миллии Тоҷикистон
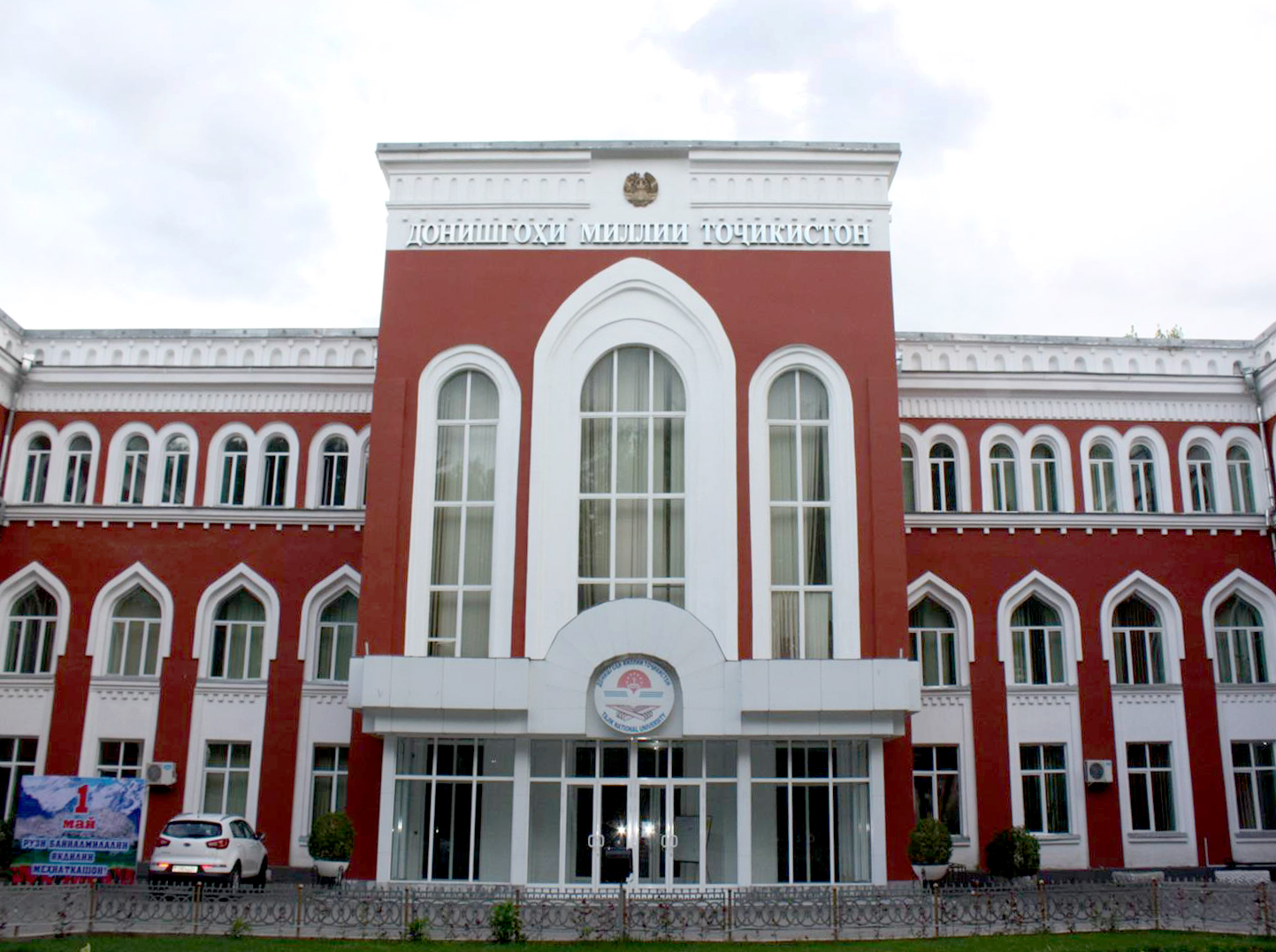
- Motto in English: To learn, To Educate, To Enlighten
- Type: National
- Established: 21 March 1947; 79 years ago
- Affiliations: IAU, EUA, WHO
- Rector: doctor of law professor Nasriddinzoda Emomali Sayfiddin
- Faculty: 2299
- Students: 22661
- Doctoral students: 3,200
- Location: Rudaki str. 17, 734025, Dushanbe, Tajikistan
- Campus: 49 hectares (~121 acres); Urban
- Language: Tajik, Russian, English
- Website: www.tnu.tj

University rankings

Regional – Overall
- QS Emerging Europe and Central Asia: 21-23 (2024)

Tajik National University (Note: Russian: Таджикский национальный университет, romanized: Tadzhikskiy natsionalʹnyy universitet; Tajik: Донишгоҳи Миллии Тоҷикистон, romanized: Donishgohi Milliyi Tojikiston) is one of the largest university in Central Asia and the only national university in Tajikistan. It has been ranked as one of the most prestigious universities in Central Asia since its inception.

The head office of the university is located in the capital city of Tajikistan.

Tajik National University prepares extensive human resources for the economy of Tajikistan, from medical doctors to finance professionals and journalists. President Emomali Rahmon and the former chairman of the National Bank of Tajikistan Murodali Alimardon are alumni. TNU is the flagship university of Tajikistan. Uniquely, the university is directly funded by the government while also being more independent of it compared to other state universities.

In Central Asia, Tajik National University has the second largest volume of publications and citations in the scientific database Scopus and the Hirsch index, with the best academic results in the faculty of Medicine.

== History ==
1947 – Tajik State University (Resolution of the Council of Ministers of USSR from 21.03.1947, № 643).

1997 – Tajik National University named after V.l. Lenin (TSNU) (Decree of the President of the Republic of Tajikistan from 15.02.1997, № 669).

2008 – Tajik National University (TNU) (Decree of the President of the Republic of Tajikistan from 28.10.2008, № 556).

== Facilities ==
The university encompasses a publishing house, a research library, a botanical garden, a hostel, 114 departments (107 special departments), a University Hospital and a high school. For the industrial and practical training of students in the establishment, the functioning educational and production bases are Takob, Ziddi and Javoni.

The university has 198 doctors and professors and 632 candidates of sciences. TNU has 8 dissertation councils made up of 26 people.

Its scientific library has 945,000 copies of scientific, educational, fiction and periodicals.

TNU Research Institutes offers 110 research laboratories, an electronic library with access to more than 12 million digital online sources, medical laboratories, a bio-technology Centre, the Techno Park, the Center for Language Studies, the Cultural Education Center “Confucius”, and the Center of periodicals, printing and translation center. For the medical faculty, many additional laboratories (anatomy, pathology labs, etc.) are available.

== Academic departments ==
- Faculty of Medicine
- Faculty of Dentistry
- Faculty of Pharmacy
- Faculty of Biology
- Faculty of Physics
- Faculty of Chemistry
- Faculty of Mechanics and Mathematics
- Faculty of Geology
- Faculty of International Relations
- Faculty of History
- Faculty of Law
- Faculty of Philosophy
- Faculty of Philology
- Faculty of Russian Philology
- Faculty of Asia and European languages
- Faculty of Journalism
- Faculty of Economics and Management
- Faculty of Finance and Economy
- Faculty of Accounting and Economics
- Joint faculty of TNU and Belarusian university

== Notable alumni ==
- Salimjon Aioubov – journalist, reporter and writer
- Turdikhon Berdieva – linguist and orientalist
- Guljahon Bobosodiqova – Deputy of the Supreme Soviet of the Tajik SSR and the Supreme Soviet of the USSR
- Sherali Khayrulloyev – former Minister of Defense of Tajikistan.
- Rohat Nabieva - Historian, wrote Women of Soviet Tajikistan (1967)
- Umarali Quvvatov – an outspoken critic of veteran Tajik leader Emomali Rahmon
- Emomali Rahmon – current president of Tajikistan
