= Hindou Oumarou Ibrahim =

Environmental activist and geographer

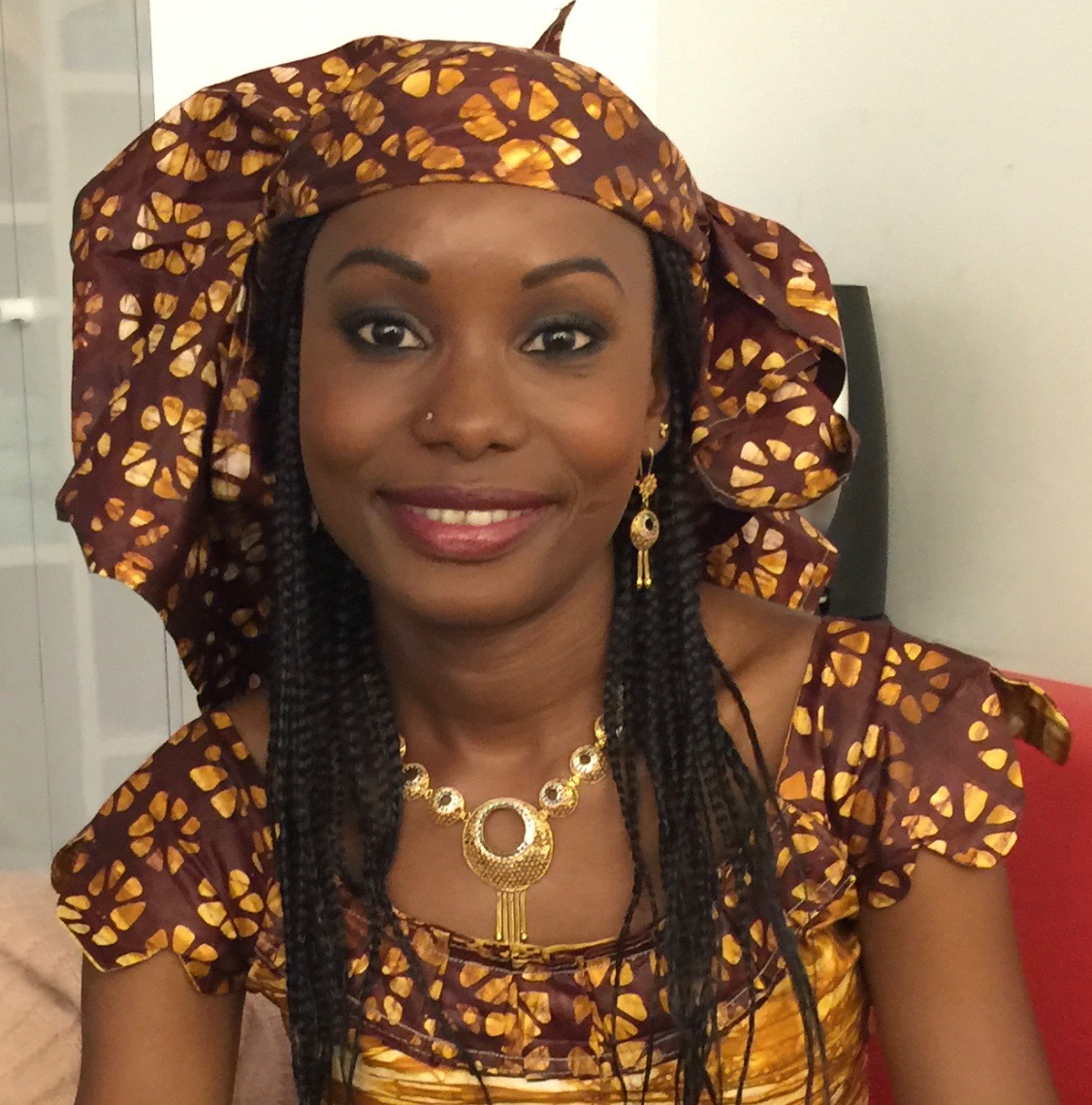
- Born: 1984 (age 41–42); Chad
- Occupation: Environmental Activist
- Organization(s): Association of Peul Women and Autochthonous Peoples of Chad (AFPAT)
- Board member of: International Indigenous Peoples Forum on Climate Change; Pan-African Alliance Climate Justice (PACJA); Policy Board United Nations: Indigenous Peoples Partnership (UNIPP); Indigenous Peoples of Africa Coordinating Committee (IPACC)
- Awards: National Geographic Emerging Explorer

Hindou Oumarou Ibrahim is a Chadian environmental activist and geographer. She is the Coordinator of the Association of Peul Women and Autochthonous Peoples of Chad (AFPAT) and served as the co-director of the pavilion of the World Indigenous Peoples’ Initiative and Pavilion at COP21, COP22 and COP23.

== Activism and advocacy ==
Ibrahim is an environmental activist working on behalf of her people, the Mbororo in Chad. She was educated in Chad's capital city of N'Djamena and spent her holidays with the indigenous Mbororo people, who are traditionally nomadic farmers, herding and tending cattle. During the course of her education, she became aware of the ways in which she was discriminated against as an indigenous woman and also of the ways in which her Mbororo counterparts were excluded from the educational opportunities she received. So in 1999, she founded the Association of Indigenous Peul Women and Peoples of Chad (AFPAT), a community-based organization focused on promoting the rights of girls and women in the Mbororo community and inspiring leadership and advocacy in environmental protection. The organization received its operating license in 2005 and has since participated in international negotiations on climate, sustainable development, biodiversity, and environmental protection.

Her focus on environmental advocacy stemmed from her firsthand experience of the effects of global climate change on the Mbororo community, who rely on natural resources for their own survival and for the survival of the animals they care for. For years, they have been experiencing the effects of Lake Chad drying up; the lake is a vital source of water for people from Chad, Cameroon, Niger and Nigeria, and is now 10% of its size from the 1960s. In a written testimony to the International Organization for Migration, Ibrahim emphasized that her people, and indigenous communities like her own, are "direct victims of climate change," which has worked to displace them, forcing them to abandon their own lands in search of ones that can sustain their way of life. In that testimony, she also spoke of the consequences of climate change migration, which disproportionately leaves migrant communities vulnerable.

Ibrahim has written on the importance of recognizing indigenous people's rights when crafting global climate change for a variety of outlets, including Quartz and the World Economic Forum's Agenda. Of particular concern to Ibrahim is the legal right of indigenous peoples to own and manage the lands where they live. Such legal rights guarantee that indigenous community have legal agency in economic developments that might displace them, such as oil drilling projects, mining, and hydropower plants.

Ibrahim has worked collaboratively with UNESCO and the Indigenous Peoples of Africa Coordinating Committee (IPACC) on a project to 3D map Chad's Sahel desert region, where 250,000 Mbororos currently live, relying on subsistence farming. The project combined 3D mapping technologies with indigenous scientific knowledge to develop a tool to sustainably manage the environment and empower indigenous voices—particularly those of women—to make decisions on planning for a future of climate adaptation and mitigation. Ibrahim in her December 2019 TED talk on the impact of climate change said that while creating the 3D mapping Ibrahim was able to bring in women's voices into the decision-making and also give the men their respect as accorded by her tradition. Women were able to identify where they gathered the medicine and where they collected food which the men agreed to by nodding their heads. and explained how our grandmother can tell about the weather forecast, animal immigration, size of fruit, and behaviours of her own cattle by observing her environment. In an interview with BBC for BBC's 100 Women project, Ibrahim noted: "Every culture has a science. So it's really important for the indigenous voice to be there."

In 2016, Ibrahim was selected to represent civil society at the signing of the historic Paris Climate Agreement on April 22, 2016. In her statement at the signing, she noted: "Climate change is adding poverty to poverty every day, forcing many to leave home for a better future."

In 2018, Ibrahim attended the 2018 United Nations Climate Change Conference and held a conversation with Arnold Schwarzenegger during a panel discussion. She disagreed with the opinion of Schwarzenegger that people can help to stop climate change by driving electric cars, reducing meat consumption, and other minor civilian actions. She tells Schwarzenegger that the change must come from governments and policymakers. Ibrahim says that peoples of the developing world are the primary victims of climate change despite the fact that they are not the principal contributors to carbon emissions. She also appeared as an interviewee on the Un and Africa Podcast on that event where she spoke on the importance of tech in reducing the impact of climate change on desert countries.

In 2019, she became one of the 17 people to be appointed as an advocate of Sustainable Development Goals by the United Nations. SDG which is made up of 17 goals, adopted in 2015, is the United Nations way of trying to make the world a better place while the advocates were appointed to help spread awareness and seeing to it that these goals are achieved by playing their assigned roles. Later, she attended

== Leadership ==
Ibrahim serves in a number of leadership capacities advocating for the importance of indigenous knowledge in mitigating the effects of climate change. She is co-Chair of the International Indigenous Peoples Forum on Climate Change, representing the group at the United Nations Convention to Combat Desertification (UNCCD) and of the Pan-African Alliance Climate Justice (PACJA), where she also acts as the chair of recruitment. She is also a member of the Policy Board United Nations: Indigenous Peoples Partnership (UNIPP) and of the Executive Committee for the Indigenous Peoples of Africa Coordinating Committee (IPACC).

== Awards and honors ==
In 2017, Ibrahim was recognized as a National Geographic Society Emerging Explorer, a program that recognizes and supports outstanding scientists, conservationists, storytellers, and innovators. In 2017, she was also featured as part of the BBC's 100 Women project, recognizing 100 influential and inspiring women every year. In 2018, she was listed as one of BBC's 100 Women. In 2019, she received the Pritzker Emerging Environmental Genius Award from the Pritzker Family Foundation. In 2019, Ibrahim was listed by Time Magazine as one of 15 women championing action on climate change.

In 2020, Refugees International give her 2020 Richard C. Holbrooke award for her contribution for promoting the right and interest of vulnerable communities. In 2021, Ibrahim became one of laureate of Rolex Awards for Enterprise in 2021.

== Bibliography ==
- Hindou Oumarou Ibrahim (2019). "Chapter 7: Indigenous people and the fight for survival". In Extinction Rebellion (ed.). This Is Not a Drill: An Extinction Rebellion Handbook. Penguin Books. pp. 54–57. ISBN 9780141991443.
