= Indigenous peoples of Africa =

The Native or indigenous people of Africa are groups of people native to a specific region; people who lived there before colonists or settlers arrived, defined new borders, and began to occupy the land. This definition applies to all indigenous groups, whether inside or outside of Africa. Although the vast majority of Native Africans can be considered to be "indigenous" in the sense that they originated from that continent and nowhere else (like all Homo sapiens), identity as an "indigenous people" is in the modern application more restrictive. Not every African ethnic group claims identification under these terms, such as Arabs in North Africa, Euro-Africans, and Asian Africans. Groups and communities who do claim this recognition are those who by a variety of historical and environmental circumstances have been placed outside of the dominant state systems. Their traditional practices and land claims have often come into conflict with the objectives and policies promulgated by governments, companies, and surrounding dominant societies.

Marginalization, along with the desire to recognize and protect their collective and human rights, and to maintain the continuity of their individual cultures, has led many to seek identification as indigenous peoples, in the contemporary global sense of the term. For example, in West Africa, the Dogon people of Mali and Burkina Faso, the Jola people of Guinea-Bissau, The Gambia, and Senegal, and the Serer people of Senegal, The Gambia, Guinea-Bissau, and Mauritania, and formally North Africa, have faced religious and ethnic persecution for centuries, and disenfranchisement or prejudice in modern times (see Persecution of Serers and Persecution of Dogons). These people, who are indigenous to their present habitat, are classified as indigenous peoples.

== History ==
The history of the indigenous African peoples spans thousands of years and includes a complex variety of cultures, languages, and political systems. Indigenous African cultures have existed since ancient times, with some of the earliest evidence of human life on the continent coming from stone tools and rock art dating back hundreds of thousands of years. The earliest written records of African history come from ancient Egyptian and Nubian texts, which date back to around 3000 B.C. These texts provide insight into the societies of the time, including religious beliefs, political systems, and trade networks. In the centuries that followed, various other African civilizations rose to prominence, such as the Kingdom of Kush in northern Sudan and the powerful empires of Ghana, Mali, and Songhai in West Africa. Arab conquest of Northern Africa displaced and dispossessed indigenous Berber peoples. In the late 15th century, European colonization began, leading to the further displacement of many indigenous cultures. Since the end of World War II, indigenous African cultures have been in a state of constant flux, struggling to maintain their identity in the face of Westernization and globalization. In recent years, there has been a resurgence of interest in traditional cultures and many African countries have taken steps to preserve and promote their indigenous heritage.

== "Indigenous" in the contemporary African context ==
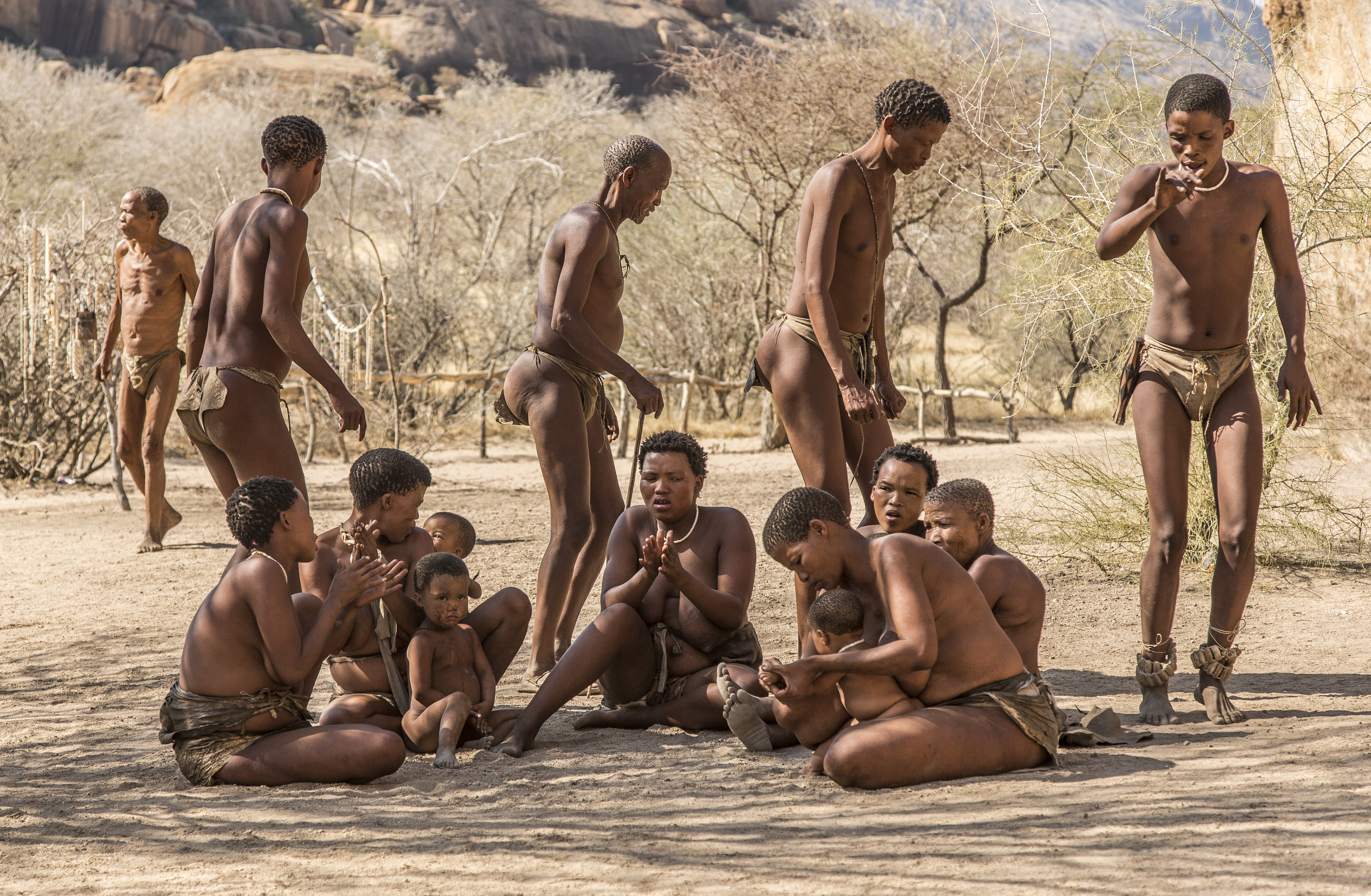
San people in Namibia

In the post-colonial period, the concept of specific indigenous peoples within the African continent has gained wider acceptance, although not without controversy. The highly diverse and numerous ethnic groups which comprise most modern, independent African states contain within them various peoples whose situation, cultures, and pastoralist or hunter-gatherer lifestyles are generally marginalized and set apart from the dominant political and economic structures of the nation. Since the late 20th century, these peoples have increasingly sought recognition of their rights as distinct indigenous peoples, in both national and international contexts.

The Indigenous Peoples of Africa Co-ordinating Committee (IPACC) was founded in 1997. It is one of the main trans-national network organizations recognized as a representative of African indigenous peoples in dialogues with governments and bodies such as the UN. In 2008, IPACC was composed of 150 member organisations in 21 African countries. IPACC identifies several key characteristics associated with indigenous claims in Africa:

- "political and economic marginalization rooted in colonialism;
- de facto discrimination often based on the dominance of agricultural peoples in the State system (e.g. lack of access to education and health care by hunters and herders);
- the particularities of culture, identity, economy and territoriality that link hunting and herding peoples to their home environments in deserts and forests (e.g. nomadism, diet, knowledge systems);
- some indigenous peoples, such as the San and Pygmy peoples, are physically distinct, which makes them subject to specific forms of discrimination."

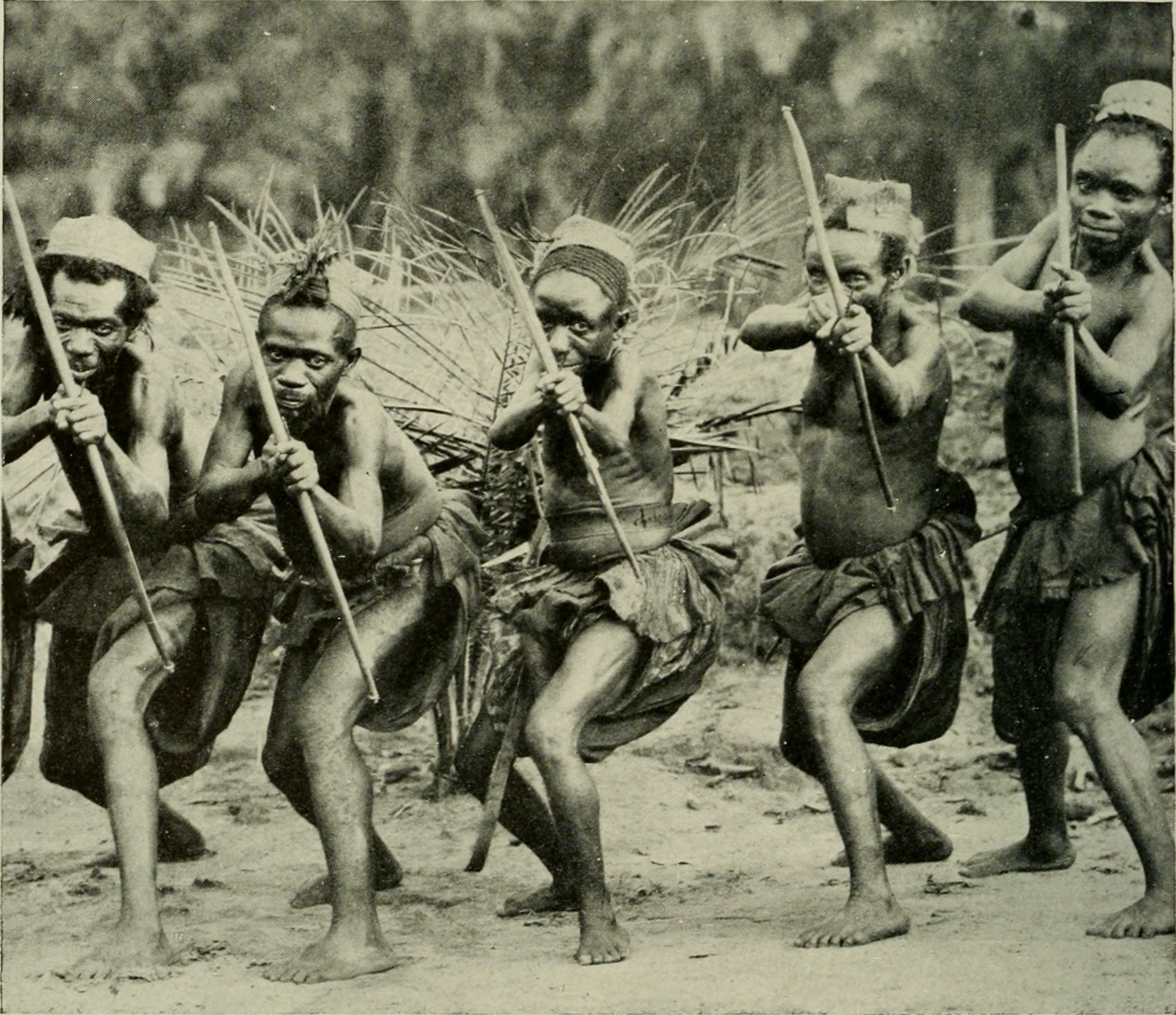
African Pygmies northeastern Congo posing with bows and arrows (c. 1915)

With respect to concerns that identifying some groups and not others as indigenous is in itself discriminatory, IPACC states that it:

- "... recognises that all Africans should enjoy equal rights and respect. All of Africa's diversity is to be valued. Particular communities, due to historical and environmental circumstances, have found themselves outside the state-system and underrepresented in governance... This is not to deny other Africans their status; it is to emphasize that affirmative recognition is necessary for hunter-gatherers and herding peoples to ensure their survival."

At an African inter-governmental level, the examination of indigenous rights and concerns is pursued by a sub-commission established under the African Commission on Human and Peoples' Rights (ACHPR), sponsored by the African Union (AU) (successor body to the Organisation of African Unity (OAU)). In late 2003, the 53 signatory states of the ACHPR adopted the Report of the African Commission's Working Group on Indigenous Populations/Communities and its recommendations. This report says in part (p. 62):

- "... certain marginalized groups are discriminated in particular ways because of their particular culture, mode of production and marginalized position within the state[; a] form of discrimination that other groups within the state do not suffer from. The call of these marginalized groups to protection of their rights is a legitimate call to alleviate this particular form of discrimination."

The adoption of this report at least notionally subscribed the signatories to the concepts and aims of furthering the identity and rights of African indigenous peoples. The extent to which individual states are mobilizing to put these recommendations into practice varies enormously, however. Most indigenous groups continue to agitate for improvements in the areas of land rights, use of natural resources, protection of environment and culture, political recognition and freedom from discrimination.

On 30 December 2010, the Republic of Congo adopted a law for the promotion and protection of the rights of indigenous peoples. This law is the first of its kind in Africa, and its adoption is a historic development for indigenous peoples on the continent.

== See also ==
- African Commission on Human and Peoples' Rights
- Black people
- Berbers
- Copts
- Hizetjitwa Indigenous Peoples' Organization (2007), an organisation operating in Namibia and Angola
- List of ethnic groups of Africa
- List of indigenous peoples of Africa
- Recent African origin of modern humans
- Technical Centre for Agricultural and Rural Cooperation ACP-EU (CTA)
- United Nations Environment Programme
- United Nations Educational Scientific Cultural Organisation (UNESCO)
