= Ruth Shack =

American politician (1931–2026)

- Shack in 2016

Member of the Metro-Dade County Commission from the 4th district
- In office 1976–1986
- Preceded by: Sandy Rubenstein
- Succeeded by: Sherman Winn

Personal details
- Born: August 24, 1931 New York City, U.S.
- Died: May 23, 2026 (aged 94) Cumming, Georgia, U.S.
- Party: Democratic
- Spouse: Richard Shack
- Children: 3
- Education: Barry University (BA); University of Colorado (MA)

External videos
- Ruth Shack's Miami Story: a great champion for emerging leaders, The Miami Foundation.

Ruth Shack (née Ruth Naomi Burrows; August 24, 1931 – May 23, 2026) was an American politician who served as the sponsor of the 1977 Human Rights Ordinance in Miami-Dade County, Florida. She served on the Metro-Dade County Commission after being elected in 1976, 1978 and 1982. After leaving the commission, she became the President of the Dade Community Foundation (now The Miami Foundation). She retired in 2009.

== Early life and education ==
Ruth Naomi Burrows was born in Brooklyn on August 24, 1931, and grew up in Bay Shore, Long Island. She was a student at the University of Virginia Women's Division for two years before returning to New York to work with an advertising firm. She met Richard Shack on a blind date at the Allerton Hotel for Women in New York: after half an hour he said he was going to marry her. The couple married in 1953, drove to Miami Beach in a red convertible to spend their honeymoon, and never left.

Shack earned her Bachelor of Arts in humanities from Barry University in 1970 with a major in English and a minor in Journalism/Communications. In 1975, she received a Master of Arts in Social Science with specialization in Urban Sociology from the University of Colorado. She taught sociology and political science at Florida International University.

== Professional career ==
Shack was elected to three terms as a Metro-Dade County Commissioner, in 1976, in 1978, and in 1982, serving continuously from 1976 to 1986. As a commissioner, she stimulated the county and its municipalities to reassess historic resources such as the Art Deco District of South Beach. In 1981, she sponsored the first ordinance in the county for historic preservation.

=== Human Rights Ordinance ===
In December 1976 Shack, as a member of the Metro Dade County Commission, sponsored an amendment to the original Dade County anti-discrimination ordinance, to prohibit discrimination on the basis of sexual orientation in housing, jobs, and public accommodations. Shack's proposal was unanimously passed at its first reading.

==== Repeal of Ordinance ====
Later her former friend Anita Bryant led a highly publicized campaign to repeal the ordinance. Bryant claimed that it conflicted with "Christian beliefs regarding the sinfulness of homosexuality and the perceived threat of homosexual recruitment of children and child molestation". Discussion shifted from the ordinance's original focus, anti-discrimination in the workforce, to a highly emotional public debate around sexuality and lifestyle. On June 7, 1977, Miami-Dade voters voted 2 to 1 to repeal Shack's ordinance against discrimination. Shack described the result of the vote as being "three times worse than I ever expected", remarking further,

They came out of the woodwork. It was a huge step back nationally. We even lost heavily among Jewish liberals on Miami Beach. My political future? I'll be back to work again tomorrow. Life goes on.

==== Reinstatement of Ordinance ====
Passage of the ordinance continued to be debated. On December 1, 1998, the Dade County Commission re-enacted the anti-discrimination ordinance in a 7–6 vote, protecting individuals from discrimination on the basis of sexual orientation. On September 10, 2002, a ballot initiative to repeal the 1998 law was rejected by 56% of voters.

==== Impact of Ordinance ====
The passage and reinstatement of Shack's ordinance, and the community activism that it inspired, are considered to have been important steps towards the establishment of further anti-discrimination protections in Florida. A Florida statute forbidding adoptions by homosexuals was upheld in 2004 by a federal appellate court, but was struck down on November 25, 2008, by Judge Cindy Lederman. Lederman stated that the law violated the equal protection rights of children and prospective parents. She rejected the state's assertion of "a supposed dark cloud hovering over homes of homosexuals and their children", and stated that there was no rational basis for the prohibition of homosexual parents from adopting, particularly since the state allowed them to act as foster parents. The ruling cleared the way for the adoption of two brothers, ages 4 and 8, by the foster parents who had looked after them since December 2004, Martin Gill and his male partner.

=== Surrounded Islands ===
Shack and local attorney Joe Fleming were two of those who supported the Surrounded Islands installation by artists Christo and Jeanne-Claude in 1983. In this installation, eleven islands in Biscayne Bay were surrounded by hot pink fabric for 13 days. The project has been remembered in the short film Remembering Surrounded Islands by the Center for the Fine Arts. The project was credited with attracting global attention on Miami and the Art Deco District of South Beach as centers of the arts.

== Philanthropy ==
Shack served on the Council on Foundations as vice chair and as chair of its management committee. She also served on the boards of Funders Concerned About AIDS (FCAA) and the Coalition of Community Foundations for Youth. She was the founding chair of the Florida Philanthropic Network and the Alliance for Human Services and has also chaired the Communications Network. Shack was a member of the Transatlantic Community Foundation Network of the Bertelsmann Foundations.

=== The Miami Foundation ===
Shack served as the President of the Dade Community Foundation (later The Miami Foundation), from 1985 to 2009. Her stated goal for the Foundation was to "Create community. Bring people together." She worked to encourage philanthropy and charitable giving and established a permanent endowment with the purpose of addressing Greater Miami's charitable needs. Under her leadership, the foundation diversified and reached out to multicultural communities for its board and staff and in its grantmaking. Shack encouraged the grantmaking process to address issues of cultural alienation and help people to cross ethnic barriers through activities such as providing seed funding for small groups from diverse multicultural local communities.

In 1999 Shack established the Miami Fellows program of the Dade Community Foundation, to support the growth of community leadership in Miami. On January 27, 2009, Shack announced that she would step down from her post as president by the end of the year. After the Dade Community Foundation was renamed the Miami Foundation in 2010, it continued to support the Miami Fellows program.

The Miami Foundation has established the Ruth and Richard Shack Society, which includes its most generous supporters. Beginning in 2010, The Miami Foundation and the philanthropic program Leave a Legacy have presented the Ruth Shack Community Leadership Award each year to a Miami leader under 40.

== Archives and collections ==
Shack and her husband were early collectors of contemporary art in Miami, later donating much of their collection locally. In 2013, Shack donated a collection of archival materials and art books to the Otto G. Richter Library at the University of Miami.

In 2016, Ruth Shack was profiled by Ekaterina Juskowski for the Miami Girls Foundation as one of thirty influential Miami leaders shaping the city's cultural and civic landscape. Her portrait was later featured in the InsideOut Project, a global participatory art initiative. A photographic portrait of Shack is held by the Museum of Miami in an archival collection of photographs of recipients of Women of Impact awards. Ruth Shack also appears in the Miami Girls Foundation Manifesto video.

== Personal life and death ==
In 1953, Shack married Richard Shack (1926–2012). They had three daughters and seven grandchildren, and four great-grandchildren. She died in Cumming, Georgia, on May 23, 2026, at the age of 94.

== Awards ==
Shack was the recipient of the President's Award from the Cultural Executives Council (1981); Dade County's Outstanding Citizen's Award (1981–1982); delancyhill's inaugural Firm Partner Star (2005); Miami-Dade Chamber of Commerce Citizen of the Year (2009). In 2016, she received Miami's Cultural Champion Award, an event which was acknowledged by a declaration that February 9 was “Ruth Shack Day” in an official proclamation of the Miami Dade County Commission. In 2018, she received a Lifetime Leadership Award from the Miami Dade County Democratic Party.
