= Miami Girls Foundation =

American non-profit foundation

- Nickname: Miami Girls
- Founded: 2015
- Founder: Ekaterina Juskowski
- Type: NGO
- Tax ID no.: 82-5508585
- Location: Miami, Florida, U.S.
- Region served: United States
- Website: www.miamigirls.org

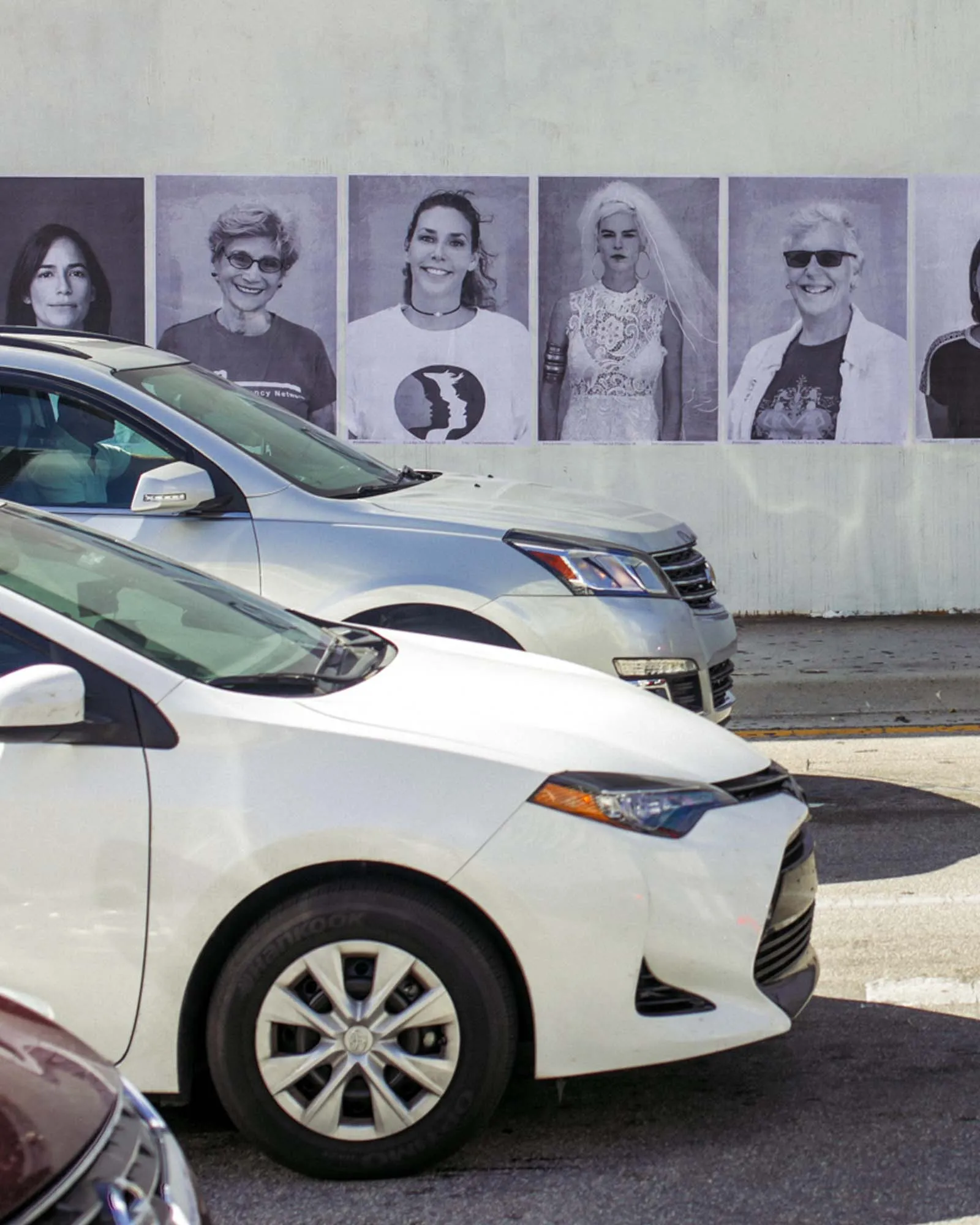
Inside Out project featuring Miami Leaders in Brickell neighborhood of Miami. March, 2017.

The Miami Girls Foundation, also known as Miami Girls, is an American non-profit organization based in Miami, Florida. The Miami Girls Foundation supports the efforts of feminist organizations and grassroot initiatives in South Florida.

== Overview ==
The Miami Girls Foundation was established in 2015 by Ekaterina Juskowski to challenge negative stereotypes of women from Miami. It received grants from the Knight Foundation and the Miami Foundation in support of its initiatives to promote female leaders in the city.

The inaugural "Miami Leaders" campaign by the Miami Girls Foundation launched in 2016 during Women's History Month and presented profiles of thirty Miami women in politics, art, civil rights, tech, and business. In a 2016 Univision interview, founder Ekaterina Juskowski stated: "My purpose is to introduce the world to many women who are working to improve the city and the image of the 'Miami girls'. Through their stories, we hope to inspire others to strive to build a better future and a better perception of Miami."

In 2017, Miami Girls followed with a second campaign called "Miami Girls Making History", profiling thirty female leaders of such organizations as the National Organization for Women (NOW), Planned Parenthood, SAVE, Women's Fund, and Women's March. The public awareness campaign during Women's History Month that year consisted of social media and media outreach and the Inside Out Project action in collaboration with the HistoryMiami Museum, where the portraits of Miami leaders were publicly displayed. Along with Julia Tuttle, the founder of Miami and the only female founder of a major American city, the Miami Girls presented close to a hundred leaders, including such names as Ruth Shack of the Miami Foundation, Patricia Ireland of NOW, Marleine Bastien of the Family Action Network Movement (FANM), Rebecca Fishman-Lipsey, and other social justice activists.

During 2018 and 2019, Miami Girls Foundation partnered with the Miami Workers Center with the goal to bring to public's attention the issues of feminization of poverty and the status of domestic workers in the United States, including unfair compensation, stolen wages, human and labor trafficking, modern slavery and other women's issues connected to domestic work. The "Never Not Working" awareness campaign presented the voices of women performing domestic work professionally, victims of labor trafficking, community leaders and political activists. To create the art performance, Miami Girls Foundation partnered with 100 political, social justice and non-profit organizations. Among the people who supported the "Never Not Working" initiative were politicians Daniela Levine Cava and Michael Gongora.

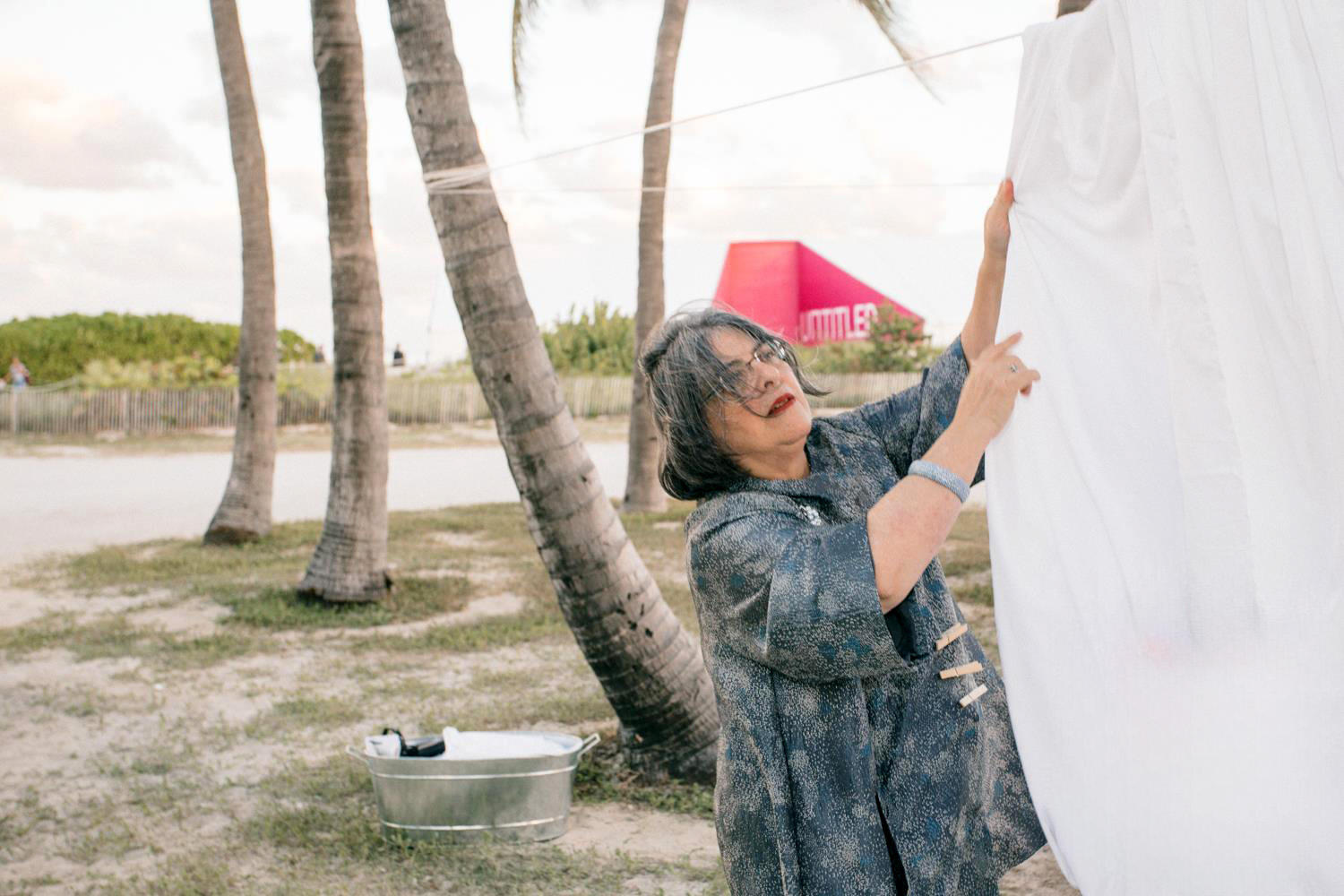
Miami Mayor Daniella Levine Cava took part in Never Not Working art installation during Art Basel Miami Beach in 2018. The art installation was part of a two-year campaign in support of National Domestic Workers Alliance.
