= JR (artist) =

French artist (born 1983)

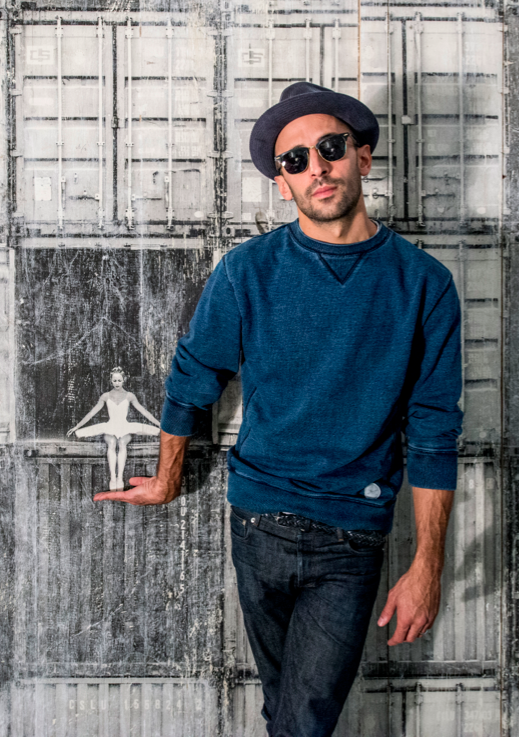
- JR at the Galerie Perrotin, 2015
- Born: 22 February 1983 (age 43); Paris, France
- Known for: Street art, photography, graffiti
- Notable work: Inside Out Project, Faces Places, "Women are Heroes", "Face 2 Face"
- Awards: TED Prize
- Website: www.jr-art.net

Jean-René (born 22 February 1983) known by his pseudonym, JR (French pronunciation: [ʒi ɛʁ]) is a French photographer and street artist who began his career on the streets of Paris. His moniker is derived from his first name, Jean-René. He is known for flyposting large black-and-white photographic images in public spaces. Referring to himself as a photograffeur—a portmanteau of "photographer" and the French word for graffiti artist—JR has described the street as "the largest art gallery in the world." His work often challenges widely held preconceptions and the reductive images propagated by advertising and the media."

JR's work typically explores themes such as identity, freedom, and social participation. He gained early recognition for pasting photographic portraits on buildings and urban structures in Paris, and later expanded his work internationally. He won the 2011 TED Prize, which he used to launch the global Inside Out Project, a participatory art initiative.

Time magazine included JR in its list of the 100 most influential people in 2018.

== Life and career ==
JR was born in Paris in 1983. His mother was originally from Tunisia.

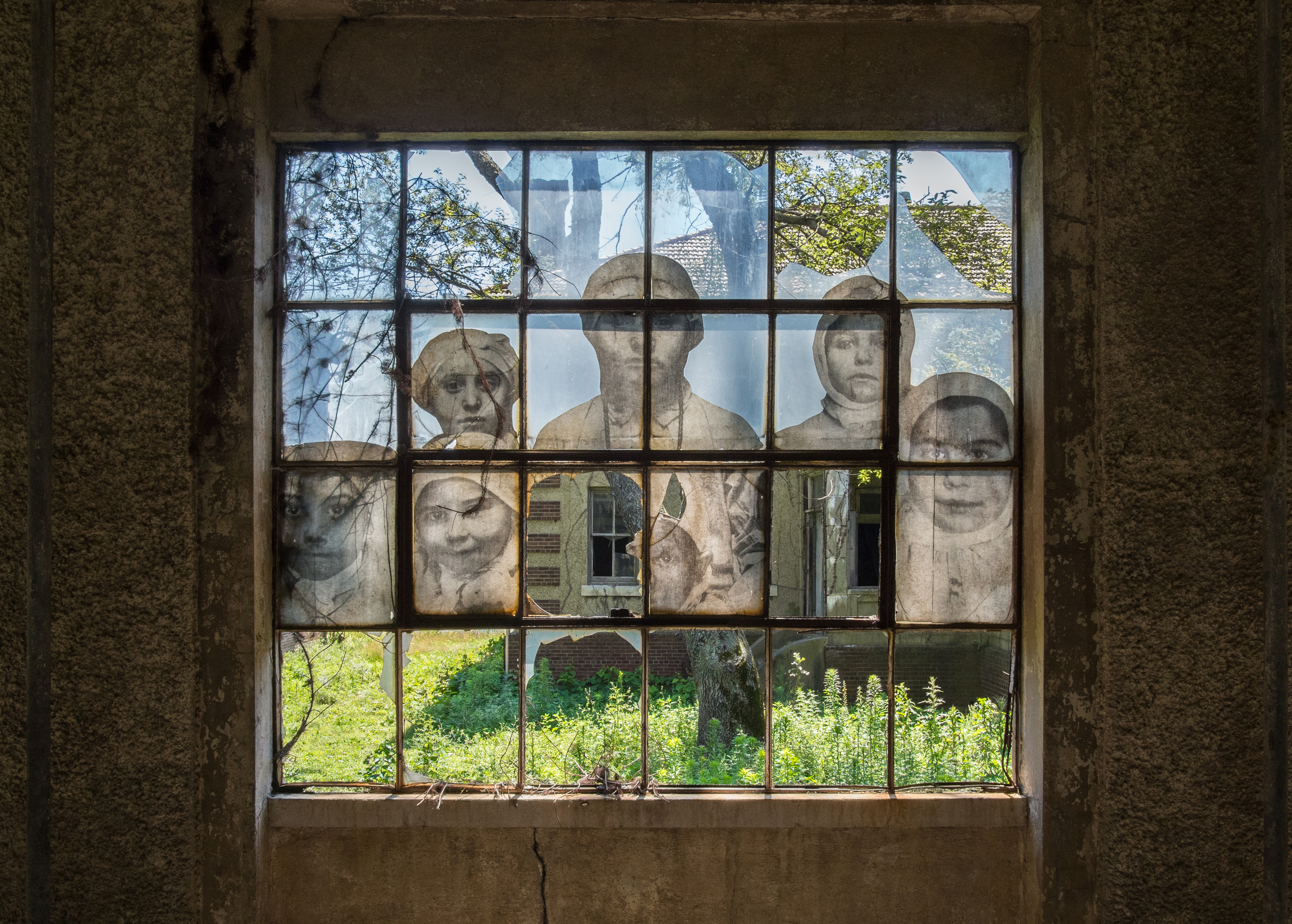
A mural from JR's "Unframed" installation at Ellis Island Hospital

JR began his career as a teenage graffiti artist who was by his own admission not interested in changing the world, but in making his mark on public space and society. His graffiti efforts often targeted precarious places like rooftops and subway trains, and he enjoyed the adventure of going to and painting in these spaces. After finding a camera in the Paris Metro, JR and his friends began to document the act of his graffiti painting. At the age of 17, he began applying photocopies of these photographs to outdoor walls, creating illegal "sidewalk gallery exhibitions".

JR later travelled throughout Europe to meet other people whose mode of artistic expression involved the use of outdoor walls. Then, he began wondering about the vertical limits, the walls and the façades that structure cities. After observing the people he met and listening to their message, JR pasted their portraits up in the streets and basements and on the roof tops of Paris.

Between 2004 and 2006, JR created Portraits of a Generation, portraits of young people from the housing projects around Paris that he exhibited in huge format. This illegal project became official when the City of Paris put JR's photos up on buildings. At the beginning of his projects, JR wanted to bring art into the street: "In the street, we reach people who never go to museums." In 2005, JR began pasting photographs of individuals from Les Bosquets on the walls of Paris to rectify the unbalanced coverage and representation of the people in the epicentre of the French riots that year.

In 2007, with Marco, JR put up enormous photos of Israelis and Palestinians face to face in eight Palestinian and Israeli cities on either side of the Separation Barrier. Upon his return to Paris, he pasted these portraits up in the capital. For the artist, this artistic act is first and foremost a human project:

"The heroes of the project are all those who, on both sides of the wall, allowed me to paste the portraits on their houses."

In 2008, JR undertook an international tour for Women Are Heroes, a project in which he highlights the dignity of women who are often targets during conflicts.

On 20 October 2010, JR won the TED Prize for 2011. He used the $100,000 award money to start the Inside Out Project, a global art initiative that has allowed thousands of people around the world to speak to their communities through portraits pasted in public space. This prize brought him and his work to New York City where he opened another studio, and inspired pastings in the area such as those done in 2011 of members of the Lakota Native American Tribe from North Dakota.

In 2013, he continued working in New York City, with the Inside Out Project in Times Square, which challenged advertising with a massive work of art consisting of thousands of portraits of locals and tourists.

In January 2014, JR collaborated with the New York City Ballet for their second annual Art Series program, by exhibiting work in the theatre in Lincoln Center, including an interactive piece on the floor of the promenade. This collaboration led JR to explore the artistic medium of choreography in another project with the ballet months later. In March 2014, JR created an installation with 4,000 faces in and on the Pantheon in Paris. In August 2014, JR was invited to make UNFRAMED in the abandoned hospital of Ellis Island, an important chapter in the history of immigration.

In 2015, he directed the short movie "ELLIS", starring Robert De Niro. The movie, set in the abandoned Ellis Island Hospital complex BBC JR's UNFRAMED art installation, tells the forgotten story of the immigrants who built America.

In 2016, JR was invited by the Louvre and made I. M. Pei's famous glass pyramid entrance disappear through a surprising anamorphosis. That year, he also worked on his Giants series in Rio de Janeiro during the 2016 Olympics, creating new gigantic sculptural installations at the scale of the city, depicting competing athletes in action, supported by scaffolding. His work putting an emphasis on the beauty of the athletic movement. His latest projects include a museum exhibition dedicated to children at Centre Pompidou, a permanent collaboration with the Brazilian artists Os Gemeos at Palais de Tokyo in Paris, in a space used to store stolen pianos during World War II, a gigantic installation at the US-Mexico border fence, and a film, Faces Places, co-directed with Agnès Varda, travelling around France to meet people and discuss their visions.

JR calls himself an "urban artivist", he creates pervasive art that he puts up on the buildings in the Paris area projects, on the walls of the Middle East, on the broken bridges of Africa or in the favelas of Brazil. During the pasting phase, community members take part in the artistic process. In Brazil, for example, children became artists for a week. In these artistic acts, no scene separates the actors from the spectators.

After having exhibited in the cities from which JR's subjects came, the photos traveled from New York to Berlin, Amsterdam to Paris As JR remains anonymous and does not frame his huge portraits, he leaves a space for an encounter between a subject/protagonist and a passerby/interpreter, and this is the essence of his work.

In 2018, JR partnered with Time magazine, to produce their cover story, featuring over two hundred Americans who have been impacted by guns, including "hunters and activists, teachers and police officers, parents and children", to produce "Guns in America"—a talking mural—on one of the most polarizing issues in the United States today. JR filmed the 245 contributors in three selected cities, Dallas, St. Louis, Missouri, and Washington, D.C. The November 5, 2018 Time cover is a collage of those individuals, whose profiles become a gateway to 245 unique stories.

In March 2019, JR again reimagined the Louvre pyramid in a 3D optical illusion. He used his iconic black and white stickers to make it appear as if the pyramid continued underground in an excavated crater. It was left in shreds within a day as visitors walked across it. JR embraced its short duration and even said that brevity had been his intent. He stated on Twitter: "The images, like life, are ephemeral. Once pasted, the art piece lives on its own. The sun dries the light glue and with every step, people tear pieces of the fragile paper. The process is all about participation of volunteers, visitors, and souvenir catchers."

JR is well known for his works with a humanistic approach that portray social realities. In November 2019, JR worked with a group of prisoners in a maximum-security prison in Tehachapi (California) and created a piece on the ground of a large courtyard of that institution. The great mural, photographed from a drone, shows the portraits of prisoners and former convicts who shared their stories. His intention was to give "a voice to inmates" and humanize their environment.

He is married to the artist Prune Nourry.

== Critical reception ==
In 2010, during a radio program in San Diego, California, artist Shepard Fairey stated: "JR is the most ambitious street artist working." Le Monde has described his work as "revealing humanity." With over a million Instagram followers, he's one of the most popular artists on social media.

In March 2014, in Les Inrockuptibles, Jean-Max Colard described his installation at the Panthéon as "demagogic". The same magazine also accuses him of "transforming the wild and rebellious practice of graffiti and postering into a legal, pompous and official art".

In April 2014, Fanny Erlandis for Slate judged that her Not A Bug Splat project was "Ultra-demago".

In the summer of 2015, his project with the evocative title AV and JR two artists on the go arouses incomprehension and harsh criticism. The project, led by recognized artists, appeals to the public generosity of a crowdfunding platform – a type of funding rather reserved for the launch of new artists. The media describe the project and its approach as candid and clumsy at best, condescending and demagogic at worst.

== Works ==
=== 28 Millimetres ===
JR considers himself as "neither a street artist nor a photographer". To carry out his projects, he uses photography but also video, prints on paper or tarpaulins, urban spaces, books and especially social links. JR noted "I would like to bring art to improbable places, create projects so huge with the community that they are forced to ask themselves questions. I want to try to create images of hot spots such as the Middle East or Brazil that offer different points of view from the ones we see in the worldwide media which are often caricatures."

=== Portraits of a Generation ===
The Portraits of a Generation project constitutes the first stage of the 28 mm project. After the first unauthorized exhibit on the walls of the Cité des Bosquets housing project in Paris, JR returned and set himself up of this housing project and the neighbouring one, the Cité de la Forestière, both in the epicenter of the 2005 riots in the French suburbs. The first portraits were rapidly exhibited on the walls of the last popular neighbourhoods of the capital, in the east of Paris. These photos provoked the passerby in as much as they questioned the social and media representation of a whole generation that for some is only to be seen relegated to the outskirts of the capital.

=== Face 2 Face ===
The Face 2 Face project tried to show that beyond what separates them, Israelis and Palestinians are enough alike to be able to understand one another. Israeli and Palestinian men and women who have the same jobs accepted to laugh or cry, to scream or pull faces in front of JR's lens. The portraits created were pasted up face to face, in monumental format on either side of the Separation Wall and in several surrounding towns. JR photographed and Marco wrote, together succeeding in creating the largest unauthorized urban art exhibit in the world (la plus grande exposition d'art urbain au monde). The project's goal was to show through images that art and laughter combined can break down prejudice.

The film Faces, directed by Gerard Maximin, about this artistic undertaking carried out in the Middle East by JR and Marco has won numerous prizes.

=== Women are Heroes ===
For this project, JR slipped into fantasmatic places, the ones seen on TV when there is violence, the ones an observer might go close to but never enter and that will not be found on any tourist guidebook tour. Women are Heroes introduces women who sometimes look death in the face, who go from laughter to tears, who are generous, have nothing and yet share, who have had a painful past and long to build a happy future. In seeking what is common in their gaze, JR tried to get closer to what is universal: the human being. This project allowed him to keep the promise he made to these women: faire voyager leur histoire (to make their story travel). Women are Heroes has traveled to locations including Sierra Leone, Liberia, Kenya, Brazil, India, and Cambodia. In 2014, JR made one final project for Women Are Heroes with the dockers of Le Havre, France. Imaging a woman's eyes from the previous trip in Kenya, JR and his team completed the largest pasting to date on shipping containers that were then stacked on a container ship traveling from Le Havre to Malaysia. In doing so, he finally took the women's stories around the globe.

=== Wrinkles of the City ===
The Los Surcos de la Ciudad project (The Wrinkles of the City) is based on the encounter between JR, the city of Cartagena, Spain, and its oldest inhabitants who are taken as the memory incarnate of the Murcian city, marked by the scars of its history, economic expansion and socio-cultural mutations. While meeting and photographing the elderly, JR imaged their wrinkles, the furrows of their brows, as the marks of time, the traces of their lives that are linked with the history of the city.

JR described these older people as the living memory of the city, which is changing faster than they themselves age. He linked their wrinkles to the buildings and streets of old Cartagena.

As of 2015, The Wrinkles of the City project has reached Cartagena, Spain; Shanghai, China; Los Angeles, California; Havana, Cuba; Berlin, Germany, and Istanbul, Turkey.

In 2012, JR collaborated on the Cuban iteration of the project with José Parlá, a Brooklyn-based artist of Cuban descent, for the Havana Biennale. The artists installed huge murals of photographs of senior citizens who had lived through the revolution, enhanced with Parlá's calligraphic writings and painted lines.

=== Inside Out Project ===
The Inside Out Project is a large-scale participatory art project that transforms messages of personal identity into pieces of artistic work in the form of black and white photographic portraits. The images are uploaded digitally and made into posters and sent back to the project's co-creators for them to exhibit in their own communities. Over 150,000 people from more than 108 countries have participated.

In 2013, the project created a massive exhibit in Times Square in Manhattan that challenged advertising with art created from thousands of portraits of locals and tourists. The effort to engage New Yorkers across the five boroughs after Hurricane Sandy, was completed using one of the Inside Out Project Photobooth trucks. This method created by JR produced a more direct connection of his work to the streets through an immediate interaction with the community and the people. The Photobooth trucks have since traveled around the world for a variety of different causes, including a nationwide tour that brought attention to immigration reform in America, and a 10-stop trip to major monuments in France ending with a large installation in the Pantheon in Paris.

=== Unframed ===
Unframed is an ongoing project that began in 2010, realized using images by famous or anonymous photographers, and archival images that JR interpreted and took out of their context depending on the place, neighborhood, or city he worked in. In works such as those made in May 2013 in Marseille, France, JR dug into the identity of the neighborhood of la Belle de Mai, and invited its inhabitants to think about the memory of their streets by looking into their personal photo albums. The photographs, old or new, cropped or enlarged, create monumental artworks on the facades of neighborhoods and transform personal and multiple footprints of what is part of the city's history and collective memory. JR has exhibited Unframed works in Cincinnati, Marseille, Atlanta, Washington DC, Baden Baden, Grottaglie, Vevey, and São Paulo.

In 2014, JR continued his Unframed project on Ellis Island, using photos from when the island operated as the entryway for millions of immigrants to America. These archival images were installed into the facades and walls of the abandoned hospital on the grounds that once housed the sick and dying.

=== NYCBallet ===
In 2014, JR collaborated with the New York City Ballet for their second annual Art Series program. JR exhibited artworks in the Lincoln Center David H. Koch theatre in January and February, including a large installation of an interactive piece on the floor of the promenade. This work followed his model of engaging with his fans and the public across social divides, connecting ballet patrons to first time attendees with the image of the life-size ballerinas on the ground.

The Art Series led to further collaborations between the artist and the New York City Ballet, as months later he explored a new artistic medium of choreography. JR worked with the company's ballet master in chief Peter Martins to create a piece titled Les Bosquets based on his beginnings during the 2005 riots in the Parisian suburbs. For this project, the dancers became his paper and his works were transformed to the stage.

=== U.S.–Mexico border art ===
In September 2017, JR erected a scaffolding with a large photograph of a little boy, on the Mexican side of the U.S.–Mexico border, giving the impression of the toddler curiously peering over the fence, when seen from the U.S. side. The boy, named Kikito, lives with his family close to the border in Tecate, where the piece of art was erected. On the last day of the installation, a border crossing picnic was arranged, with hundreds of participants. Food was passed through the fence, and was eaten off a surface with a photograph, picturing the eyes of a young undocumented U.S. immigrant (sometimes known as "Dreamers"). The left eye was on a table on the Mexico side; the right eye was on a tarp on the U.S. side, together creating the impression of a single long dining table when viewed from above. (Aerial photograph.) JR expected the picnic to be shut down, but it was tolerated, with one of the U.S. border agents sharing a cup of tea with the artist.

=== Greetings from Giza ===
In October 2021, JR participated in the festival Forever is Now, which brings contemporary art to antique sites. He decided to intervene on the Pyramid of Khafre and created the trompe-l'oeil Greetings from Giza, made of mesh and a steel structure. Using an anamorphosis technique, the top of the pyramid appeared to float in mid-air. At the same time, JR released his first NFT collection, composed of 4,591 pieces of the work's image.

=== The resilience of Ukraine ===
After the 2022 invasion of Ukraine, he inaugurated The Resilience of Ukraine, in Lviv.

=== L'Observatoire carriage of Venice-Simplon-Orient-Express ===
In 2023 JR has designed the interior of the new private carriage L'Observatoire of the Venice Simplon-Orient-Express. It was made from the 1929 built Lx class sleeping car No. 3353, now containing a bedroom for two, a lounge, a library, a tea chamber and a bathroom with bathtub. The vehicle was exhibited in April 2024 at the Venice Biennale to provide first impressions, and it's running in passenger service since 2025.

=== La Caverne du Pont Neuf ===
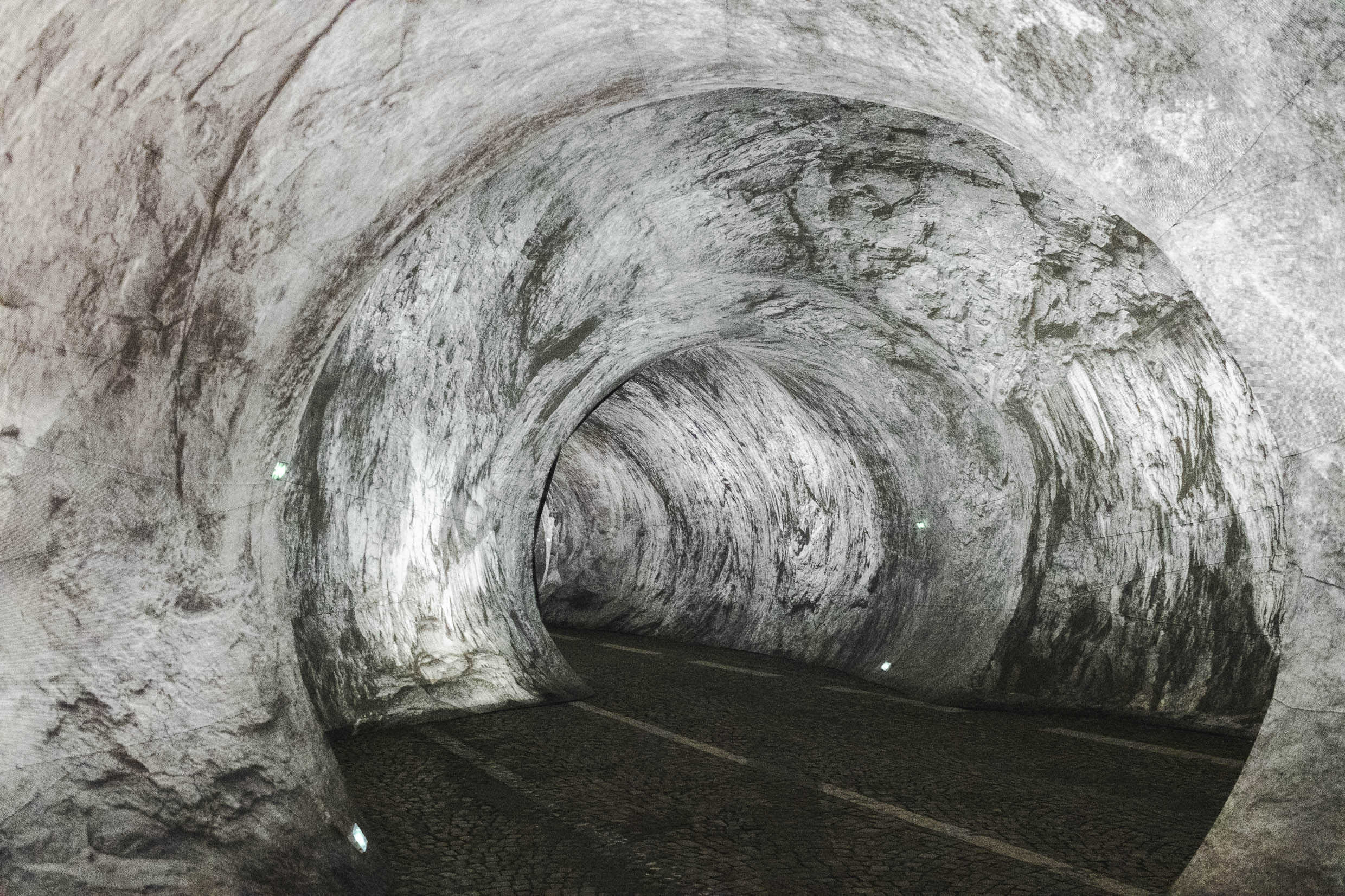
An interior view of JR's artwork, La Caverne du Pont Neuf

In May 2026, JR began assembling La Caverne du Pont Neuf, a monumental temporary installation transforming the Pont Neuf into a walkable trompe-l'œil grotto inspired by the Lutetian limestone quarries that originally supplied the bridge's stone. On view from 6 to 28 June 2026, the work pays tribute to Christo and Jeanne-Claude's The Pont Neuf Wrapped (1985) on its 40th anniversary, and was developed in coordination with the Christo and Jeanne-Claude Foundation. The original opening date of 6 June was postponed to 15 June due to the installation being damaged by wind caused by hail storms.

== Feature films ==
JR transferred his Women Are Heroes project to the cinema in directing a feature film made up of images of the pasting phase of the installations and interviews of the women. Through this documentary film, the artist shows us how he installed the portraits of the women in urban spaces and the reactions of the inhabitants. He explains "this film gathers the images and the words of the women he met, the day to day flow of their lives and experiences to create, through art, a reality different from the one shown in the media".

This first film was selected as a special screening in the Critics' Week section at the 2010 Cannes Film Festival, where it competed for the Caméra d'Or. In May 2010, JR was invited to present his film on Le Grand Journal on Canal+ in Cannes during the festival.

JR's second film, Inside Out: The People's Art Project, is a documentary that tracks the evolution of the biggest participatory art project in the world, Inside Out. JR inspired communities to define their most important causes with displays of giant black and white portraits pasted in the street. The project encourages citizens to take ownership of walls that were previously restricted and in doing so testing the limits of what they thought was possible. It is a Social Animals production in association with Notting Hill Films, directed by Alastair Siddons.

This film was featured as an official Documentary Feature Spotlight selection at the 2013 Tribeca Film Festival, premiered at the SVA Theatre on West 23rd Street, on Saturday, April 20 and debuted on HBO in May 2013.

In 2015, JR made the movie Les Bosquets inspired by the riots in the French suburbs in 2005 and featuring the performance of the ballet Les Bosquets of New York City Ballet (2014). The same year, he directed the short film titled Ellis, starring Robert De Niro.

In 2017, JR's collaboration with filmmaker Agnès Varda, Faces Places, was released. It won the "Golden Eye" for best documentary film at the 2017 Cannes Film Festival and was nominated for Best Documentary Feature at the 90th Academy Awards amongst other awards listed later on this page.

JR's film Paper & Glue was released in 2021. It was nominated for two News & Documentary Emmy Awards.

In 2024, JR co-directed with Alice Rohrwacher the short film An Urban Allegory, which made its world premiere out of competition at the 81st Venice International Film Festival.

== Exhibitions ==
2009

- Paris, France, Ile Saint-Louis – Pavillon de l'Arsenal, Mairie du 4e arr.

2010

- Shanghai, China – Magda Danysz Gallery – The Wrinkles of the City

2013

- Cincinnati, OH – Contemporary Arts Center

2014

- Baden Baden, Germany – Museum Frieder Burda.

2015

- Boston, MA – translucent pasting on glass of the John Hancock Tower, spanning from the 44th to the 50th floors
- London – Lazarides

2016

- Paris – Louvre. From 25 May to 27 June, JR transformed the Louvre Pyramid using one of his anamorphic images. When seen from the right angle, the Pyramid seemed to disappear.

2023

- Paris – Titled Retour à la caverne at Place de l'Opera. Act 1 occurred in September involved an art display that made the opera appear to be a large cave. Act 2 occurred in November and was called Chiroptera. It involved over 150 dancers choreographed by Damien Jalet dancing on a similar cavernous scaffolding to original music by Thomas Bangalter. The performance occurred twice on the evening of 12 November.

== Awards ==
On 20 October 2010, JR won the TED Prize for 2011.

In 2017, his documentary with Agnès Varda, entitled Faces, Places was nominated for and won several awards and accolades, including the following:

- Won the L'Œil d'or, le prix du documentaire / The Golden Eye, the Documentary Prize at the 2017 Cannes Film Festival
- Won the Grolsch People's Choice Documentary Award at the 2017 Toronto International Film Festival
- Won the Most Popular International Documentary Award at the 2017 Vancouver International Film Festival
- Won Best Documentary at the 2018 Independent Spirit Awards
- Received the award for Best Non-Fiction Film by the New York Film Critics Circle
- Time Magazine listed it as one of its top ten films of 2017
- Nominated for Best Documentary Feature Film at the 90th Academy Awards
- Nominated for Best Documentary and Best Original Score at the 2018 César Awards

In 2021, his latest film, entitled Paper & Glue, was nominated for two News & Documentary Emmy Awards.

== See also ==
- The Standing March (2015)
