= The Standing March =

- Artist: JR; Darren Aronofsky
- Year: 2015
- Location: Paris, France

The Standing March is a collaborative art installation by the French artist JR and the American filmmaker Darren Aronofsky. The artwork, which depicts more than 500 people, was projected onto the facade of the National Assembly building during the 2015 United Nations Climate Change Conference in Paris.

== See also ==
- 2015 in art
