= Inside Out Project =

Global participatory art project

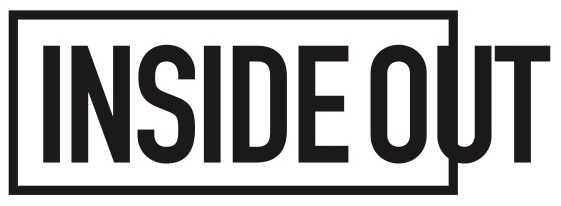

Inside Out is a global participatory art project initiated by the French photographer JR.

After winning the TED prize in 2011, JR expressed his wish to "change the world" by turning it "inside out". With the $100,000 from the TED Prize, JR set about achieving this by giving the power of representation back to the people.

The project, inspired by JR's large-format street pastings, is open to anyone, anywhere in the world. The central concept places emphasis on people and their stories as well as the statement behind each Group Action. Apart from the printing of portraits, participants have full control of both the creative process (taking their pictures) and the pasting process (the installation of the posters). By using strictly black-and-white portraits, which are printed and then pasted in a public, exterior space, each Group Action can make a statement in the form of a public artwork and share its message with the rest of the world.

Every Inside Out Group Action is documented, archived, and exhibited on the project's website. As of August 2022, over 2,300 Group Actions have taken place, with nearly 500,000 posters printed and shipped to 148 countries. The Inside Out Project has reached all 7 continents, including Antarctica. The Inside Out Project has traveled from Ecuador to Nepal, from Mexico to Palestine, inspiring Group Actions on varied themes such as hope, diversity, violence awareness, and climate change.

== Notable projects ==
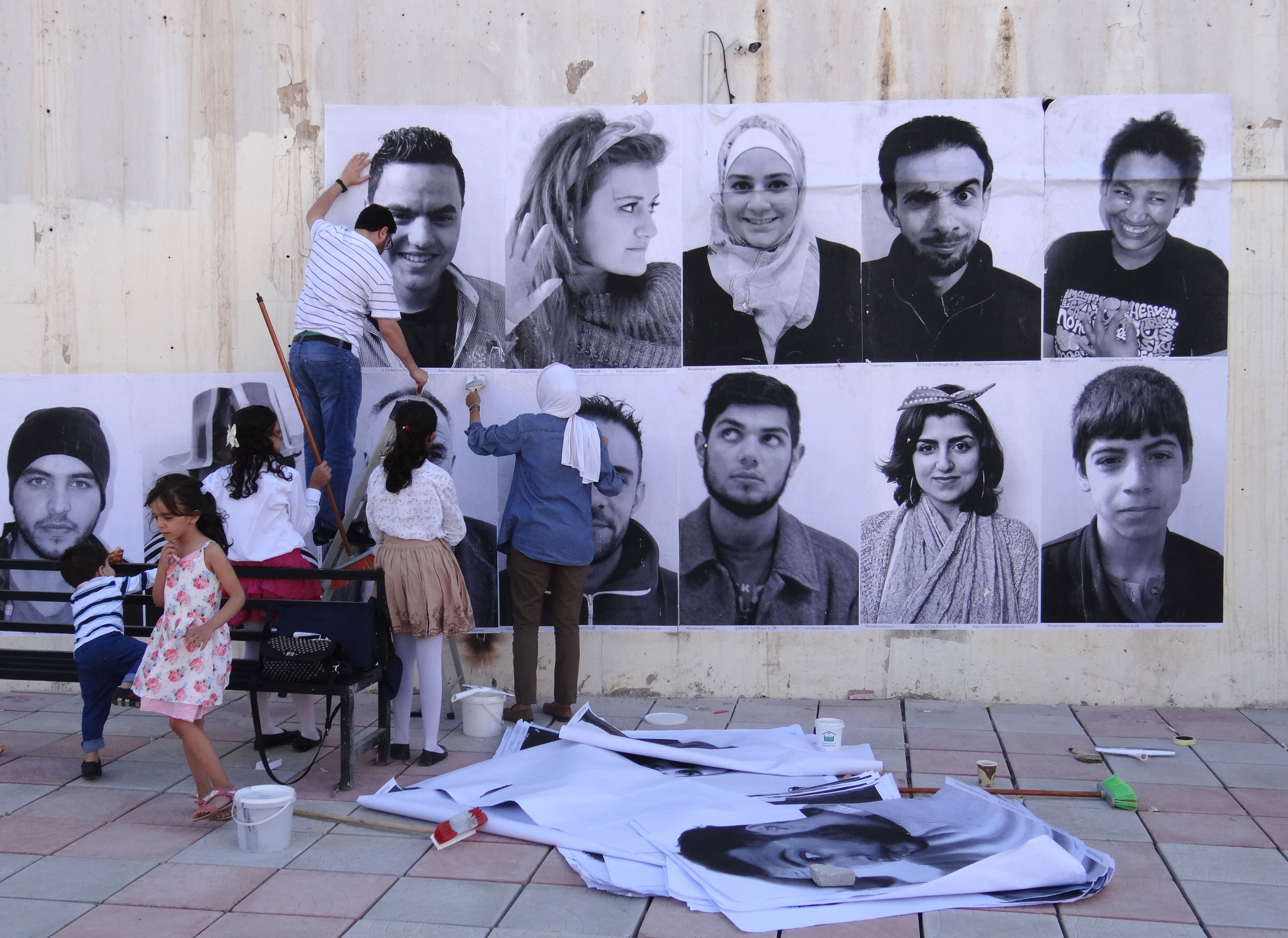
Irbid, Jordan, "We are Arabs. We are Humans"

Many individuals have become ardently involved in the Inside Out Project. According to Raffi Khatchadourian of The New Yorker, "A participant in Iran, at grave personal risk, had posted an image of a defiant-looking woman beneath a state sponsored billboard" and "Russian gay rights activists protested with the images and were briefly imprisoned in Moscow."

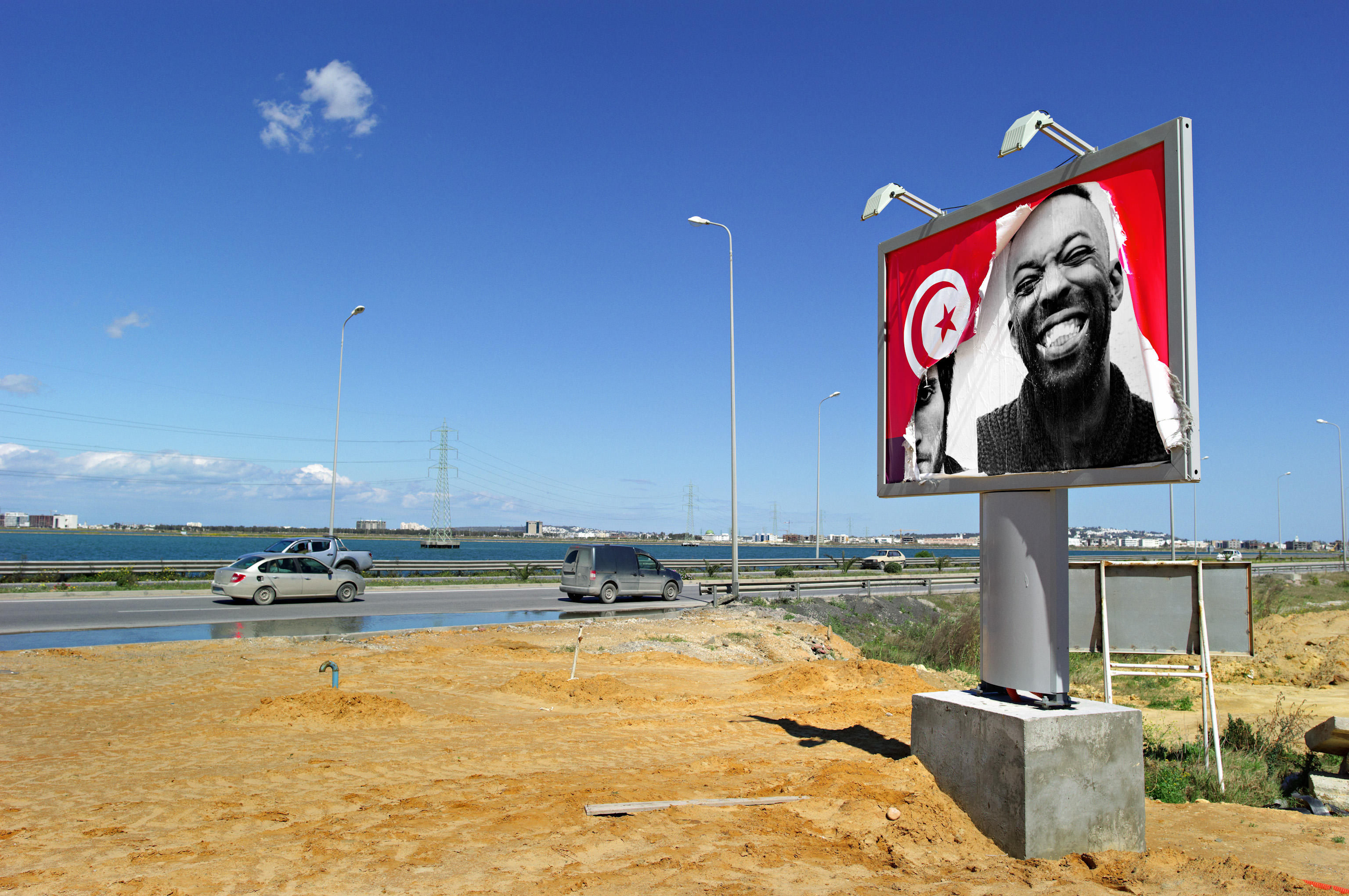
"Inside Out Tunisia" Tunis, Tunisia.

Inside Out led to heated results in Tunisia, where installations began just as dictator Zine el-Abidine Ben Ali stepped down. Participants pasted photos over posters of Ben Ali on an old fort.

After the Inside Out Action in Tunisia, the project became world renowned. Since March 2011, many notable Actions have taken place:

- In Ciudad Juarez, Mexico, 1180 portraits lined the walls of the Mexican–American border to show the underrepresented faces of a city known for crime (2011).
- In Caracas, Venezuela, 312 portraits showing mothers who have lost a child because of violence were pasted in the city (2011).
- In Georgetown, Guyana, 601 portraits were put up showing the eyes of Guyanese children who have witnessed acts of violence against their mothers, their sisters, or themselves (2012).
- In Haiti, 389 portraits were printed in an effort to show the country through the eyes of locals. The project, called Rising Souls, aimed at conveying a sense of hope, pride and resilience (2012).
- Some Lakota members of the Standing Rock Indian Reservation, North Dakota also became involved with Inside Out by pasting their portraits within the walls of their communities. JR then also pasted these portraits in New York City. "I've just basically made an encore of their work in the city." he said in an interview. He calls the New York pastings, "a small window into the project."
- A Group Action called "Save the Arctic" launched an expedition to the North Pole. The group's purpose was to protect the inhabitants of the area as well as its endangered wild life. Over 2000 portraits were used to make up a giant eye that was printed into a flag. It was placed on the arctic ice in defiance against aggressive industries developing in the North Pole (April 2013).
- "The Faces and the Stories on the Frontlines" was created in Mangochi, Malawi. The aim of this Group Action was to highlight the obstacles Malawians are faced with in the fishing and food-processing industries (May 2013).
- In December 2013, it was time for Lyon, France, to be turned Inside Out. In honor of the 30th anniversary of the Walk for equality and against racism, 5000 participants sent their portraits, 2000 of which were pasted Rue de la République in less than 10 hours.
- In April 2014, an extremely powerful Group Action was created in Pakistan. The purpose of this Action was to confront American drone operators that refer to those that are killed by the drones as "bug splats." They wanted to put a face to the innocents that are killed by drones, and remind those flying above who they are affecting. As they state, "Now, when viewed by a drone camera, what an operator sees on his screen is not an anonymous dot on the landscape, but an innocent child victim's face." They plan to use the material afterwards as roofing for nearby villages.
- In December 2014, the Millions March NYC took place in response to the grand jury decisions in New York and Ferguson regarding the deaths of Eric Garner and Michael Brown. The protesters held up the eyes of Eric Garner that had been printed and pasted on large billboards.
- In January 2015, after the terrorist attacks in France, the Inside Out Project Team prepared a tribute for the victims of Charlie Hebdo. The eyes of the newspaper's writers and illustrators were printed and pasted onto large billboards held up by the participants to the march in New York and Paris.
- In Miami over 100 portraits were displayed throughout the city in an effort to reshape the hyper sexualized image of Miami women. The project led by the feminist organization Miami Girls Foundation featured female Miami leaders shaping the future of the city.

== Photobooths ==
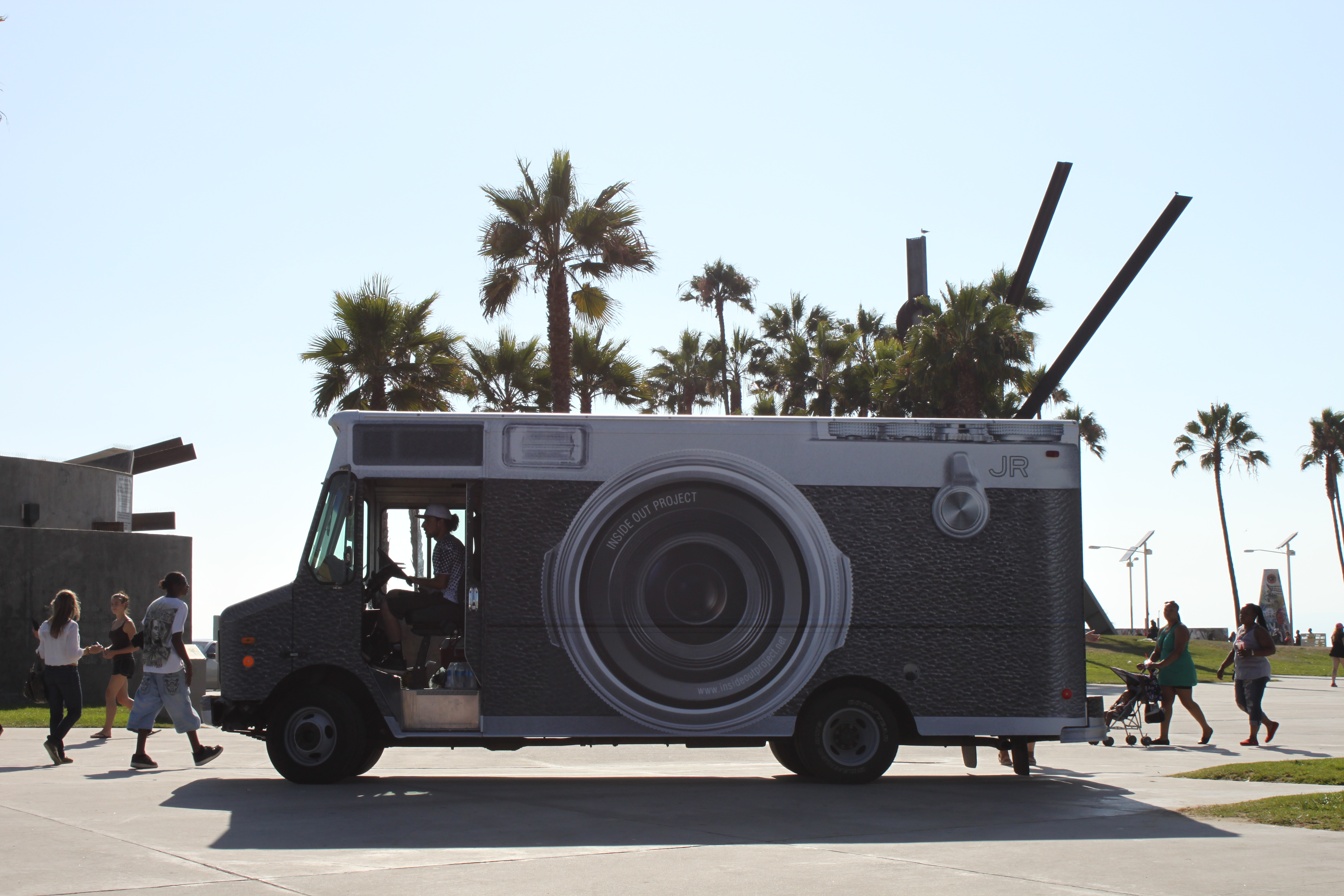
Photobooth Truck, LA, California, US

Starting in 2011, JR set up large Photobooths in different locations — two in Paris, France, one in Arles, France and one in Abu Dhabi in order to get more people involved in the project. These Photobooths allow participants in Inside Out to immediately receive their portraits after having their picture taken, becoming active models in the project. Without having to submit a Group Action on the website, participants are invited to paste their picture wherever it makes sense for them.

Following these installations, mobile Photobooth trucks were constructed for cross-country tours. Each truck features a built-in Photobooth and printer, making the Inside Out process more immediate. This way, Inside Out managed to show the world faces from the villages and cities they visited – faces that would have otherwise never have been exposed.

A List of Notable Inside Out Photobooths since 2011:

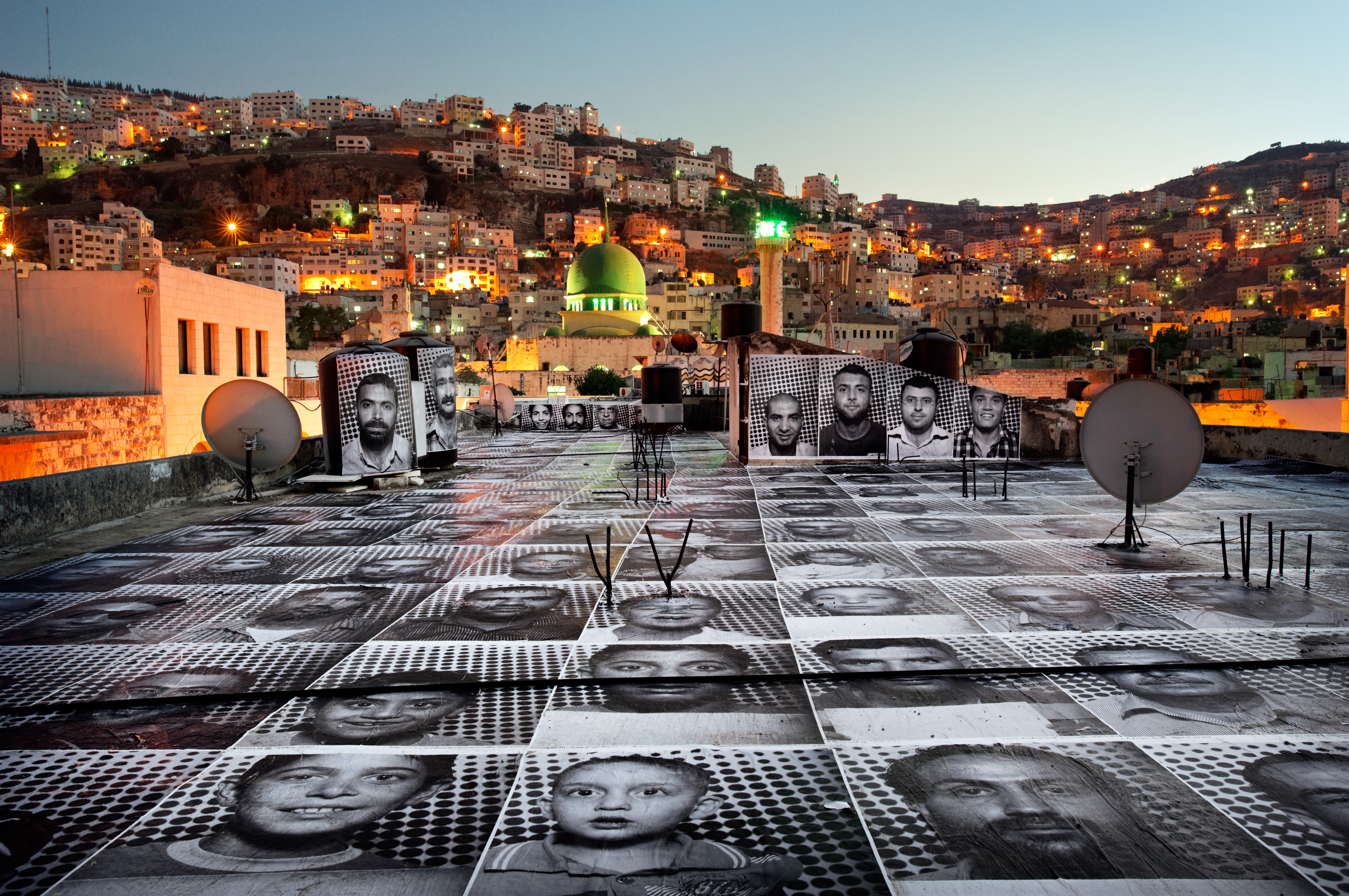
"Time is Now, Yalla!", Israel/Palestine

- "Time is Now, Yalla!", Israel and Palestine, September 2011. 3275 portraits of Israelis and Palestinians were collected.
- "Perrotin Gallery, Paris". The Photobooth was installed at the Perrotin Gallery in Paris between November and January 2012 as a part of JR's exhibit entitled "Encrages". 6168 portraits were collected.
- "Perrotin Gallery, Hong Kong". A second Photobooth was installed in the gallery this time in Hong Kong, between September and November 2012. 3 933 portraits were taken.
- "Images Festival, Vevey". This Photobooth was installed for the festival in Vevey, Switzerland in September 2012. 4 773 portraits were collected.
- "North of Japan & Tokyo". In autumn of 2012, a Photobooth traveled through Japan from Tokyo to Fukushima collecting 24 067 portraits along the way.
- In September 2013, 1239 portraits were taken at the Contemporary Arts Center in Cincinnati, Ohio.
- At the "Unseen Photo Fair" in Amsterdam, 1 748 portraits were also taken.
- In October 2013, a Photobooth truck set in London allowed 1 851 people to strike a pose.
- In November 2013, a Photobooth truck was set in Paris to celebrate the new documentary "Inside Out: The People's Art Project", collecting 2 130 portraits.
- In Shreveport, Louisiana, a Photobooth truck collected 533 portraits.
- From January to March 2014, a Photobooth was installed in the Contemporary museum of Dallas, in Dallas, Texas. 2957 people had their picture taken.
- From March to June 2014, a Photobooth was set up at the Frieder Burda museum in Baden Baden, Germany collecting 23 669 portraits.
- A Photobooth truck in Shanghai collected 23 669 portraits.
- In Wuppertal, Germany, 700 people took their portrait to take a stance in the Group Action "Different faces, different views" in October 2014.
- As a part of the Hong Kong Contemporary Art Foundation, a Photobooth truck was set up from March to April 2015. 3610 portraits were collected.
- The Inside Out Action Chambéry, in France in June 2015 gave the opportunity to participants to see their portraits be immediately pasted onto the ground around the courthouse, forming a gigantic eye.
- Recently, one of the trucks traveled to the "Ideas" festival in Aspen, Colorado in June 2015. 575 portraits were collected.
- A Photobooth truck was in Boston's Back Bay Station and Dudley Square (Roxbury, MA) where 648 portraits were collected from both sites.
- In Rio de Janeiro in 2016, for the first time in the history of the Olympic Games, the IOC invited an artist to give his interpretation of the Games, both as a sporting occasion and as a source of inspiration. The Photobooth truck took 7,478 portraits.
- In 2018, the Photobooth traveled across the United States for Inside Out Vote, with 6,185 portraits, which was to awaken a sense of empowerment and provide voter registration groups a unique platform to register, energize and empower voters in communities throughout the U.S.
- Vitry, in 2019, highlighted the progress of work on the Grand Paris Express metro, displaying 464 portraits on the former Arrighi wastelands.
- NY Together was pasted at Port Authority in 2021 as a family portrait of the city celebrating the strength of their diversity, in part to welcome New Yorkers back to the city. The weeklong Photobooth activation had to be cut short because of the massive turnout—the wall was entirely filled.
- IOP Kobe, in 2022, pasted over 2,500 portraits in the waterfront area with the aim of communicating to the world the allure of Kobe, a vibrant port city about to be transformed through redevelopment.

The trucks and the Inside Out Project team traveled across the United States and France to organize various Photobooth Actions.

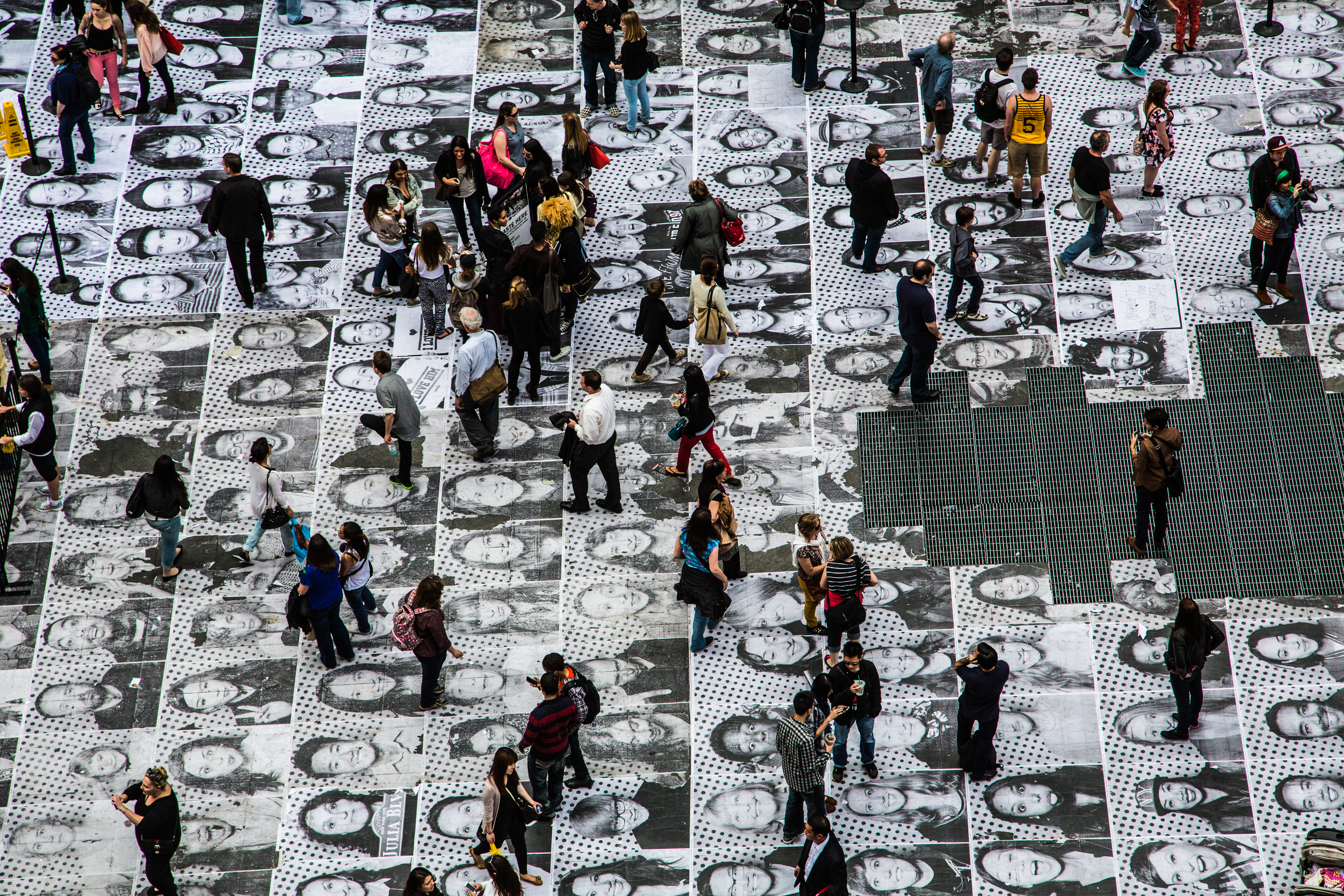
"Inside Out NYC", Times Square, NYC

InsideOut NYC - Times Square

One of Inside Out's largest Actions to date took place in New York City. From April to May 2013, the team built a photo-booth truck that traveled first to the outer boroughs of the city and finally to Times Square for the final installation. The Action was an effort to portray a collective view of New Yorkers after Hurricane Sandy, and challenge the advertising of the busiest place in the nation with art. The posters were pasted in the communities of the outer boroughs, in Times Square itself, and citywide. Nearly 6,000 posters were printed.

Inside Out 11M
Another Photobooth Action was Inside Out 11M, a nationwide initiative aimed at creating a portrait of America that spoke for the 11 million undocumented immigrants inhabiting the United States. Inside Out 11M aimed to represent the diversity and unity of people that call America home, reminding us that behind the numbers are real human stories. From 16 July to 8 October 2013, both the East and West coast trucks visited 20 different cities across the country.

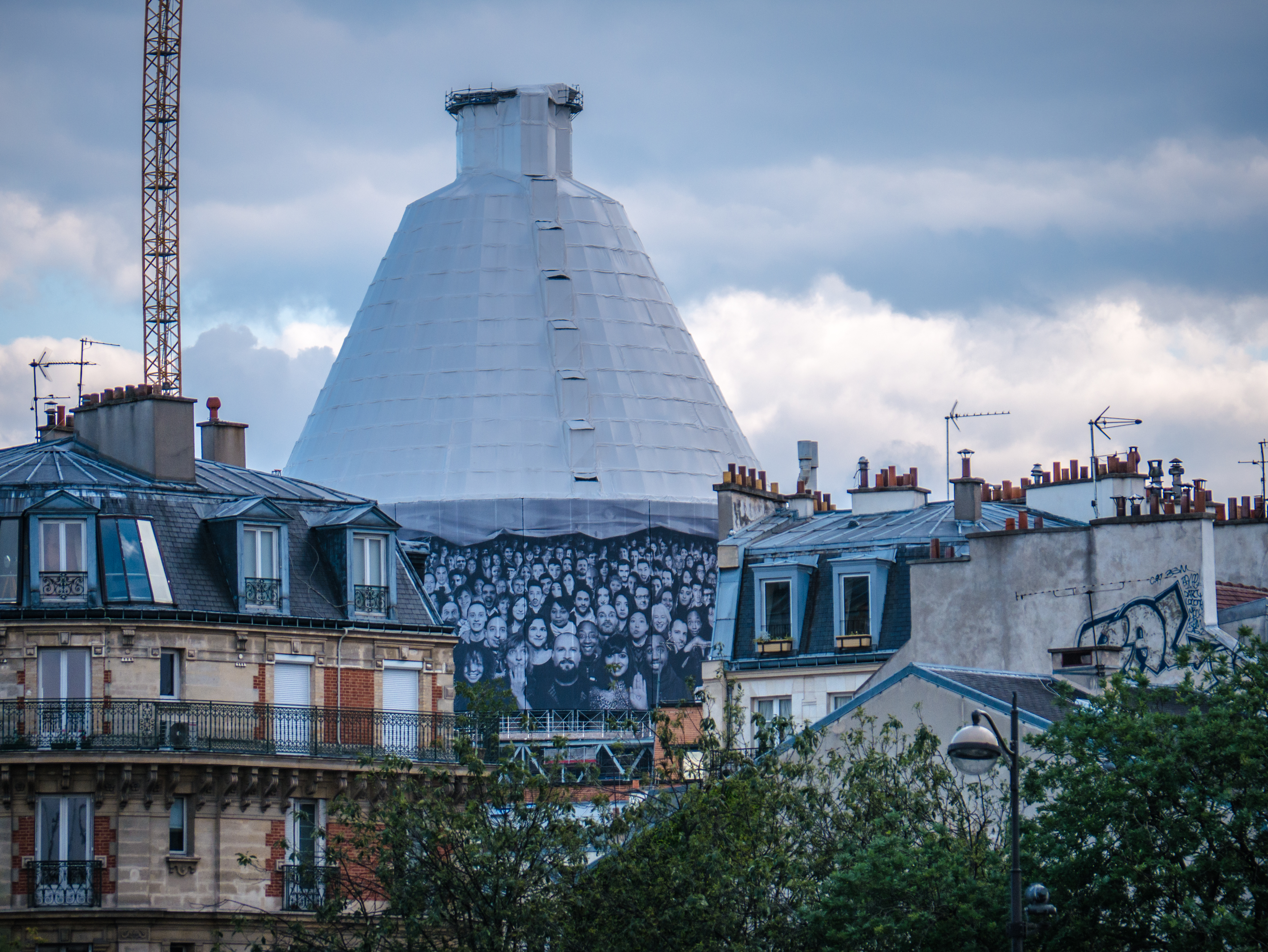
"Au Panthéon!", Paris, France

Au Panthéon!
In France, the Center of National Monuments collaborated with the Inside Out Project for a special, patriotic installation that would wrap around the Panthéon, Paris. The idea of this nationwide Action was to encapsulate the humanistic and universal values embodied by the historical monument.

Throughout the month of March 2014, self-portraits were collected for the installation via the project's website, where everyone around the world was welcome to participate and submit their photos.

Additionally, to gather more portraits for the project, from 5 to 29 March 2014, the Photobooth truck visited the following sites:

The Basilica of Saint-Denis, Château and ramparts of the City of Carcassonne, the Château d'Angers, the Carnac Stones, the Towers of La Rochelle, the Palais du Tau in Reims, the Villa Savoye in Poissy, the Hôtel de Sully in Paris, and finally the Pantheon. The portraits that best represent the diversity of the contemporary world were used to create a mosaic that wrapped around the monument. The goal was to utilize all of the portraits collected in the final work, which was inaugurated on 22 April 2014.

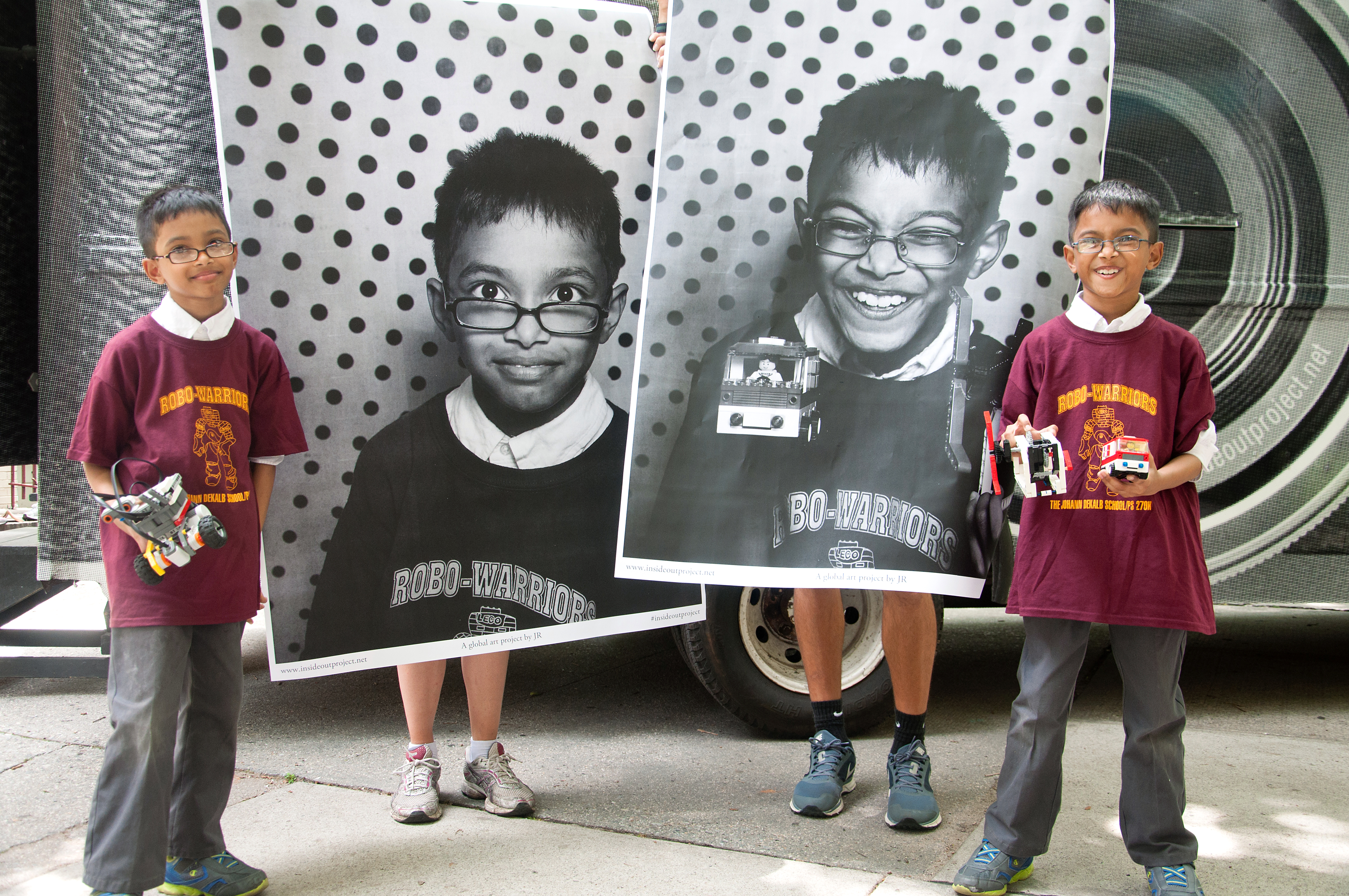
Back2School Brooklyn

Back2School

Since May 2014, the Inside Out Team has launched the project "Back2School". The Inside Out team regularly visits New York City public schools to take pictures with the Photobooth trucks at no cost. The portraits are then immediately printed and pasted onto the walls of the school. By showing the faces of the students, Inside Out wishes to give them the opportunity to show their personality through their photo and to express themselves outside of school.

Inside Out Education also focuses on Group Actions within educational settings; the project has naturally transferred into the teaching environment as it allows educators and students to present subject matters in a playful and engaging way. The Project includes workshops and a dedicated curriculum that brings cross-phase art education into classrooms worldwide through activities that give future Group Leaders ideas on how to use their Action for educational purposes.

As of August 2022, there have been 564 Group Actions in 450 schools, with over 60,000 portraits taken, pasted, and displayed, turning classrooms—and education—inside out.

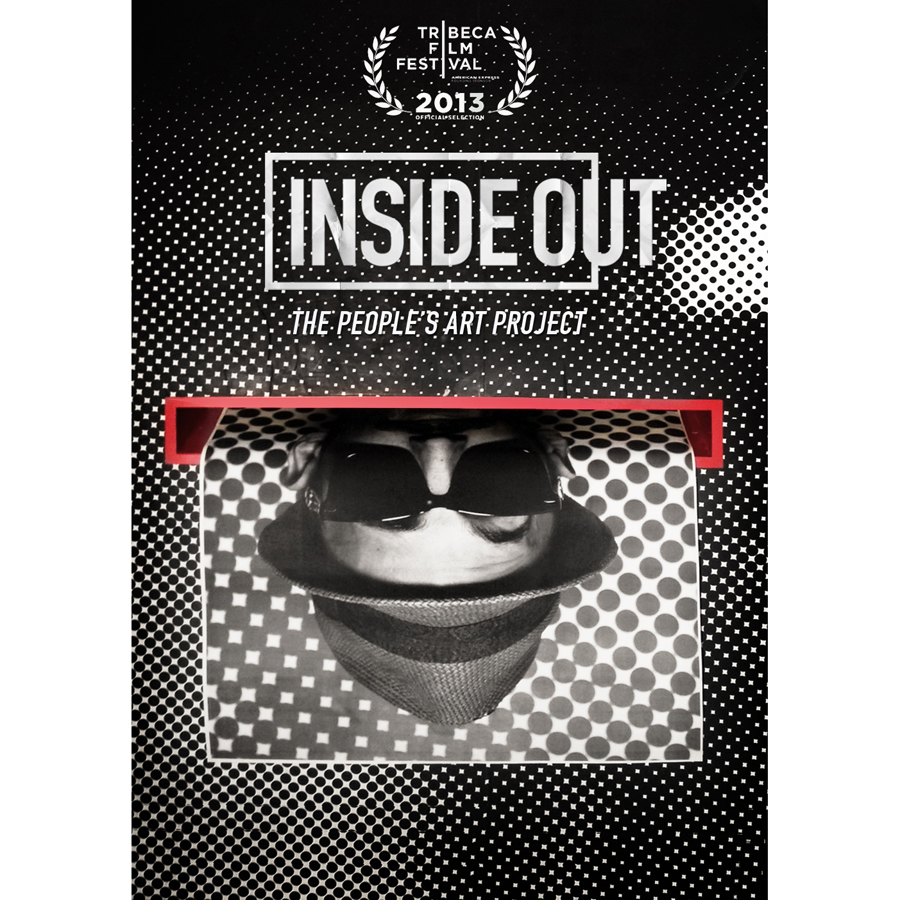
Official Poster for Inside Out film

== The process ==
Being a global participatory art project makes it easy for anyone around the world to participate, and it does not take much to get started. In order to begin this process, one may create an account on the website for the Inside Out Project. After that is completed, one may submit a Group Action: motivation can come from wanting to spread joy and celebrate life or protesting a serious issue in a community.

There must be at least 5 participants/models in a Group Action. The Action needs to make a statement about a cause or a message. The group leader must then send the portraits to the Inside Out studio, which will mail back 36x53 black-and-white posters for the participants to post in a public location of their choice. The exact rules of submitting a Group Action can be found in the Group Action Guidelines.

== Film ==
A film documenting the project, Inside Out: The People's Art Project was selected as an official Documentary Feature Spotlight at the 2013 Tribeca Film Festival, where the film premiered in Chelsea, New York City. The film then debuted exclusively on HBO in the US, where it is available for streaming. The film was directed by Alastair Siddons and produced by Emile Abinal.
