= Hizetjitwa Indigenous Peoples' Organization =

NGO operating in Angola and Namibia

The HIZETJITWA Indigenous Peoples Organisation (HIPO) is a non-governmental organisation operating in Namibia and Angola dedicated to the improvement of the living conditions of indigenous people. HIZETJITWA is an acronym made up of the first letters of the names of the indigenous tribes that are the focus of the organisation: Himba people, Zemba people, Tjimba people and Twa people. These native, semi nomadic people live in the mountainous and semi deserted areas of North West Kunene in Namibia and Angola. Individuals belonging to the Herero people in northern Kunene and from the Omusati Region (Ruacana area), are also members of HIPO. The executive director is Tjinezuma Kavari.

== Founding ==
HIPO was launched by the local people in 2007 and had by 2012 established committees in 85 communities, and an estimated membership of between 1,500 and 3,000. Around 40% of the members and 33% of the local committees are female, a good result in an otherwise male-dominated culture. Realising that continuing to be illiterate was detrimental to their culture and way of life, a special focus of the organisation is education.

HIPO works on 5-year plans, annual plans and 3-month plans as approved by the board. For 2010 the budget is N$980,000, including 80,000 for efforts in establishing a HIPO organization in Angola. The annual accounts are audited by an internationally recognized Namibian auditor. The Namibia Association of Norway (NAMAS) is the main funding source, with major contributions from the Norwegian government (Norad). NAMAS had previously supported the establishment of 40 schools for the native members in Northern Kunene, during the period from 1997 to 2007.

From a skeleton staff in 2008, the current HIPO administration now consists of an Executive Director, a Finance and Administration Officer and a Full Time Field Officer. In addition to this, there are 10 Field Officers who have been recruited from society members. An adviser funded by NAMAS has also been recruited.

The board members are elected in the annual meeting, to join the board for a 3-year period. The current board was elected in August 2010. The board consists of members from the different tribes, and from the different geographical areas in Northern Kunene.

== Motto ==
Development, Dignity, Unity.

== Logo ==
The logo consists of the ethnic groups holding hands, embracing the Welwitschia mirabilis (Otjiherero: Onjanga) .
