= Indigenous Peoples of Africa Co-ordinating Committee =

Main trans-national network organizations

IPACC logo

The Indigenous Peoples of Africa Co-ordinating Committee (IPACC) was founded in 1997. It is one of the main trans-national network organizations recognised as a representative of African indigenous peoples in dialogues with governments and bodies such as the UN. As of 2008, IPACC was composed of 150 member organisations in 21 African countries.

== Indigenous characteristics in the African setting ==
IPACC identifies several key characteristics associated with indigenous claims in Africa:

- political and economic marginalisation rooted in colonialism;
- de facto discrimination based often on the dominance of agricultural peoples in the State system (e.g. lack of access to education and health care by hunters and herders);
- the particularities of culture, identity, economy and territoriality that link hunting and herding peoples to their home environments in deserts and forests (e.g. nomadism, diet, knowledge systems);
- some indigenous peoples, such as the San and Pygmy peoples are physically distinct, which makes them subject to specific forms of discrimination.

With respect to concerns expressed that identifying some groups and not others as indigenous is in itself discriminatory, IPACC states that it:

- "...recognises that all Africans should enjoy equal rights and respect. All of Africa’s diversity is to be valued. Particular communities, due to historical and environmental circumstances, have found themselves outside the state-system and underrepresented in governance...This is not to deny other Africans their status; it is to emphasise that affirmative recognition is necessary for hunter-gatherers and herding peoples to ensure their survival."

== Activities ==
During the first United Nations International Decade of the World's Indigenous Peoples (1995–2004), IPACC concentrated on human rights standards and normative instruments, notably the UN Working Group on Indigenous Populations (WGIP) and the UN Declaration on the Rights of Indigenous Peoples.

In April 2007, IPACC leaders adopted a new strategy and action plan focussing on improving the engagement of indigenous peoples in policies dealing with the environment, natural resources and climate change. The plan of action, adopted in Bujumbura, Burundi sets out its main development goal as “…to demonstrate convincingly to influence makers and decision makers that indigenous peoples are holders of sophisticated indigenous (traditional) knowledge of the environment which is valuable to national resource management planning.”

The Bujumbura Action Plan has led to a number of IPACC initiatives to help its member organisations express primarily oral traditional ecological knowledge to decision makers with the help of information communication technology (notably geo-spatial information technology). This has included: an East African programme on Participatory 3 Dimensional Modelling (P3DM) with the Yiaku, Sengwer and Ogiek forest-based indigenous peoples; a southern African programme of formalising the assessment and qualification of traditional San trackers - including training with Cybertracker technology; and a pan-African conference on the relationship between Geospatial Information Technology (GIT), traditional ecological knowledge (TEK) and effective advocacy held in Windhoek, Namibia in August 2008. Participatory mapping projects are also under preparation in Niger and Gabon.

IPACC co-organised a consultative forum on Reduced Emissions from Deforestation and land Degradation (REDD) with Unissons pour la Promotion des Batwa (UNIPROBA in Burundi) and the World Bank. The IPACC REDD report noted that current insecure land tenure of mobile and indigenous peoples could lead to further displacements if REDD is not implemented with sufficient attention to safeguarding the rights of indigenous peoples as articulated in the 2007 UN Declaration on the Rights of Indigenous Peoples.

The recent IPACC strategy links indigenous knowledge of ecosystems and biodiversity with more classical advocacy for cultural and land rights necessary for the survival of herding and hunting communities. IPACC's environmental strategy is supported by important partnerships with the Technical Centre for Agricultural and Rural Cooperation (CTA) and UNESCO's Division for Intercultural Dialogue and Cultural Policies.

IPACC is a legally recognised cooperating partner and observer with the UN Environmental Programme (UNEP), with UNESCO, with the UN Economic and Social Council, the UN Convention on Biological Diversity Secretariat and with the African Commission on Human and Peoples' Rights (ACHPR).

== See also ==
- List of indigenous peoples
- African Commission on Human and Peoples' Rights
- Technical Centre for Agricultural and Rural Cooperation ACP-EU (CTA)
- United Nations Educational Scientific Cultural Organisation (UNESCO)
- United Nations Environmental Programme
