= List of Tajik musicians =

This list of Tajik musicians includes notable Tajik musicians.

== Tajikistan ==
=== Classical/Folk ===
- Davlatmand Kholov
- Fatima Kuinova
- Jurabek Murodov
- Shoista Mullojonova
- Tolib Shahidi
- Tuhfa Fozilova
- Suleiman Yudakov
- Yakhiel Sabzanov
- Zafar Nozim
- Ziyodullo Shahidi

=== Pop ===
- Karomatullo Qurbonov
- Nargis Bandishoeva
- Nigina Amonkulova
- Noziya Karomatullo
- Madina Aknazarova
- Manija Dawlat
- Tahmina Niyazova
- Kibriyo Rajabova
- Shabnam Surayyo
- Zulaykho

=== Rock/Metal ===
- Nobovar Chanorov
- Oleg Fesov
- Muboraksho Mirzoshoyev
- Daler Nazarov
- Parem

== Afghanistan ==
=== Classical/Ghazal ===
- Abdul Rahim Sarban
- Ahmad Wali
- Hangama
- Haidar Salim
- Jalil Zaland
- Nasrat Parsa
- Soheila Zaland
- Rahim Bakhsh
- Zheela

=== Pop ===
- Amir Jan Sabori
- Asad Badie
- Aryana Sayeed
- Farid Rastagar
- Ghazal Sadat
- Mojgan Azimi
- Mozhdah Jamalzadah
- Seeta Qasemi
- Parasto
- Rahim Jahani
- Rahim Mehryar
- Qader Eshpari
- Wajiha Rastagar

=== Folk ===
- Miri Maftun

== Uzbekistan ==
=== Pop ===
- Daler Xonzoda
- Feruza Jumaniyozova
- Nasiba Abdullaeva
- Shahzoda
- Yulduz Usmonova
