= Zaland =

Zaland (Pashto: ځلاند dzalānd; Persian: زلاند) is a Pashtun name meaning "bright" or "glowing". This name is also common among the non-Pashtuns of Afghanistan, including the Tajiks.

== People with the surname ==
- Jalil Zaland, Afghan singer
- Soheila Zaland, Afghan singer
