= Tolib Shakhidi =

Russian composer (born 1946)

Tolib-khon Shakhidi
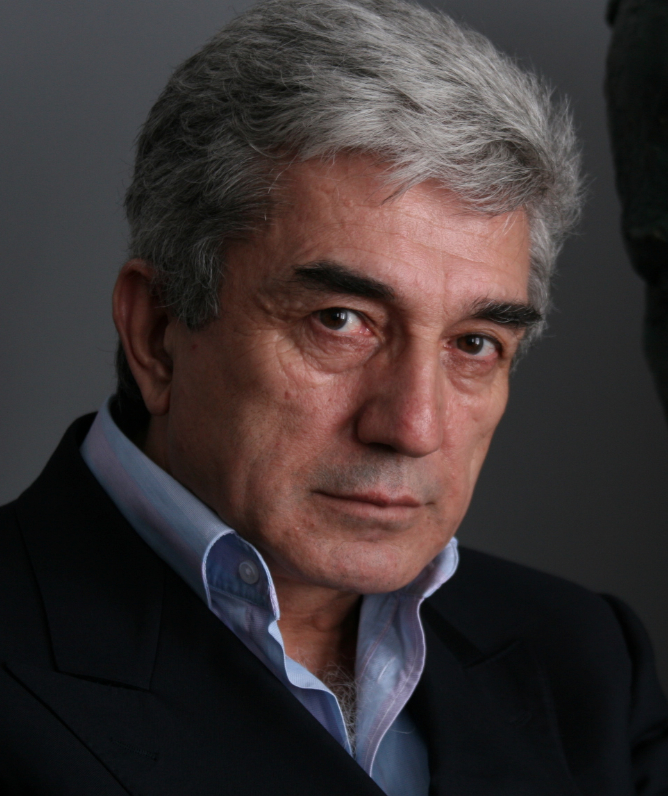
- Born: March 13, 1946 (age 80); Dushanbe
- Occupation: Composer
- Father: Ziyodullo Shakhidi

Tolib-khon Shakhidi (Толиб-хон Шахиди) or Tolib Shahidi (Tajik: Толиб Шаҳидӣ, Russian: Талиб Шахиди, born 13 March 1946) is a Tajik, Russian and Soviet composer who was born in the city of Dushanbe, Tajik SSR. He is a son of the founder of Professional Tajik Academic Music – Ziyodullo Shakhidi.

== Early life ==
Tolib-khon Shakhidi began his musical career at the age of fourteen. He graduated from the Musical College in Dushanbe in 1965 from the Composition Class of Uri Ter-Osipov.

== Career ==
From 1972 to this day, Tolib Shakhidi has participated in a number of music festivals. Tolib Shahidi specializes in contemporary music with inspirations from traditional Eastern music of his region.

He won the 2008 Georges Delerue Award for his score of the film Two-legged Horse.

== Personal life ==
Tolibkhon Shakhidi is married to Gulsifat Shakhidi.

== List of major works ==
- 1975 – Festival, symphonic poem
- 1978 – Death of usurer, suite of ballet
- 1978 – Tajiks, symphony No. 2
- 1980 – Rubai of Khaiam, film ballet
- 1981 – Charkh, symphony for chamber orchestra
- 1981 – Sonata No. 1 for piano
- 1981 – Recitative of Rumi, suite for flute and piano
- 1984 – Sado, symphonic poem
- 1988 – Caliph-stork, operas for children
- 1989 – Karlic-nose, operas for children
- 1989 – Beauty yosif, ballet
- 1991 – Sonata No. 2 for piano
- 1991 – Sonata No. 2 for piano and chamber orchestra
- 1992 – Siavush, ballet
- 1993 – Beauty and Monster, opera
- 1993 – Concerto for violin and chamber orchestra
- 1994 – Concerto No. 3 for piano and orchestra
- 1997 – Concerto No. 1 for string orchestra
- 1998 – Firdavsiada, concerto No. 2 for string orchestra
- 1998 – Sufi-dancer, music for 15 instruments
- 1998 – Istanbul-capricci, for saxophone and chamber orchestra.
- 1999 – Dobro vam, vocal cycle for tenor and symphonic orchestra. Poems of Hofiz, Goethe, Pushkin
- 1999 – Amir Ismoil, opera
- 2000 – Silk road dreams dancing, septet
- 2000 – Pictures under moon, for R. Finn poem, soprano and chamber orchestra
- 2001 – Algorismus marimba+, sextet
- 2001 – Contrasts in 55
- 2001 – Contrasts, music for violin and piano
- 2002 – King Lear, music for tragedy of Shakespeare
- 2002 – Persian Suite, music for string orchestra
- 2002 – Sufi and Buddha, pictures etude for piano
- 2004 – Concerto Grosso No. 3, for santur, violino solo and chamber orchestra
- 2005 – Contrast of times, vocal cycle for soprano and symphonic orchestra, words of Paul Valéry and Rekan
- 2007 – Birds talking, suite for three flute
- 2008 – Adagio, for violoncello solo in remembrance of Aram Khachaturian
- 2008 – Allegro in 5, for chamber ensemble
- 2008 – Four retro miniature for chorus A-Capella, in remembrance of Ziyodullo Shakhidi
- 2008 – Playing Backgammon, for piano
- 2009 – Verdi-Shakhidi, paraphrase for piano from opera Traviata
- 2010 – Concerto for clarinet and orchestra
- 2011 – Quartet for 4 cellos, from Indian Raga
- 2012 – Darius, pictures for Symphonic Orchestra
- 2012 – Adagio – Existence, for string orchestra
- 2013 – Rhapsody Dialogue: Theme of Aram Khachaturian, for piano and orchestra

== Discography ==
- Symphonic music (1997)
- Great Hall of Moscow State Conservatoire, Author Concert (1999)
- Symphonic Music (2004)
- Symphonic music and ballet extracts (2002)
- Movie Music & Existence – various music written for movies and theatre between 1969–2008 (2004)
- Concert featuring works of Tolibkhon Shakhdi, Live (2006)
- Gergiev-Shakhidi – Valery Gergiev, London Symphony Orchestra & Mariinsky Orchestra (2012)
- Anthology of piano music by Russian and Soviet composers, vol.7 – Melodija, (2014)

== See also ==
- Music of Tajikistan
