= Music of Badakhshan =

Location of Badakhshan, divided between Tajikistan in the north and Afghanistan in the south.

Badakhshan is a region of Tajikistan and Afghanistan with a unique musical heritage, especially that of the remote Pamiri Ismailis. Badakhshan's unique folk scene is said to be characteristed by the use of many chromatized tones (especially in falak) in a narrow melodic range, and the use of a characteristic minor-like scale .

== Instrumentation ==
Lutes are an extremely important part of Badakhshani music, especially the three-stringed shortneck lute played with a wooden plectrum; this is called the Pamiri rubab. Other varieties of lute in Badakhshan include the komus, a three-stringed but unfretted lute played by the Kyrgyz of eastern Badakhshan, the tanbur, a seven-stringed lute with sympathetic strings, the setar, with three melody strings and a number of sympathetic strings; the imported Afghan rubab and Azerbaijani tar are also a major part of Badakhshan's lute heritage .

Other instruments include the ney, a kind of flute, and the Ghaychak, a spiked fiddle; the circular frame drum daf is also common, as is the accordion, brought by Russians.

== Vocal music ==
Badakhshani music has a characteristic throaty, nasal sound which is a distinguishing characteristic of the area's vocal style. The madah is a kind of sung religious poetry, accompanied by rubabs and/or tanbyr with at least one daf .

== List of Badakhshani musicians ==
- Oleg Fesov from Gorno-Badakhshan, Tajikistan.
- Muboraksho Mirzoshoyev from Gorno-Badakhshan, Tajikistan.
- Daler Nazarov from Gorno-Badakhshan, Tajikistan.
- Nobovar Chanorov from Gorno-Badakhshan, Tajikistan.
- Madina Aknazarova his parents were from Gorno-Badakhshan, Tajikistan.
- Samandar Pulodov from Gorno-Badakhshan, Tajikistan.
- Temursho from Gorno-Badakhshan, Tajikistan.
- Takhmina of Avesto from Gorno-Badakhshan, Tajikistan.
