= Azimi =

Azimi (Persian: عظیمی; derived from Azim) is an Arabic and Persian surname. Notable people with the surname include:

Reza Azimi, Persian minister of war for Iran

- Mojgan Azimi (born 1985), Afghan singer and painter
- Abdul Salam Azimi (1936–2026), Afghan jurist
- Bahman ("Ben") Azimi Barrister and Solicitor in Canada
