= Music of Tajikistan =

Tajik music is closely related to other Central Asian forms of music. The classical music is shashmaqam, which is also distinctive in Uzbekistan. Southern Tajikistan has a distinctive form of folk music called falak, which is played at celebrations for weddings, circumcisions and other occasions.

== Tajik folk music ==
Tajik folk music is traditionally divided into three styles, Pamir (Mountain-Badakhshan province), Central Kuhistoni (Hisor, Kulob, Gharm provinces) and Sogdiana's northern style; the latter is part of the same musical culture as the adjacent regions of Uzbekistan (Kashkadarya Province and Surkhandarya Province). There are many kinds of songs, both lyrical and instrument, including work songs, ceremonial, funeral, wedding and musical epics, especially the central Tajik heroic legend Gurugli also known as "Omar Sham Sham".

=== Gharibi ===
Gharibi is the song of a stranger, an early 20th-century innovation of poor farm laborers and other workers who had to leave their land.

=== Holiday music ===
Gulgardoni is a springtime holiday (also called Boychechak) which includes carolling celebratory songs accompanied by the dutar and doira.

Sayri Guli Lola is the holiday of tulips, which includes accompanied choral and dance music. The most important song of this holiday is called "Naqshi Kalon".

The birth of a child is cause for special musical celebration. Traditional puppeteers play on the doira, qayroq, surnay and nag'ora. There are other variations, and folk songs like "Na`at" and "Munojot", performed at the circumcision ceremony of a male child.

Traditional Tajik wedding music is played by sozanda, professional musicians, mostly female, who are part of ensembles called the dasta.

=== Badakhshan ===
Badakhshan is a region inhabited by Tajik Ismailis, known for their sung spiritual poetry called madah. Lutes are a major part of Ismaili folk music.

== See also ==
- List of Tajik musicians
- List of Tajik singers
- Persian pop music

== Bibliography ==
- Broughton, Simon and Sultanova, Razia. "Bards of the Golden Road". 2000. In Broughton, Simon and Ellingham, Mark with McConnachie, James and Duane, Orla (Ed.), World Music, Vol. 2: Latin & North America, Caribbean, India, Asia and Pacific, pp 24-31. Rough Guides Ltd, Penguin Books. ISBN 1-85828-636-0
