= Zheela =

- Born: Kobra; 15 July 1943; Kabul, Kingdom of Afghanistan
- Died: 28 June 2009 (aged 65) California, United States
- Genres: Ghazal; pop
- Occupations: Singer, actress
- Years active: 1957–2001
- Labels: Afghan Radio Television

Zheela (Dari: ژیلا), July 15, 1943 – June 28, 2009) was an Afghan singer.

== Early life ==
Zheela (Persian: ژیلا) was born in Kabul, Afghanistan to Sardar Mohammed Kabir Khan, a banker. When she was five years old, her mother died. Zheela had three sisters, one of whom, Sara, married the Afghan singer Ustad Jalil Zaland. Zheela developed an interest in singing at a young age, and by her teen years, was singing at family events. She completed eighth grade at Zarghona Middle School at which point she was pressed to become a singer at the encouragement of her social circle who had attended her performances.

== Career ==
Zheela entered the Afghan music industry at that age of 14. With the support of her brother-in-law Ustad Jalil Zaland and the encouragement of Afghan singer Parveen, who had noticed the teen perform in family events, Zheela started her career under the mentorship of Ustad Khyal who trained the singer for five years in various musical instruments. She also received some assistance from Ustad Shayda, the man who suggested she adopt the professional name Zheela after attending her first concert.

In addition to her solo work, Zheela also had collaborations on her songs, often in the form of duets with such singers as Ahmad Zahir, Jalil Zaland, and Ustad Khyal. But her most notable collaboration came in 1964 when she sang a duet with Mohammed Rafi, India's most prolific singer at the time. Their song became hugely popular on Kabul Radio as this was the first time that an Indian singer sang in Persian. In 1973, Zheela performed in the musical play “رفیقان بی وفا” that brought her some notability as an actress.

== Later life ==
Due to the political situation, Zheela left Afghanistan in the early 1980s. She initially traveled with her family to Karachi, Pakistan, and after staying there 13 months, she immigrated to US state of California in 1982. After this time, her involvement in the Afghan music scene was limited but ongoing. From 1983 to 2001 Zheela's professional career was marked by performances in concerts in the United States and Canada, often in collaboration with other Afghan singers. In 2001, she officially retired from singing.

== Works ==
Zheela has 482 certified radio songs and 13 songs for the television. In 1996, Zheela's music was copyrighted with the Library of Congress Some of her solos: Tu Omide Man, On ke Ze Dar Merasad, Dar In Mahfil, Qarya, Yaar e Paiman Shikan, Amadayee Dair Baad, To Baa Bahar Bia, Dar e Dil ra Ba Roye Ghair Bastam, Nala Makun, Yarem Az Dar, Baaz Dar Manzil e Man, Sabza Zamarudeen
