= Yakhiel Sabzanov =

Soviet Bukharian Composer

Yakhiel Rafaelovich Sabzanov (Tajik: Якуб Рафаэлович Сабзанов; Russian: Яхиэль Рафаэлович Сабзанов) (February 20, 1929 – September 10, 2013) was a Soviet Bukharian composer of Bukharan Jewish descent.

== Life ==
Yakhiel Sabzanov (1962)

Yakhiel Sabzanov, a Bukharian Jew, was born in Dushanbe, and discovered his passion for music as a young boy in the early 1940's. His first teacher named Nasimjon Pulatov taught him how to play a folk instrument called gidzhak. As Sabzanov became more proficient in gidzhak, he started taking lessons in another folk instrument called tunbura, which is an ancient folk string instrument. His teacher was legendary Shashmakom expert Neryo Aminov, who was a singer and musician. In addition to those instruments, Sabzanov learned how to play a third stringed instrument called Rubabe from the Peoples Artist of Tajikistan Avner Mullokandov. In 1943, Sabzanov entered the music school located in S. Ayni Theater of Opera and Ballet taught by Nadezhda Andreyevna Budkevich, an Honored worker of Arts in Tajikistan. Sabzanov continued to study Gidzhak in Music School and learned under R. Shakhmurov. There he acquired the foundation of performance on a gidzhak. With the help of R. Shakhmurov the young student became a part of Tajik folk instrument orchestra.

In 1946, after successfully graduating from the music school, Sabzanov was transferred to a music college, specializing in gidjak and stringed instruments. His teachers included cellist Samuil Markovich Frenkel and a violinist Semyon Solomonovich Muravin. Simultaneously he studied composition under the direction of Alexander Stepanovich Lenskiy.

After completing a four-year music college program in just three years with honors, Sabzanov felt compelled to further his musical education. Following a letter from the Ministry of Culture of Tajikistan and successfully passing all exams, he gained admission to the Tashkent Conservatory class of 1955 under G.Mushel. At the time, the conservatory was directed by Mukhtar Ashrafi, the renowned Uzbek composer and conductor. Graduating with honors as an aspiring composer, Sabzanov's achievements continued to grow. In 1956, at the second convention of Tajikistan composers, he was accepted into the Association of Composers of the USSR and appointed as an administrative officer and secretary of the Association of Composers of Tajikistan.

In 1956, Sabzanov married the granddaughter of a former manufacturer from Kokand, Sara Babayevna Pinkhasova.

Sabzanov became one of the most distinguished and respected Tajik composers of the 20th century.

== Compositions ==
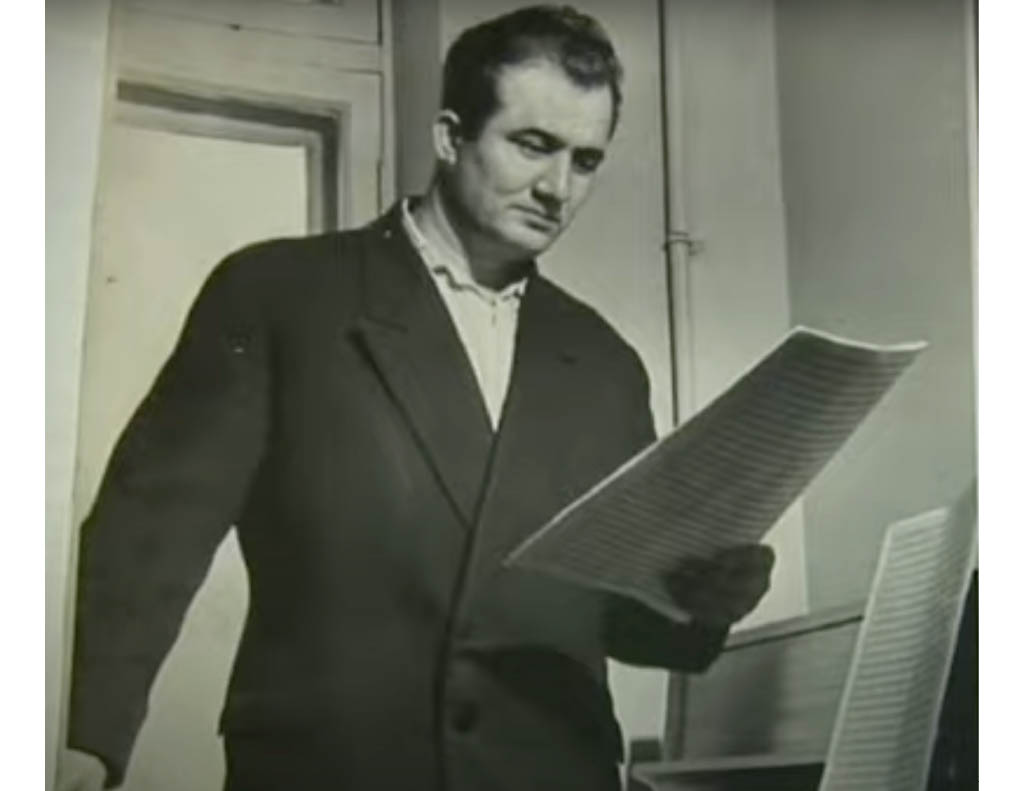
Composer Yakhiel Rafaelovich Sabzanov

Sabzanov's oeuvre consists of more than 300 works, including opera, The Return (libretto by A. Shukukhi, 1967), opera Examination (libretto by F. Ansori, 1991), oratorio The Lights of Nurek (lyrics by A. Bakhori, 1978), Concerto for Piano and Orchestra (1955), Symphonic poem Homage to Rudaki, symphonic and vocal-symphonic poems The Lyric Pamir, Makom, The Cranes, My Century. Yakhiel Sabzanov created more than 100 songs and romances, cantatas, musical comedies and dramas, as well as film scores including famous song Ba Dilbar sung by Shoista Mullodzhanova and lyrics by Mirzo Tursunzoda. More than 100 of his works have been in print as sheet music by the publishers of Moscow, Leningrad, Kiev, Tashkent, and Dushanbe and issued as gramophone records by the Melodia Company. Sabzanov compiled a number of anthologies: Lakhuti in Music, Hafiz in Music, Songs and Romances by the Tajik Composers, Children Songs, A Reader of Tajik Composer's Symphonic Scores, and others.

== Published Works ==
- 1954: "A Pamir Lyrical Song-Poem," in Collection of Pieces for the Violin and Piano. Edited by M.B. Reison. USSR State Publishers, Tashkent. 9 pages.
- 1956:"Mo Nasli Navras" (We Are the Young Generation), lyrics by A. Sidki;"Mekhnat Saodati Mo" (Labor Is Our Happiness), lyrics by U. Rajabov.Songs. "Prepare for the Festival," "For Peace and friendship". Republican House of People's Arts, Stalinabad.
- 1957: "Mo Nasli Navras" (We Are the Young Generation), lyrics by A. Sidki, translated by B. Kirilov; "Bakhori Orzui Mun" (The Spring of My Dreams), lyrics by B. Khoji; "Az Kadat Gardam" (I Am Conquered by You), lyrics by M. Farkhat, "Badekha" (Folk Songs), lyrics by I. Nivin. Surudcho. Songs.Kh. Mullokandov, music editor. Republican House of People's Arts, Stalinabad 9 pages
- 1958: "Didori Duston" (The Joy of Meeting Friends), lyrics by A. Rudaki. 1100th Anniversary of Rudaki. Kh, Mullokandov, music editor. Republican House of People's Arts. Fourth installment. Stalinabad. 5 pages.
- 1959: "Gunjilshkak" (Birdie), lyrics by U. Rajabov; "Obaki Shirini Mo" (Our Sweet Water), lyrics by M. Murshar; "Soli Nav" (New Year), lyrics by T Pulodi.Surud va Musiki. Song and Music for elementary and secondary schools. I. Rogalskiy, S. Sakhibov, E Shakhabov, compilers. State Educational Literature Publishers of the Ministry of Education of the Tadjik SSR Stalinabad. 3 pages.
- 1960: "Az Kadat Gardam" (I Am Enchanted by You); clavier of a song in Tajik and Russian. Tajikgosizdat, Stalinabad. 6 pages.
- 1961: "Didori Duston" (The Joy of Meeting Friends). Romance song. Translated by B. Kirillov. Songs and Romances to Lyrics from Rudaki. M. Tzvetayev, Z. Shakhidi, F. Shakhobov, compilers. Tajikgosizdat, Stalinabad. 3 pages.
- 1961: "Kishvari Mo" (Our Country), lyrics by Bobokhodja'. Translated by S.Bolotin. Folk melody modified by Y. Sabzanov. Amateur Performances.Kh. Mullokondov, music editor. The House of People's Arts, Stalinabad. 6pages.
- 1961: "Of Lenin." Taiik folk song modified by Y. Sabzanov. Amateur Performances. The House of People's Arts, Stalinabad. 1 page.
- 1962: "A Nightingale's Voice," original folk melody and lyrics modified by Y. Sabzanov. Translated by B. Popov. Tajik Folk Songs. Modified for voice or chorus and piano. Sovietskiy Compositor Publishing House, Moscow, J.5.5 pages.
- 1962: "Norak Myborak" (A Song about Nurek), lyrics by B. Rakhimzade.Tajikistan magazine, Dushanbe, January. 1 page.
- 1962:'To the Memory of Rudaki," a score of a symphonic poem. Sovietskiy Compozitor Publishing House, Moscow. 5,5 pages.
- 1962: "Zeboii Khaet" (The Reality of Life), clavier of a romance in Tajik and Russian. 3 songs. State Publishing House of Tajikistan, Dushanbe. 12 pages.

Composer, professor, musicologist, community activist member of the Union of Composers of the USSR (1956), Honored Artist of Tajikistan (1974), People's Artist of Tajikistan (1989)

- 1962: "Surudhoi Liriki-Vatanparva( Lyrical-Patriotic Songs), clavier in Tajik and Russian. Three songs. State Publishing House of Tajikistan Dushanbe. 2.5 pages
- 1963: Two Dances for gidjak (or violin) and piano. Slate Publishing House of Dushanbe. 3 p.s.
- 1964: "Bachagoni Bakhlyor (Happy Childhood), lyrics by M. Farkhat. Translated by M. Fofanova. Songs. Song festival on a stadium, dedicated to the 40th anniversary of Tadjik SSR. Goscomizdat of Tajik SSR, Dushanbe, October. 1 page.
- 1967: Seven Short Pieces for the Piano, Irfon Publishing House, Dushanbe. 5
- 1967: Lakhuti in Music, a clavier of over 30 songs and romances by Tajik and Uzbek composers, in Tajik and Russian. Includes three songs by Y. Sabzanov: "Peace Fighters' Song", "Heart's Plea", "Healing the Sour". Ateya Lakhuti and Yakhiel Sabzanov, compilers. Irfon Publishing House, Dushanbe. 26 p.s.
- 1968:"Dance Suite for a symphonic orchestra, a score. Sovietskiy Compozitor Publishing House, Moscow 6 p.s.
- 1969: "Darsy Rubob" (Training for Rubob). J. Obidov, author. Includes 10 works by Y.Sabzanov. Irfon Publishing House, Dushanbe. 2.5 p.s.
- 1970: "A Song of Youth", lyrics by F. Ansory, translated by M. Fofanova. Of Lenin, of Motherland. Vocal works for a voice accompanied by piano. Second installment. Muzika Publishing house Moscow. 6 pages.
- 1971: "Gafiz in music", clavier of about 30 songs and romances by Tajik com-posers, in Tajik. Includes two songs by Y. Sabzanov. Y. Sabzanov, com-piler. Irfon Publishing House, Dushanbe. 13.5 p.s.
- 1971: "Dukhtary Tojikiston" (A Tajikistan Girl), "Yori Maschokhiyam" (My Sweetheart from Matcho), "Bakhor" (The Spring). Asarkhoyi bastakarony tojik. The Works by Tdjik composers for violin and piano. (I. Flisfeyder, compiler. Irfon Publishing House, Dushanbe. 5 pages.
- 1971: "Piano Works by Tajik Composers" for musical schools and colleges. R.Ayrapetyants, compiler. Includes 11 works by Y.Sabzanov. Irfon Publishing House, Dushanbe, 3 p.s.
- 1972: "Yory Jon" (A Bosom Friend. Translated in Russian by V. Kirilov, in Ukraine by V.Strutinsky. Tie folk song modified by Yakhiel Sabzanov. "Partiyayi jonojon " (To My Dear Party). Lyrics by A. Bakhory. Translated in Russian by L. Tatarenko, in Ukraine by V.Strutinsky. The Songs of Tajikistan. Sh. Sayfitdinov, compiler. Muzichna Ukraina Publishing House, Kiev. 8 pages.
- 1972: "Waltz", by O. Nazarov, Y.Sabzanov. "Savty roro", folk melody modified by Y.Sabzanov. The Works by Tajik composers for gidjak and piano. A. Muborakshoev, A. Toshmatov, compilers. Irfon Publishing House, Dushanbe. 5 pages.
- 1972: "Pamir Lyric Kushugi" (Pamir Lyric Song). Training for gidjak-viola. A.I. Davidov, compiler. Ukituvchi Publishing House, Tashkent. 2 p.
- 1972: "Songs", clavier (8 songs) in Russian. Sovetsky Compositor Publishing House, Moscow. 5,5 p.s.
- 1972: Tajik folk songs modified by Yakhiel Sabzanov translated by V.Kirillov:Yory jon" (A Bosom Friend), "Bakhory Dil" (The Spring of the Heart), "Kishvary Mo" (Our Country), "Dilangez" '(Emotion of the Heart), "Duchtary Pakhtachin" (A Girl, Cotton Picker); translated by Ts. Bonu: "Kuwayi Sulkh" (The Peace Forces), "Intizori Didor" (I am Waiting for My Girl), "Nozam" (I am Proud of My Darling). Surudhoi khalkiyi tochiki. Tajik Folk Songs. Sh. Sakhibov, I.Rogalsky, F.Shakhobov, M.Rakhimi, compil-ers. Volume 1, 1966; Volume 2, 1970; Volume 3, 1974. Irfon Publishing House, Dushanbe. 5 p.s.
- 1974: "Songs and Romances by Tajik Composers", clavier in Russian. Includes two songs and romance by Y. Sabzanov. Y.Sabzanov, compiler. Muzika Publishing House, Moscow. 6,5 p.s.
- 1975: "Gunishkak" (Birdie), "Shukhi" (A Joke), "Ba Muallim" (To My Teacher), "Sarchash-mai Orzy" (The Source of Happiness), "Bachagoni Bakhtior" (The Happy Childhood), "Obaki Shirini Mo" (Our Sweetie Water), "Shirinzabonam" (My Smooth-Tongued Girl), "Soly Nav" (The New Year). Musical Dictations (based on Tajik melodies). For musical schools, colleges and Institute of Arts. J. Okhunov, compiler. Irfon Publishing House, Dushanbe. 2 pages.
- 1975: "Waltz", "A Sad Song", "A Playful Girl". Children Pieces for Piano by Tajik Composers. M.Gubaydulina and S. Kuznetsov, editors and compilers. Muzika Publishing House, Moscow. 4 pages.
- 1975: "Songs by Tajik Composers", clavier in Tajik. Includes four songs by Y.Sabzanov. Y.Sabzanov, compiler. Irfon Publishing House, Dushanbe. 18 p.s.
- 1976: "Ariyayi Sodik" (An Aria of Sadik), from the opera "Return". Vocal Works for a Tenor (Reader-book). A.Babakulov, compiler. Irfon Publishing House, Dushanbe. 2 p.s.
- 1976: "Collected Exercises in Vocalization" for high-pitched voice, clavier (A. Babakulov, co-author). Irfon Publishing House, Dushanbe. 9 pages.
- 1976: "Pieces for Bayan by Tajik Composers", for musical schools. M. Davidov, compiler. Includes five works by Y.Sabzanov. Irfon Publishing House, Dushanbe. 6 pages.
- 1976: "Songs and Romances by Tajik Composers", clavier in Russian. Includes the poem "Cranes" by Y.Sabzanov. Y.Sabzanov, compiler. Muzika Publishing House, Moscow. 6 p.s.
- 1977: "Children Pieces for Piano by Tajik Composers". M.Gubaydulina and S.Kuznetsov, compilers. Includes four works by Y. Sabzanov. Sovetsky Compositor Publishing House, Moscow. 5 pages.
- 1977: "Birdies Chat". M.Davidov, editor. Pieces for Bayan by Soviet Composers. A. Kostin and M. Chemberdin, compilers. Muzichna Ukraina Publishing House, Kiev. 2 pages.
- 1977: "Ariyayi Malokhat" (An Aria of Malokhat), from the opera "Return". Collected Vocal and Pedagogical Repertory by Tajik Composers. Khanifa Movlyanova, compiler. Irfon Publishing House, Dushanbe. 5 pages.
- 1977: "Songs for Children", clavier of more than 50 songs by Tajik composers. Includes nine songs by Y.Sabzanov. Y.Sabzanov, compiler. Irfon Publishing House, Dushanbe. 20 p.s.
- 1978: "To My Dear Party". Song – cantata, lyrics by F.Ansory, translated by M.Lapisov. Our Beloved Country. Choruses by Soviet composers. Muzika Publishing House, Moscow. 1 p.s.
- 1978: "Return", an opera's clavier. Muzika Publishing House, Moscow. 24,5 p.s.
- 1978: "The Lights of Nurek", an oratorio's clavier. Sovetsky Compositor Publishing House, Moscow,. 13 p.s.
- 1980: "Okhang" (A Melody). A folk melody modified by Y. Sabzanov. Melodies for Dutar. For musical schools and colleges. D. Erov, K.Kurbanov, compilers. Irfon Publishing House, Dushanbe. 0,5 p.s.
- 1980: "Rusiya – Tojikiston " (Russia – Tajikistan), lyrics by M.Farkhal. "Dushanbeyi Bakhoron" (Spring Dushanbe), lyrics by F.Ansory. "Ganchi kafi dekhkon" (Fruits of Peasant's Hands), lyrics by A.Sidki. Sozu Navoyi Buston (Songs and Melodies of a Flower Garden). J. Okhunov, compiler. House of People's Arts. Irfon Publishing House, Dushanbe. 2 p.s.
- 1981: Four Etudes. Etudes for Bayan, for different types of technique. Fourth remaked edition. A.F.Nechiporenko, V.V.Ugrinovich, editors and compil-ers. Muzichna Ukraina Publishing House, Kiev. 2 pages.
- 1982:Chorus from the opera "Return" ("Bozgasht"): Girls' Song from second scene. Soldiers* Song from fourth scene, Spring Song from seventh scene, Song of Happiness ("Shodi-shodi") from sixth scene. Choruses from Tajik Operas. K.Kharimov, I.Khromchenko, compilers. Irfon Publishing House, Dushanbe. 5,5 p.s.
- 1982: "My Sweetheart City", lyrics by F.Ansory, translated by V.Butenko. This is My Motherland. Songs of the Soviet Republics. For voice and chorus accompanied by piano (bayan and guitar). Muzika Publishing House, Moscow. 0,5 p.s.
- 1982: "A Girls' Dance". Pieces for Piano. IADashkova, compiler. Fifteenth installment. Medium classes of the children musical school. Sovetsky Compositor Publishing House, Moscow. 1 page.
- 1983: "March". "Boloyi", Folk melodies modified by Y.Sabzanov. Training for rubab-prima. N.Abdulloev, A.Amonov, compilers. Irfon Publishing House, Dushanbe. 1 page.
- 1983: "Ba Mualin" (To MV Teacher), lyrics by F.Iskhoky. "Surudy Javony A song of Youth), lyrics by M. Tursun-Zade. Gulchiny Surudkho. Selected songs for amateur performances. Kh. Abdulloev, compiler. Irfon Publishing House, Dushanbe. 3 pages.
- 1983: "Darsi Gidjak" (Training for Gidjak) for musical schools and colleges. Kh. Diumaev and J. Okhunov, compilers. Includes three works by Y.Sabzanov. Irfon Publishing House, Dushanbe. 3 pages.
- 1984: "Fugue" E-minor (four-part). Fugues by Tajik Composers. A. Yadgarov, ed-tor and compiler. Goscomizdat of Tajik SSR, Dushanbe. 4 pages.
- 1984: "Raks" (A Dance). Training for Doyra. For musical schools and colleges. Sh. Fakhriev, compiler. Irfon Publishing House, Dushanbe. 2 pages.
- 1984: Reading-book of Symphonic Scores by Tajik Composers. First Part. String group. Educational supplies. Cultural Ministry, Dushanbe. 8 p.s.1985 "Raksy Liriki' (A Lyric Dance) from the opera 'Return". "Bakhory Mar" My Spring), fantasia. Music by T.Ulmasov, Y.Sabzanov. Melodies of Chang. For chang and piano. For musical schools and colleges. T. Ulmasov and Kh. Ruzadorov, compilers. Won Publishing House, Dushanbe. 2 p.s.
- 1985: Song of Malokhat from the opera "Return", lyrics by A.Shukukhy, translated by A.Berdnikov. Selected Arias of Operas by Soviet Composers. For soprano accompanied by piano. Pedagogical repertory. V.Aleksandrova, V.Teploukhova. Muzika Publishing House, Leningrad. 0,5 p.s.
- 1985: "Prelude C-minor", Waltz "Pakhta" (Cotton), "March". Collected Works by Tajik Composers, arrangement for bayan. Educational supplies. O. Y.Kayumov, compiler. Goscomizdat of Tajik SSR, Dushanbe. 2 p.s.
- 1985: "The Flower of Tulip". Folk melody modified by Y.Sabzanov. Pedagogical Repertory for Gidjak. (Educational supplies). N.Abdullaev, Kh. Djumaiv, compilers. Goscomizdat of Tajik SSR, Dushanbe. 2 pages.
- 1985: "Pieces for Piano", junior classes of the children musical school. D.Sakharova, compiler. Includes six works by Y.Sabzanov. Sovetsky Compositor Publishing House, Moscow. 6 pages.
- 1986: "Zamzamai ishk" (Glorifying Love), "Shirinzabonam" (My Smooth Girl). Works by Tajik Composers, for unaccompanied chorus. I. Dudukina, compiler. Goscomizdat of Tajik SSR, Dushanbe. 2 p.s.
- 1986: Reading-book of Symphonic Scores by Tajik Composers. Second Part. Transposition in the pitch of B and F. Educational supplies. Cultural Ministry, Dushanbe. 7,5 p.s.
- 1986: "Concerto for Piano with Symphony Orchestra", clavier. Irfon Publishing House, Dushanbe. 7,5 p.s.
- 1987: "A Pilot", lyrics by F.Iskhaki, translated by L. Dimova. Fifteen Sisters. Songs and poems for schoolchildren. Singing accompanied by piano. G. Nazaryan and E.Domrina, compilers. Muzika Publishing House, Moscow. 2 pages.
- 1987: "Chastukhezkunak" (A Skipping-Rope), "Ohang" (A Melody). Sozu Navoi Gidjak (Songs and Melodies of Gidjak). Kh. Djumaev, compiler. Goscomizdat of Tajik SSR, Dushanbe. 1 page.
- 1987: "Darie", lyrics by Kutbi Kirom. Taronakhoi Zamon (Contemporary Songs).

For amateur performances. Kh. Abdulloev, compiler. Adib Publishing House, Dushanbe. 1 page.

- 1987: "Pieces for Violin and Piano by Soviet Composers". Eighth installment.

Includes "Pamir Lyric Song-Poem" by Y.Sabzanov. Sovetsky Compositor 1988 "Romance" Publishing House, Moscow. 2 p.s.

- 1988: "Romance", "Pamir Lyric Song-Poem". Songs and Melodies of Gidjak. Pieces for gidjak and piano. Compiling and methodical instructions by A. Muborakshoev. Y. Sabzanov, musical editor. Goscomizdat of Tajik SSR, Dushanbe. 2 p.s.
- 1989: "Soly Nav" (New Year), lyrics by T.Pulodi; "Bachagoni bakhtier" (Happy Childhood), lyrics by M.Farkhat; "Mo Nasly Navras" (The Young Generation), lyrics by A.Sidki; "Sarchashmayi Orzu" The Source of Happiness), lyrics by M.Farkhat. Chorus Songs by Tajik Composers (Reading-book). D. Kuchkarov, compiler. Goscomizdat of Tajik SSR, Dushanbe. 1 p.s.
- 1989: "To the Memory of Rudaki", clavier of the symphonic poem. Cultural Ministry of Tajikistan, Dushanbe. 7,5 p.s.
- 1989: "Makom", clavier of the symphonic poem. Cultural Ministry of Tajikistan, Dushanbe. 7.5 p.s.
- 1989: "My Darling Tajikistan", clavier (songs for schoolchildren), 12 songs in Russian. Sovetsky Compositor Publishing House, Moscow. 6 p
- 1989: "Surudho Baroyi Maktabbachagon" (Schoolchildren Songs), clavier (29 songs). Maorif Publishing House, Dushanbe. 10 p.s.
- 1990: "Surudi Mo" (Our Song), clavier of the collection of songs (33 songs and romances). Alib Publishing House, Dushanbe. 20 p.s.
- 1991: Ensembles for Chang and Piano. Educational supplies. U. Khojiev. compil-er. Includes three works by Y. Sabzanov. Cultural Ministry of Tajikistan, Dushanbe. 4 pages.
- 1991: "Training for Badakhshan Rubab" by M.Barotov. M.Barotov, compiler. Includes five works by Y. Sabzanov. Adib Publishing House, Dushanbe. 4 pages.
- 1995: "Raks" (A Dance). Gijak Darsligi (Training for Gidiak). M. Tashmukhamedov, compiler. Ukituvchi Publishing House, Tashkent

== Honors ==
Yakhiel Rafaelovich Sabzanov (born 1929 Dushanbe) Composer, musicologist, community activist member of the Union of Composers of the USSR (1956), recipient of the titles Honored Artist of Tajikistan (1974), People's Artist of Tajikistan (1989), professor, head of the Department of Composition, instrumentation and Score-reading of the Tajik Institute of Art (1977–1992), laureate and award winner of national and regional competitions of composers. He was twice elected as Executive and Deputy Secretary of the Tajik Composers' Union, had been a six time delegate to the All-Union Congresses of the USSR composers.

== America ==
Yakhiel Sabzanov immigrated to the United States in 1992 with his wife, Sara and three children, Neyla, Arkadiy and Petr Sabzanov. In 1993 a fragment of his opera The Return was played by The New American Chamber Orchestra which was composed of Soviet refugees and conducted by Beth Cohen in Carnegie Hall . While in America Sabzanov put out two volumes entitled "Y. R. Sabzanov, Life in Music" (New York, 1999, 2006). His great-grandson, Joshua Mishail, who is also a composer, continues his legacy by posting Yakhiel Sabzanov's compositions and scores on various websites and music platforms.

== Death ==
Yakhiel Rafaelovich Sabzanov died on September 10, 2013, in New York.
