= Kibriyo Rajabova =

Tajik pop singer

Kibriyo Rajabova (Tajik: Кибриё Раҷабова) is a Tajik pop singer. In October 2005, she was granted the "Honoured Worker of Tajikistan" award by Tajikistan President Emomalii Rahmon on the occasion of Tajikistan Culture Day in a ceremony held at Dushanbe headquarters of UNESCO.
