= Karomatullo Qurbonov =

- Born: Karomatullo Ajikovich Qurbonov; 29 November 1961; Kulob, Tajik SSR
- Origin: Dushanbe, Tajikistan
- Died: 17 October 1992 (aged 30) Yovon, Tajikistan
- Genres: Pop
- Occupation: Singing

Karomatullo Qurbonov (Tajik: Кароматулло Қурбонов, Russian: Кароматулло Курбанов; 29 November 1961 – 17 October 1992) was a popular pop singer and composer from Tajikistan. On 17 October 1992 Qurbonov and a number of his band members were murdered by gunmen from the Popular Front militia. Qurbonov was one of a number of intellectual and cultural figures murdered during the Tajik Civil War. In 2008 a former member of the Popular Front, Mahmadahdi Nazarov, also known as Makhsum Mahdi, was convicted of Qurbonov's murder.

Qurbonov's daughter, Noziya Karomatullo, is one of the most popular musicians in Tajikistan today.
