= Two-legged Horse =

2008 Iranian film directed by Samira Makhmalbaf

- Directed by: Samira Makhmalbaf
- Written by: Mohsen Makhmalbaf
- Produced by: Maysam Makhmalbaf; Mohsen Makhmalbaf; Samira Makhmalbaf; Mehrdad Zonnour
- Starring: Ziya Mirza Mohamad; Haron Ahad
- Cinematography: Farzad Jadat
- Edited by: Mohsen Makhmalbaf
- Distributed by: Wild Bunch Distribution (France)
- Release date: September 6, 2008 (Toronto International Film Festival)
- Running time: 101 minutes
- Country: Iran
- Languages: Persian, Uzbek

Two-legged Horse (Persian: اسب دوپا, romanized: Asbe du-pa) is a 2008 film directed by Samira Makhmalbaf and written by her father Mohsen Makhmalbaf. The film is about a one-legged child that hires another poor child to carry him around on his back. The film was filmed in and takes place in Afghanistan.

== Plot ==
A poor boy has to compete with other poor children to find a job. The winner is the child who is better able to pick up a child who lost his legs in the war to go to school. The race begins and the poor boy wins. For $1 a day, the boy picks up a stray boy like a horse every day and takes him to and from school. When he has him on his back, he races with donkeys and horses roaming the streets. He takes him to the bathroom at home and makes him ride on a swing, but the legless boy is unhappy with him because he has not yet gotten a horse like he wants.

== Awards ==
- Special Mention Award from the 2008 Rome International Film Festival, Italy
- Georges Delerue Award for Best Soundtrack (composed by Tolib Shakhidi) at the 2008 Film Fest Gent, Belgium.
- Special Jury Prize from the 56th San Sebastian International Film Festival, Spain 2008
