= Violet (2014 film) =

2014 drama film

- Theatrical release poster
- Directed by: Bas Devos
- Screenplay by: Bas Devos
- Produced by: Petra Goedings; Tomas Leyers
- Starring: Cesar De Sutter; Koen De Sutter; Mira Helmer; Raf Walschaerts
- Cinematography: Nicolas Karakatsanis
- Edited by: Dieter Diependaele
- Release dates: 12 February 2014 (Berlin); 6 November 2014 (Netherlands)
- Running time: 85 minutes
- Countries: Netherlands; Belgium
- Languages: Dutch; Flemish

Violet is a 2014 coming-of-age drama film written and directed by Bas Devos in his feature directorial debut. Starring Cesar De Sutter, Koen De Sutter, Mira Helmer, and Raf Walschaerts, the film follows Jesse, a 15-year-old boy who witnesses his best friend Jonas stabbed to death at a shopping mall and must tell his family and friends what happened.

An international co-production between the Netherlands and Belgium, Violet premiered at the 64th Berlin International Film Festival on 12 February 2014, where Devos was nominated for Best First Feature. The film was theatrically released in the Netherlands on 6 November 2014 to critical acclaim.

== Plot ==
The film follows the actions of 15-year-old Jesse, after witnessing a violent act against his friend.

== Cast ==
- César De Sutter - Jesse
- Koen De Sutter
- Mira Helmer - Marie
- Raf Walschaerts - Walte

== Release ==
Violet was released in 2014 at the Berlin International Film Festival.

== Reception ==
On the review aggregator website Rotten Tomatoes, 85% of 20 critics' reviews are positive. Metacritic, which uses a weighted average, assigned the film a score of 77 out of 100, based on 6 critics, indicating "generally favorable" reviews.

Nikola Grozdanovic, in his review for IndieWire wrote that "this is an exquisitely shot suburban tale of trauma, stretching the 'show-don't-tell' golden rule of filmmaking to the furthest reaches." For Variety, Ronnie Scheib called the film a "visually stylized, highly original depiction of a teen's stages of grief."

== Accolades ==
The film won the Georges Delerue Award for Best Soundtrack/Sound Design at Film Fest Gent in 2014.
