= Parem =

Tajik folk-rock band, formed in 1993

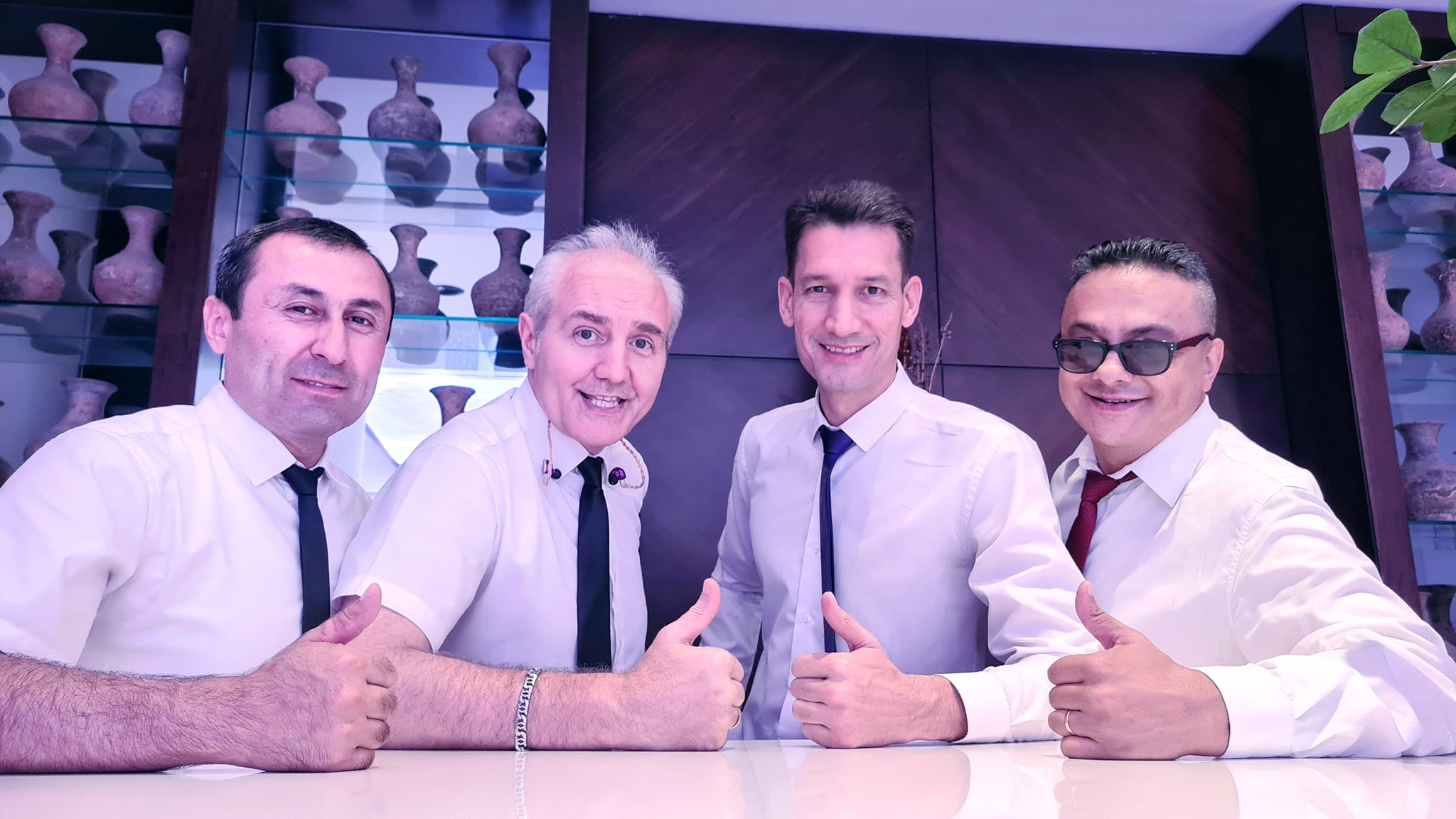
- The «Parem» in 2022; from left to right: Shavkat Mullojonov, Olim Shirinov, Sobir Aminov, Feyruz Khakimov

Background information
- Origin: Dushanbe, Tajikistan
- Genre: Rock, Folk-rock, Pop-Rock
- Years active: 1993–present
- Label: JC Records Studio
- Members: Olim Shirinov; Sobir Aminov; Feyruz Hakimov; Shavkat Mullojonov
- Past members: Nargis Muminova; Vladislav Nechipurenko; Maksud Tairov; Nodir Sharipov; Evgeniy Tengizbaev; Alisher Sayfulloev; Farrukh Hudoyberdyev; Hakimdzhon Hazratkulov; Sulton Imonov; Daler Sultonov; Alisher Zarikov.
- Website: www.facebook.com/paremgroup

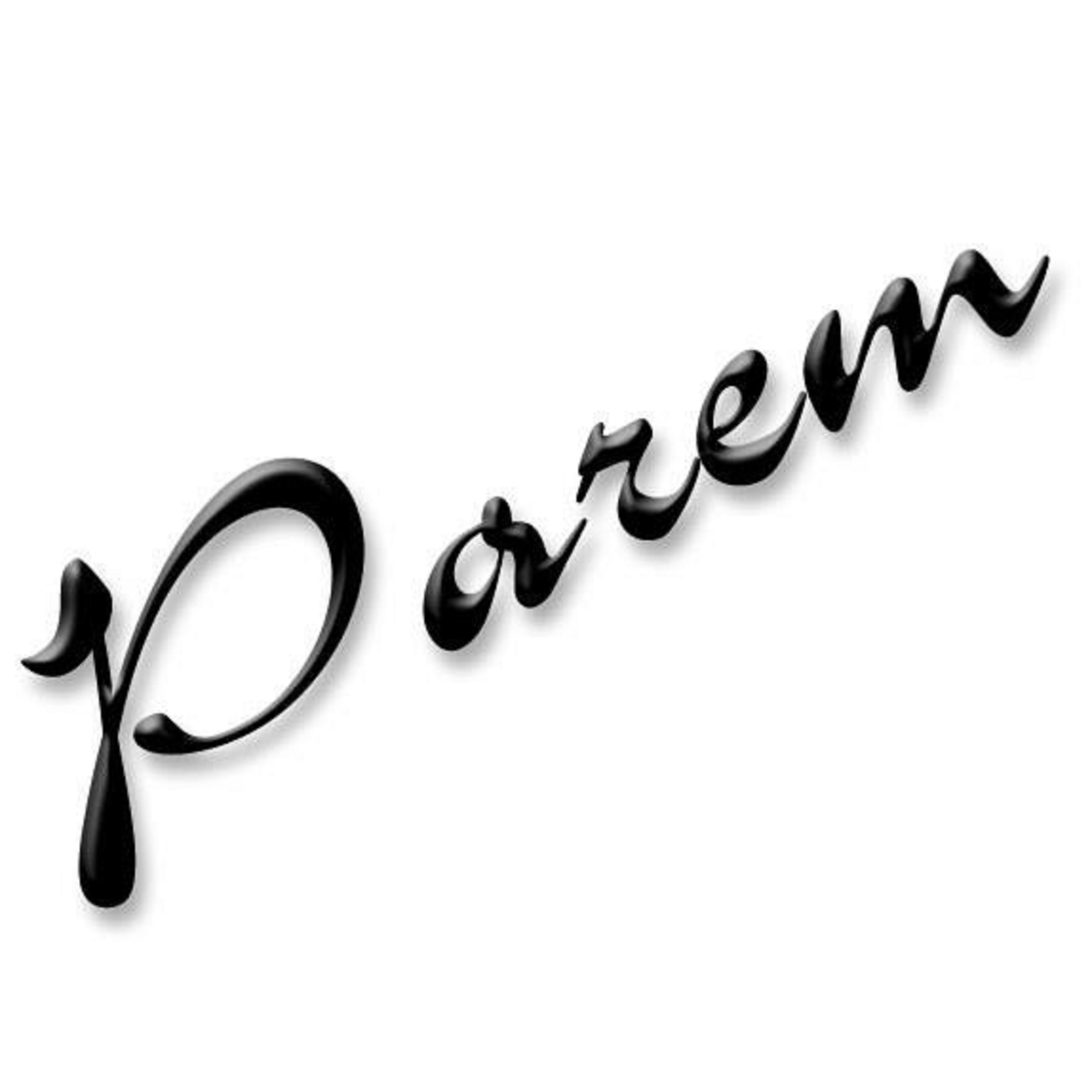
Parem band logo

«Parem» (Tajik: Парем) is a Tajik folk-rock band, formed in 1993, based on the vocal instrumental ensemble «Boychechak», at the House of Pioneers of Frunzensky district of Dushanbe city.

== History ==
The «Parem» band was formed in March 1993 by Vladimir Yumatov, Olim Shirinov, Feyruz Hakimov and Alisher Zarikov. The name of the band was given by Olim Shirinov, who suggested that the group be called "Parem", during the discussion of various options for the name of the group.
The first composition of the band was consisted of:

- Vladimir Yumatov - vocals, drums
- Olim Shirinov - vocals, bass guitar
- Feyruz Hakimov - vocals, rhythm guitar
- Alisher Zarikov - lead guitar
- Vladislav Nechipurenko - keyboards
- Nargis Muminova - vocals

The band «Parem» gave their first concerts in the midst of the Civil War in Tajikistan. These were home concerts and performances at schools and small clubs in the city of Dushanbe.

In May 1993, Olim Shirinov left the band due to a conflict with Vladimir Yumatov and led the beat band «Kamchatka», Maksud Tairov took the place of bass guitar player, an old friend of the band who had played in «Boychechak».

In June 1993, Feyruz Hakimov and Vladislav Nechipurenko left «Parem» and at the suggestion of Olim Shirinov joined the «Kamchatka» band. Alisher Sayfulloev took the place of Feyruz Hakimov in the band «Parem».

From the spring of 1993 to 1995, the band «Parem» periodically performed at “Rock Panoramas”, performing songs in Russian that were sung by Vladimir Yumatov.

In 1994, Nargis Muminova left the band. She lives in Germany now.

1995 became a turning point for the future of the band, the first songs in the Tajik language began to appear in the «Parem»'s repertoire, that Alisher Sayfulloev began to compose and sing.

In early 1995, Vladimir Yumatov left the band, and Olim Shirinov, who returned to the band, took his place as a leader and music producer. The band radically changes the style, abandoning the use of keyboards and choosing rock and roll and folk-rock as the main style.

In the spring of 1995, Sobir Aminov joined the band as rhythm guitarist.

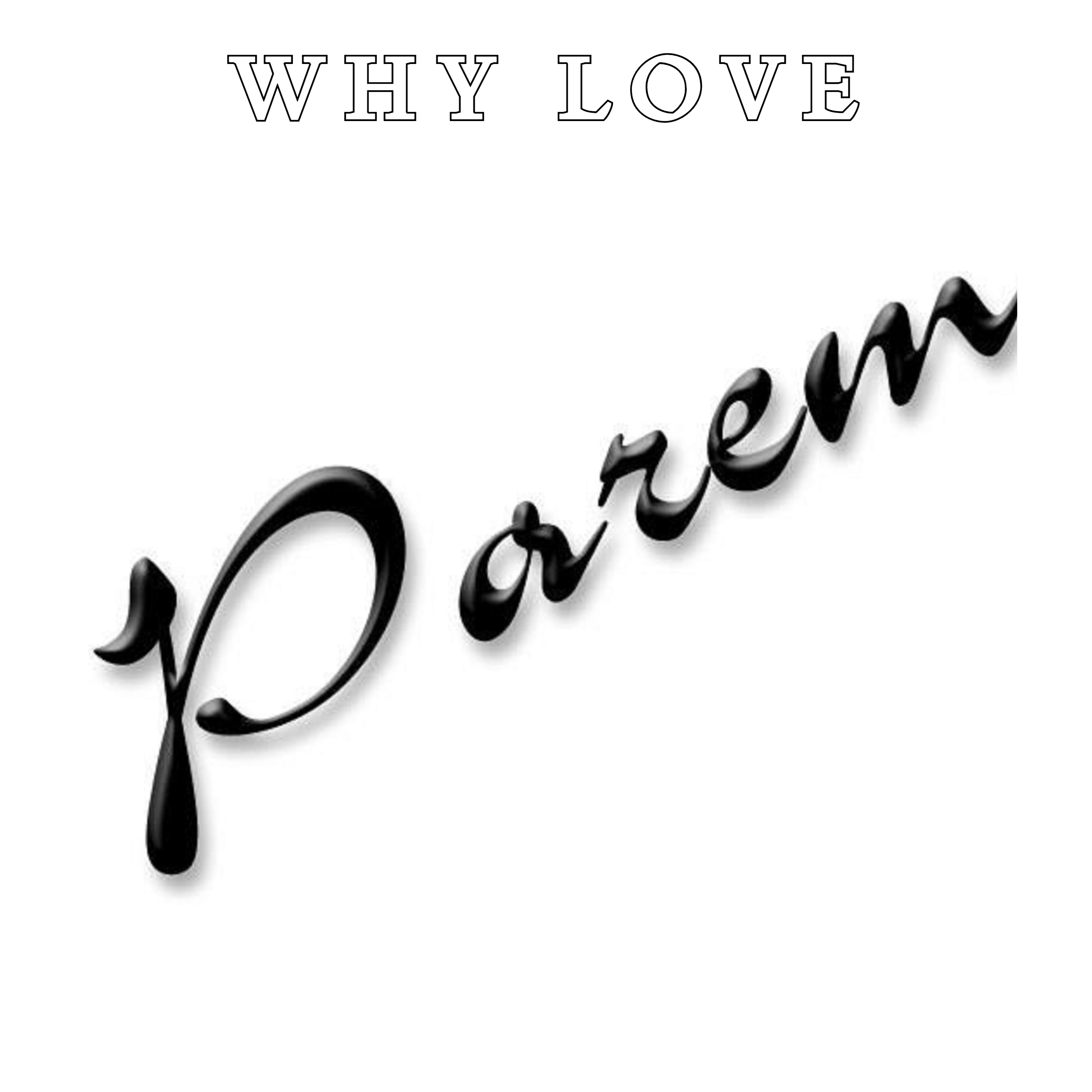
Album cover «Why Love» (Ay charo ishq)

In May 1996, the band «Parem» recorded their first album - «Why Love» (Tajik: Ай чаро ишқ).

The following took part in the recording of the album: Band «Parem»:

- Alisher Sayfulloev - vocals, rhythm guitar
- Olim Shirinov - vocals, drums, clave, music producer
- Alisher Zarikov - lead guitar
- Maksud Tairov - bass guitar
- Sobir Aminov - rhythm guitar

Recording staff:

- Zurab Kokoev — sound engineer
- Vladimir Yumatov - programming drum parts

In addition to the original songs of the band «Parem», the album included 2 songs of «The Beatles» - Things We Said Today and The Long and Winding Road. The songs of «The Beatles» have been an integral part of all the performances of the band «Parem» since its formation, for which the musicians are often called as «Dushanbe Beatles».

The presentation of the album took place on 15 June 1996 at the Russian Drama Theater named by V. Mayakovsky.

In 1996, Maksud Tairov left the band, moving to Uzbekistan for permanent residence and Sobir Aminov became the bass-guitar player of the band.

1997, the band «Parem» recorded the song «Medoni yo ne». The song quickly became popular among youth and students. According to the fans of the band «Medoni yo ne» is the visit card of the band «Parem».

In December 1998, Alisher Sayfulloev left the band. Khakimjon Khazratkulov took his place as a rhythm guitarist, and Sobir Aminov becomes the main singer of the band «Parem».

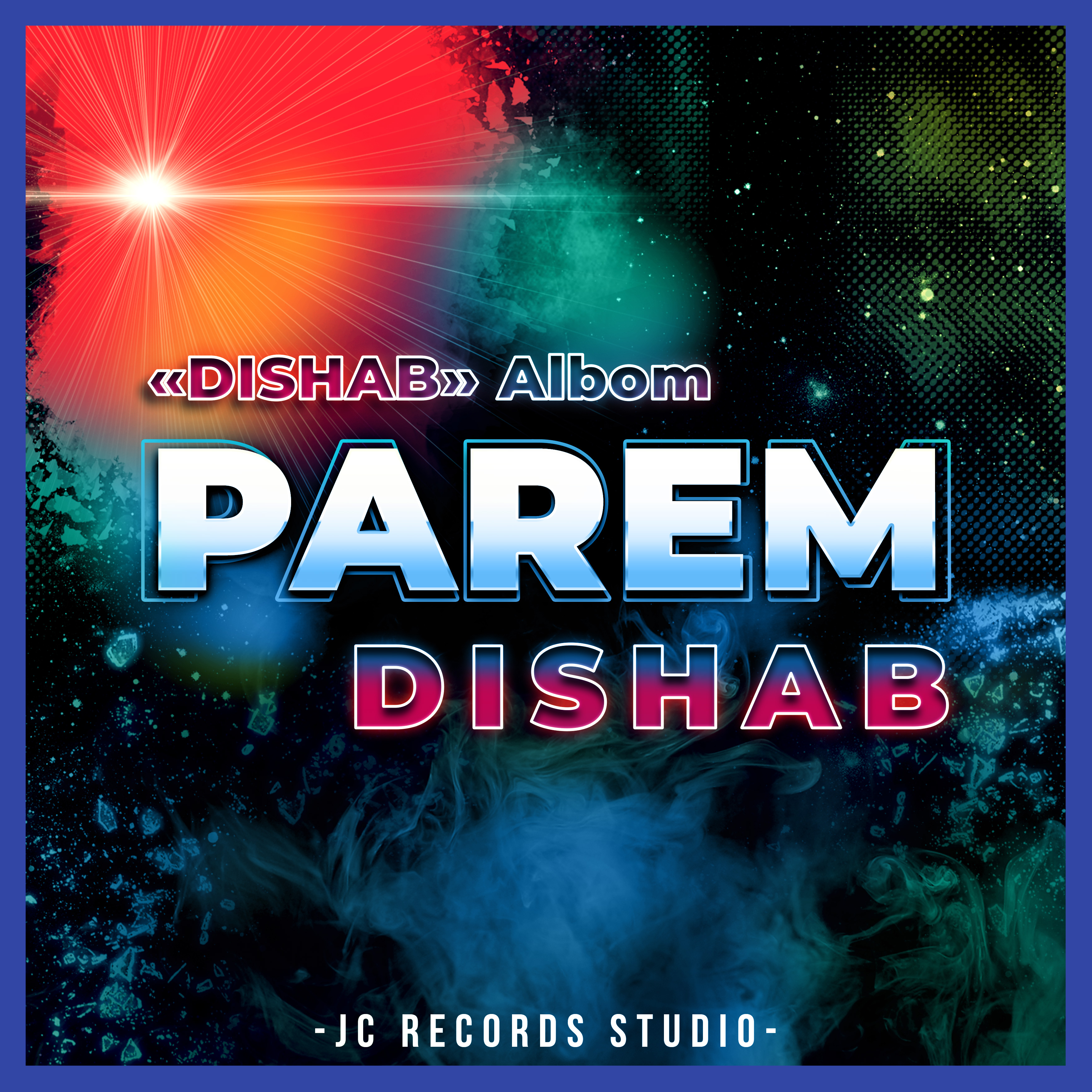
Album cover «Dishab»

At the end of 1999, the band's second album, «Dishab», was released. All songs on this album were written by Sobir Aminov.

The album «Dishab» was recorded at the State Studio «Radio House» of the Republic of Tajikistan in the following composition:

- Sobir Aminov - vocals, bass guitar
- Olim Shirinov - drums, backing vocals, music producer
- Alisher Zarikov - lead guitar
- Khakimjon Khazratkulov - rhythm guitar

Session Musician:

- Zarif Pulodov — percussion

Sound engineer: Vladimir Shlykov The presentation of the album «Dishab» took place on 4 and 5 December 1999 on the stage of the Cinema-Concert Hall named by Borbad (Tajik: «Кохи Борбад»).

In 2000, very young Daler Sultonov joined the band, first as a percussionist, and then as a guitarist and vocalist.

In September 2001, the «Parem» band together with the «Farzin» band leaves for Germany, where the musicians gave a joint concert in the city of Giessen.

In 2004, the percussionist Farrukh Khudoyberdyev joined the band.

On 24 July 2011, «Parem» made a first performance in Moscow city, on the stage of the capital club Б2.

The day after the concert, the anchorpersons of the morning show of the state radio station Mayak – “Stillavin and his friends” - Sergei Stillavin and Rustam Vakhidov, having criticized the performance of the «Parem» band, moved from discussing the band's repertoire to direct insults on ethnic grounds, which caused a great resonance in the Russian, Tajik and European press.

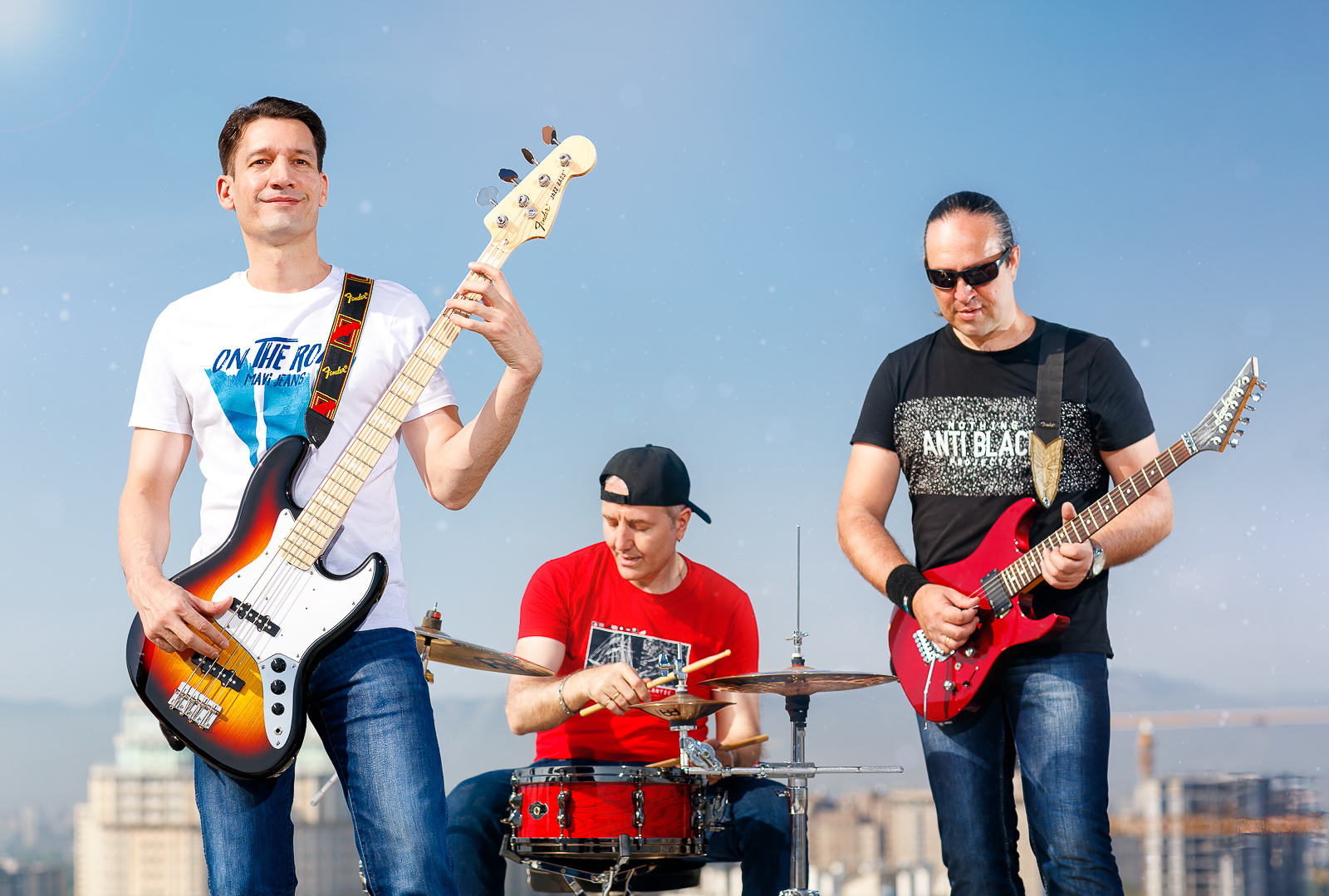
Группа «Парем» 2021 год

On August 24, 2011, the hosts of Mayak radio, Sergei Stillavin and Rustam Vakhidov, apologized to the «Parem» group.

In 2012, Farrukh Khudoyberdyev left the band and was replaced by percussionist Shavkat Mullodzhonov, who mainly plays the doira.

In September 2012, the «Parem» band again had a tour to the Russian Federation, where they held series of concerts in Moscow and the Moscow region.

On Monday, 29 April 2013, in the city clinical hospital of Dushanbe, after a short illness, Khakimjon Khazratkulov the guitarist of the «Parem» band died. In July 2013, the attending physician of Khakimjon Khazratkulov was taken into custody.

In the summer of 2013, Khakim's place in the band was taken by Sulton Imomov, who had previously played in the “Shabdez” band.

On June 6, 2022, Alisher Zarikov decided to leave Parem, the group informed fans about this on their Facebook and Instagram pages.

In June 2022, Feyruz Hakimov becomes the solo guitarist of the «Parem» group.

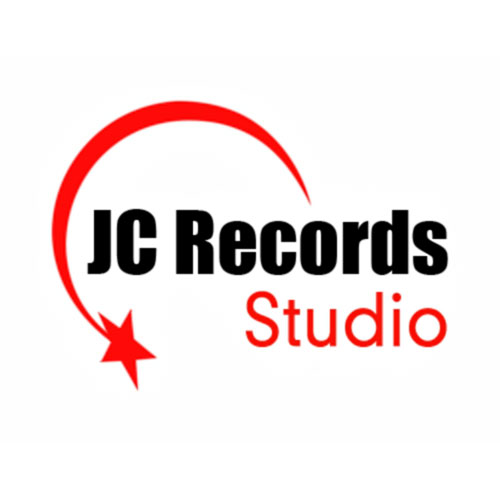
«JC Records Studio»	Since December 1999, the «Parem» group has been recording all their songs at the «JC Records Studio» the sound engineer and owner of which is Olim Shirinov.

== Members ==
=== Current members ===
- Olim Shakarmamadov - drums, vocals, music producer
- Sobir Aminov - bass guitar, vocals, guitar
- Feyruz Hakimov — lead guitar, stringed instruments
- Shavkat Mullojonov - doira

=== Former members ===
- Nargis Muminova — vocals (1993–1994);
- Vladislav Nechipurenko — keyboards (1993);
- Vladimir Youmatov — drums, vocal (1993–1995);
- Maksud Tairov — bass guitar (1993–1996);
- Nodir Sharipov — tavlak (1996–1998);
- Evgeny Tengizbaev — clarinet (1997–1998);
- Alisher Sayfulloev — vocals, guitar (1994–1998), (2007–2014);
- Farrukh Khudoyberdyev — percussion (2005–2012);
- Khakimjon Khazratkulov — rhythm guitar, acoustic guitar (1999–2013);
- Sulton Imomov — rhythm guitar (2013–2017);
- Daler Sultonov — percussion, tabla (2001–2005), guitar, acoustic guitar, vocals, guitar (2013–2019);
- Alisher Zarikov - lead guitar, guitar.

== Awards ==
- On 31 January 1998, the «Parem» band became a Diploma-recipient of the «SONE» Prize, established by the «MIR» TV and Radio Broadcasting Company, in the nomination of «Best Debut of the Year».
- On 19 December 1999, the «Parem» band became an awardee of the competition «Melodies of the Past Century» organized by the «Open Society» Institute - Assistance Foundation, in the nomination «Nostalgia».
- On 15 May 2004, the band «Parem» with the song «Tanho dar yod» became an awardee of the competition «Song of the Year 2004» (Tajik: Суруди Сол 2004), organized by the TV and Radio Broadcasting Company «Asia-Plus».
- On 21 May 2005, the band «Parem» with the song «Ay gulak» became an awardee of the competition «Song of the Year 2005» (Tajik: Суруди Сол 2005), organized by the TV and Radio Broadcasting Company «Asia-Plus».
- In 2016, the band «Parem» with the song «Alo Gul» became an awardee of the competition «Song of the Year 2016» (Tajik: Суруди Сол 2016), organized by the Holding Company “Orieno-Media» with the support of the Ministry of Culture of the Republic of Tajikistan.
- On 21 December 2021, the band «Parem» with the song «Oshiqi zoram» became an awardee of the competition «Tarona Music Award 2021» (Tajik: Ҷоизаи мусиқавии Tarona — 2021), organized by the TV and Radio Broadcasting Company «Asia-Plus».

== Albums ==
Why Love (Ay charo ishq) — 1996
No.	Title	Lyrics	Music	Length
1.	"Bar diyori man"	Alisher Sayfulloev	Alisher Sayfulloev	3:02
2.	"Things We Said Today"	John Lennon & Paul McCartney	John Lennon & Paul McCartney	2:52
3.	"Ay charo ishq"	Alisher Sayfulloev	Alisher Sayfulloev	3:14
4.	"Na taiushchem nebe"	Olim Shirinov	Olim Shirinov	3:10
5.	"Obi ravon"	Alisher Sayfulloev	Alisher Sayfulloev	3:35
6.	"Mavji daryo"	Unknown	Alisher Sayfulloev	3:15
7.	"The Long And Winding Road"	John Lennon & Paul McCartney	John Lennon & Paul McCartney	3:16
8.	"Surudi dili man"	Alisher Sayfulloev	Alisher Sayfulloev	3:06
9.	"Noma"	Alisher Sayfulloev	Alisher Sayfulloev	4:29
10.	"Sitorai man"	Sobir Aminov	Sobir Aminov	3:36
11.	"More Than Words"	Gary Cherone & Nuno Bettencourt	Gary Cherone & Nuno Bettencourt	4:19
12.	"Nigoro"	folks	folks	3:46
13.	"Bevafo"	«Parem»	Olim Shirinov	1:50
14.	"Osen`"	Olim Shirinov	Olim Shirinov	2:44

Dishab — 1999.
No.	Title	Lyrics	Music	Length
1.	"Dishab"	Sobir Aminov	Sobir Aminov	3:50
2.	"Sarvinoz"	Sobir Aminov	Sobir Aminov	3:17
3.	"Layli"	Sobir Aminov	Sobir Aminov	2:54
4.	"Gul be rukhi yor"	Hofiz Sherozi	Sobir Aminov	3:27
5.	"Mahinamoh"	Sobir Aminov	Sobir Aminov	2:54
6.	"Tu kujo"	Sobir Aminov	Sobir Aminov	2:35
7.	"Tanho dar yod"	Sobir Aminov	Sobir Aminov	3:36
8.	"Algiyos"	Hofiz Sherozi	Sobir Aminov	3:22
9.	"Jonam"	Sobir Aminov	Sobir Aminov	4:29
10.	"Biyo imshab"	Sobir Aminov	Sobir Aminov	3:32

== Singles ==
Year	Name	Music	Lyrics
1996	Guli man	Alisher Sayfulloev	Alisher Sayfulloev
1996	Medoni yo ne	Sobir Aminov	Alisher Sayfulloev
1997	Laylo	Alisher Sayfulloev	Alisher Sayfulloev
1997	Ba Hudo	Alisher Sayfulloev	Alisher Sayfulloev
1997	To ba kay suzam	unknown Mlazian band	Alisher Sayfulloev
1997	Dar yodi man	Alisher Sayfulloev	Alisher Sayfulloev
1998	Omadast	Alisher Sayfulloev	Alisher Sayfulloev
1999	Baby It's You	Luther Dixon	Burt Bacharach
2001	Twist & Shout	Phil Medley & Bert Berns	Phil Medley & Bert Berns
2001	Mohi tobon	Sobir Aminov	Sobir Aminov
2003	Tanho dar yod («Parem» feat. Dilnoza Akramova)	Sobir Aminov	Sobir Aminov
2004	Ay gulak	Sobir Aminov	Sobir Aminov
2006	O, Layli	Sobir Aminov	Sobir Aminov
2006	Yori man	Daler Sultonov	Daler Sultonov
2010	Nigoram	Sobir Aminov	Sobir Aminov
2011	Jonona baro ba raqs	Sobir Aminov	Sobir Aminov
2011	Biyo biyo jonona	Alisher Sayfulloev	Alisher Sayfulloev
2012	Ay bodi sabo	Alisher Sayfulloev	Alisher Sayfulloev
2018	Mayozor	Sobir Aminov	Sobir Aminov
2019	Dar Dilum	Sobir Aminov	Sobir Aminov
2021	Naru naru	Sobir Aminov	Sobir Aminov

== Links ==
- ISNI ID «Parem»
- Official Youtube channel of the «Parem» group
- The official Instagram channel of the «Parem» group
- «Parem» Page on Apple Music
- «Parem» Page on Yandex Music
- Link to the archive page of the old official site of the «Parem» group (Wikipedia Archive)
