= Jurabek Murodov =

Jurabek Murodov Ҷӯрабек Муродов
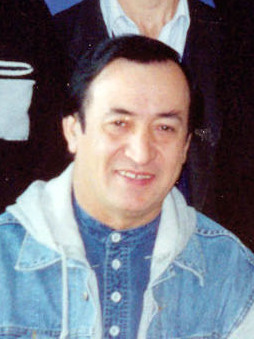

Background information
- Born: 24 December 1942 (age 83)
- Origin: Kurud village Ayni, Tajik SSR, USSR
- Genres: Traditional Tajik music, Shashmaqom
- Occupations: Singer, songwriter, composer
- Instruments: Rubob, tor
- Years active: 1962 to present
- Label: JM Production
- Website: www.jmc.tj

Jurabek Murodov (sometimes spelled Jurabek Muradov) (Tajik: Ҷӯрабек Муродов, Russian: Джурабек Муродов) is a Tajik singer and songwriter. He is a People's Artist of Tajikistan and People's Artist of USSR (1979).

== Life ==
Jurabek Murodov's son Jonibek Murodov is also a popular singer.

== Track list ==
#	Song	Length
01	"Zulaykho"	
02	"Zaboni nay"	
03	"Vatan"	
04	"Valsi Jurabek"	
05	"Sanam"	
06	"Safar kardam"	
07	"Ruzi navmedi"	
08	"Padarjonam"	
09	"Padarjon"	
10	"Nomi Khudo"	
11	"Munojot"	
12	"Mo dar du jahon"	
13	"Mehri modar"	
14	"Mehri Khudo"	
15	"Qadrnashinosi"	
16	"Guzashti ruzgor"	
17	"Girya"	
18	"Ghalat"	
19	"Dili modar"	
20	"Dar yak jo"	
21	"Dardi millat"	
22	"Bongi jashni Tojikon"	
23	"Bedor kun Khudoyo"	
24	"Modar"	
