= Zafar Nozim =

Tajikistani musician (1940–2010)

Zafar Nozim (Tajik: Зафар Нозим, Russian: Зафар Нозим; 2 June 1940 – 3 August 2010) was a folk singer from Tajikistan. He was a popular performer of Tajik national songs. He was known as the "Tajik Pavarotti".

Nozim was born in the Rasht Valley in Central Tajikistan, and first came to public attention in the early 1960s. He sang songs based on classical Tajik literature, and was also a composer. He was named Honored Artist of Tajikistan in 1964, People's Artist of Tajikistan in 1972, and Laureate of the State. In 2009, he was awarded a Sitorai Prezidenti Tojikiston (Star of the President of Tajikistan). He died in Dushanbe after a long illness, including suffering a stroke.
