= Oleg Fesov =

Oleg Fezov
- Born: May 2, 1963 (age 63)
- Origin: (Tajik Soviet Socialist Republic) Khorugh, Shughnon District of Gorno-Badakhshan Autonomous Region, Tajikistan Soviet Socialist Republic
- Genres: pop, folk rock,
- Instruments: Guitar, Ud, Sitar, Tabla, Keyboard

Oleg Fezov, or Oleg Fesov (Tajik: Олег Фезов) is a musician, and composer from Tajikistan, who composes and arranges his songs in addition to performing. In 1990 he graduated from Dushanbe College of Arts where he majored in sculpture. Later he decided to switch fields and soon enough he was one of the best illustrating artists of children's periodic and used to be the art director of "Mash Ap" children's magazine.

But his natural talent for music soon overpowered his love for graphic art. He used to play violin as a kid and since then he always had passion for music. This allowed him to simultaneously develop a musical career. He first started to compose and arrange music and later performing his own songs and music. He now lives in Germany. Despite living as an immigrant, Fesov still feels strongly connected to his home country and his ancestors from the Pamir Mountains. His people are Badakhshani, or Pamiri, an ethnic group of some 350,000 people who are divided by the Afghanistan-Tajikistan border. Fesov had to leave his home country because of the Civil War of Tajikistan that raged on during the 1990s. After taking his wife actress Lola Tayngushoeva and their two kids away from the raging war, Oleg returned to Dushanbe, lived on his mother's pension and played with band on weddings. Soon after a wave of murders occurred in Dushanbe forcing Oleg to return to Moscow.

The album Lalaiki Pamir presents the musical traditions and ideas of Badakhshan (Tajikistan) and the Pamir Mountains. The traditional oriental string and percussion instruments such as sitar, rubab, ud, dombra, various drums and tablas, play an important role in the music of Oleg Fesov combined with his intensive and emotion-loaded voice. All lyrics are in Tajik or Pamirian language Rushani and shughni languages.

Oleg Fesov was discovered at the huge "Voice of Asia" festival in Alma Ata, Kazakhstan where he and his band Darvish received a special prize and Nargis Bandishoeva who performed one of his songs won the contest. His international exposure came when German label Blue Flame released a series of recordings with the top performers that participated in that festival. American audiences found out about Oleg Fesov in 1995, when one of his songs, Marav, was included in the three-CD world fusion boxed set titled Planet Soup (Ellipsis Arts CD 3450), released by Ellipsis Arts and produced by Angel Romero.
