= Georges Delerue Award =

Film score award

The Georges Delerue Award for Best Music, or Georges Delerue Prize / Prix Georges Delerue, is an award for the best film score. It is named after the French composer Georges Delerue, and was first awarded at the 1985 Film Fest Gent festival. Past winners include: Benny Andersson, Ry Cooder, Bruno Coulais, Jean-Luc Godard, Michael Kamen, Astor Piazzolla, Rachel Portman, Howard Shore, Toru Takemitsu, and Vangelis.

== Awards ==
Each year, two prizes are awarded of €10,000 and €15,000. Winners are sometimes declared using the following categories:

- Best Musical Documentary (shortened to 'BMD' in the table below)
- Best Use of Existing Music (shortened to 'BUEM' in the table below)
- Best Original Music (shortened to 'BOM' in the table below)
- Best Application of Music (shortened to 'BAM' in the table below)
- Best Use of Music in Film (shortened to 'BUMF' in the table below)

== Award winners ==
Year	Award	Winner(s)	Nationality of Winner(s) (At Time of Award)	Film	Ref.
1985	BMD	Daniel Schmid	Switzerland	Tosca's Kiss (Il bacio di Tosca)	
1985	BUEM	Jean-Luc Godard	France	Détective	
1986	BOM	Ry Cooder	United States	Crossroads	
1986	BAM	Pirjo Honkasalo, Pekka Lehto	Finland	Da Capo	
1987	Winner	Benoît Lamy	Belgium	Life Is Beautiful	
1988	Winner	Astor Piazzolla	Argentina	Sur	
1989	Winner	Tôru Takemitsu	Japan	Black Rain	
1989	BUMF	Michael Haneke	Austria	The Seventh Continent	
1990	Winner	Michael Kamen	United States	The Krays	
1991	Winner	Rachid Bouchareb	Algeria	Cheb	
1992	Winner	David Robbins	United States	Bob Roberts	
1993	Winner	Hou Hsiao-hsien	Taiwan	The Puppetmaster	
1994	Winner	Frédéric Devreese	Belgium	La Partie d'échecs	
1995	Winner	Tôn-Thất Tiết	France	Cyclo	
1996	Winner	Bruno Coulais	France	Microcosmos	
1997	Winner	Vangelis	Greece	Kavafis	
1998	Winner	Simon Fisher Turner	United Kingdom	Claire Dolan	
1999	Winner	Rachel Portman	United Kingdom	Ratcatcher	
2000	Winner	Tan Dun	China	Crouching Tiger, Hidden Dragon	
2001	Winner	Vladimír Godár	Slovakia	Landscape	
2002	Winner	Howard Shore	Canada	Spider	
2003	Winner	Zygmunt Konieczny	Poland	Pornografia	
2004	Winner	Miguel Miranda, José Tobar	Chile	Machuca	
2005	Winner	Stephen Warbeck	United Kingdom	Proof	
2006	Winner	Tony Gatlif, Delphine Mantoulet	France	Transylvania	
2007	Winner	Benny Andersson	Sweden	You, the Living	
2008	Winner	Tolib Shakhidi	Tajikistan	Two-legged Horse	
2009	Winner	Nathan Larson	United States	A Rational Solution	
2010	Winner	Hong-jip Kim	South Korea	The Housemaid	
2011	Winners	Evgueni & Sacha Galperine	Russia	The Invader	
2012	Winner	Olivier Assayas	France	Something in the Air	
2013	Winner	Lim Giong	Taiwan	A Touch of Sin	
2014	Winner	Boris Debackere	Belgium	Violet	
2015	Winner	Johnnie Burn	United Kingdom	The Lobster	
2016	Winner	Johnny Jewel	United States	Home	
2017	Winner	Dan Romer	United States	A Ciambra	
2018	Winner	Stuart A. Staples	United Kingdom	High Life	
2019	Winners	Mica Levi (soundtrack) and Lena Esquenazi (sound design)	United Kingdom, Cuba	Monos	
2020	Winners	Cristian Lolea & Miroslav Toth (soundtrack)	Romania, Slovakia	Servants	
2021	Winner	Ruben De Gheselle (soundtrack)	Belgium	Clara Sola	
2022	Winners	Tobias Koch & Jannik Giger (soundtrack)	Switzerland	Drii Winter	
2023	Winner	Jerskin Fendrix (score)	United Kingdom	Poor Things	
2024	Winner	Miguel Gomes	Portugal	Grand Tour	
2025	Winner	Stillz, Arca (score)	Colombia United States	Barrio Triste	
