= Feruza Jumaniyozova =

Uzbek pop singer (born 1984)

Feruza
- Born: Feruza Jumaniyozova; 1984 (age 40–41); Khorezm Province, Uzbekistan
- Origin: Uzbekistan
- Genres: Traditional
- Years active: 2005–2019

Feruza Jumaniyozova (Uzbek: Феруза Жуманиёзова, Феруза Джуманиязова) is an Uzbek pop singer who sings in Uzbek and Tajik. She was born in 1984 in Khorezm province of Uzbekistan. Some of her top songs are "Vaexo", "Yalla Habibi", "Yurak Duk Duk" and "Kel Azizim". She got married in October 2010.

== Filmography ==
=== Actress ===
Film
Year	Film	Role	Notes
2006	Voy dod sumalak	Herself	Musical

=== Music videos ===
Year	Title	Director
	«Sahro»	
	«Nayladi ishqing mani»	
	«Shaxmati bor»	
	«Diydor»	
	«Ko'zingizda»	
	«Yalla habibi»	
	«Ra'no»	
	«Sen shohida, men bargida»	
	«Galmadi»	
	«Kel azizim»	
	«Zang-zang»	
	«Vaeho»	
	«Kuydirding» (feat. Asilbek Negmatov)	
	«Ko'zlaring»	
	«Amigo»	
	«Kumushning ko'zi manda»	
	«Chak-chak»	
	«Qo'rqaman»	
	«Xeyli ax ax»	
	«Yurak duk duk»	
	«Alvido»	
	«Chirtaman»	
	«Ignadan ip o'tmasa»	
