= Noziya Karomatullo =

Tajik singer (born 1988)

Noziya Karomatullo Нозияи Кароматулло
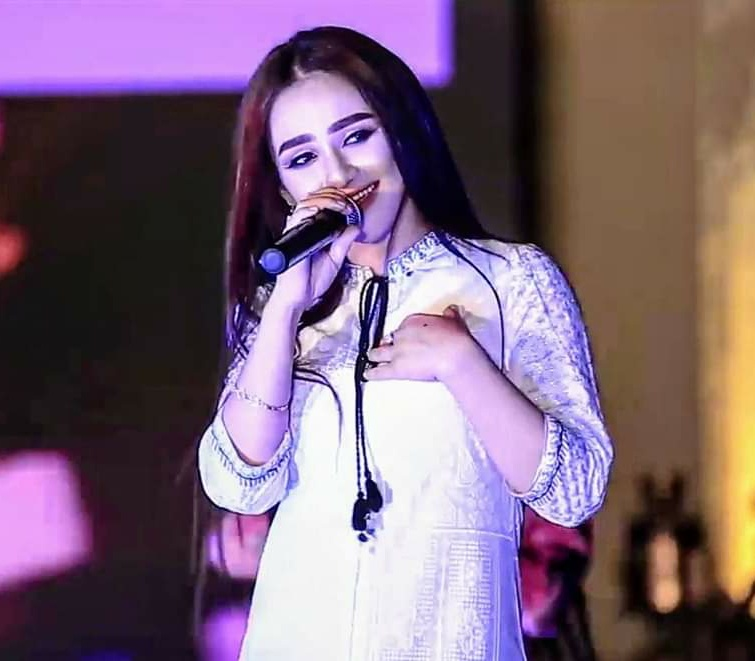

Background information
- Born: 7 February 1988 (age 38); Dushanbe, Tajik SSR
- Genres: Ghazal; Classical; Pop; Film; Various
- Occupation: Singer
- Instruments: Tabla, Piano, Violin
- Years active: 2010 – present
- Label: Various

Noziya Karomatullo (Tajik: Нозияи Кароматулло; born 7 February 1988) is a Tajikistani singer. Nozia sings mostly in Tajik, however she also sings in Hindi and Persian. She performs in concerts, New-Year Parties, National Day Parades, Radio and TV Programs in her native Tajikistan as well as other neighboring countries like Iran, India etc.

== Early life ==
Noziya Karomatullo was born 7 February 1988 in Dushanbe, Tajikistan, then part of the Soviet Union. She is the daughter of a famous Tajik singer Karomatullo Qurbonov. Her father, Karomatullo Qurbonov, died on 17 October 1992 in an attack by bandits during the civil war in the Yavan district, while returning from a wedding party at night.

== Education ==
Noziya graduated in 2005 from Maliki Sobirova and entered the conservatory in New Delhi for the academic diploma course in classical singing and dancing.

In 2010 she graduated from the Indian Conservatory with honors, and in the same year performed her first solo concert.

Noziya Karomatullo is now a 5th-year student of the Institute of Entrepreneurship and Service, Faculty of International Relations.

== Personal life ==
She got married in the year 2014 and gave birth to a girl on 7 December 2015.

== Achievements ==
In 2007, she won the competition of classical dance kathak in India.
