= Farid Zoland =

Afghan songwriter, record producer, music executive

Farid Zoland فرید زلاند
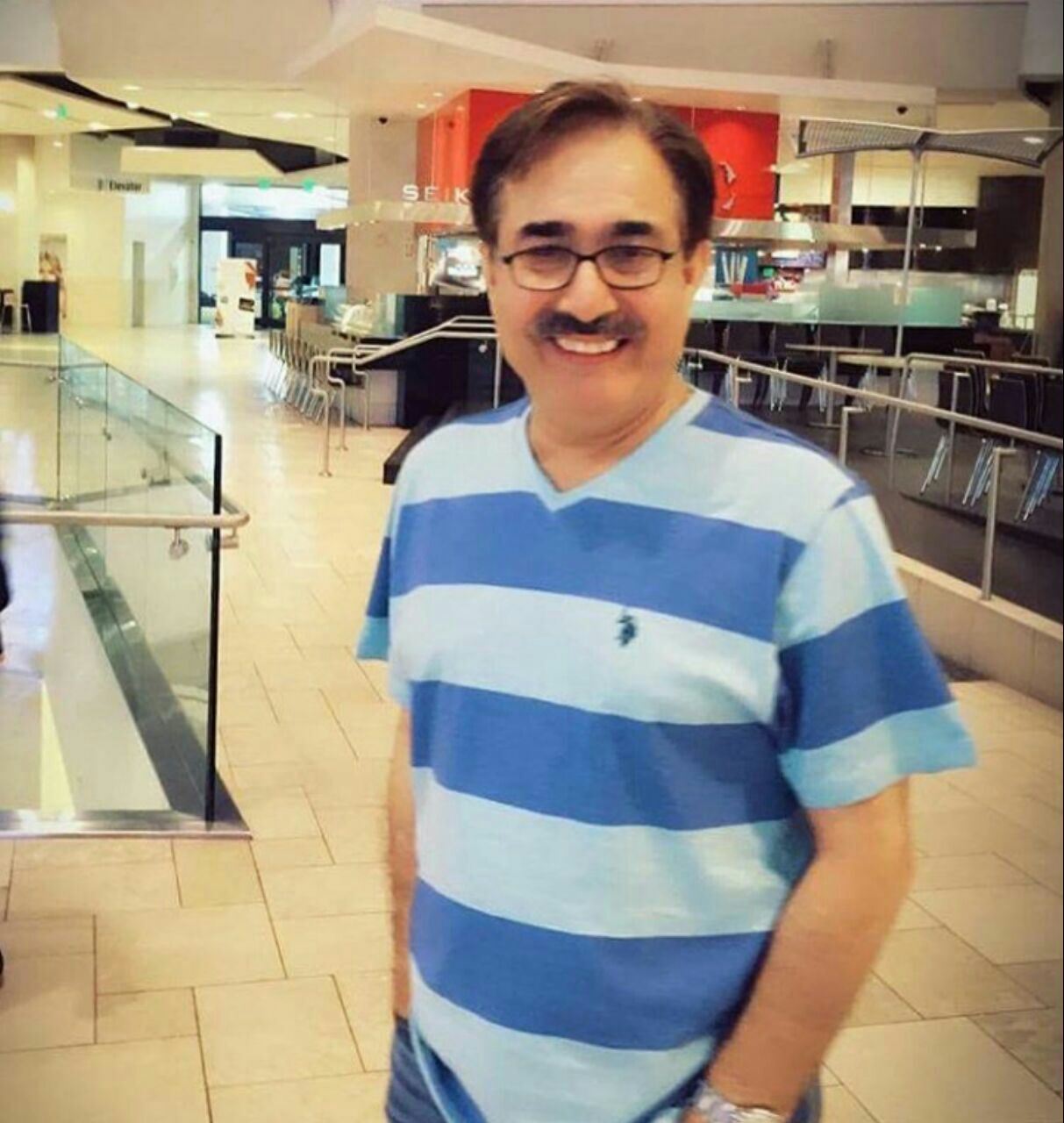
- Farid Zoland

Background information
- Born: Farid Zoland; 31 July 1949 (age 77); Kabul, Kingdom of Afghanistan
- Origin: Kabul, Kingdom of Afghanistan
- Genres: Pop, classical
- Occupations: record producer, songwriter, composer
- Instruments: Guitar, Piano, Tabla, Rubab
- Years active: 1971-present

Farid Zoland (Persian: فرید زلاند, alsoZaland, born 31 July 1949 in Kabul, Kingdom of Afghanistan) is an Tajik songwriter and composer. He has collaborated with many musicians from other countries, most notably from Iran.

== Early life ==
He comes from a family of musicians with father Jalil Zaland and siblings Shahla Zaland and Wahid Zaland.

== Education ==
After receiving preliminary education in music from his father in Kabul, Zaland received formal education in music at the University of Tehran. He studied music score, theory, and composition at the University of Southern California from 1980 to 1982.

== Career ==
Zoland went on to compose and produce many of the most iconic Iranian songs for major artists like Dariush, Ebi, Googoosh, Hayedeh, Shahrokh and Moein. He has also collaborated with American musicians, namely Lloyd Miller.

He has also had minor acting roles.
