= Soheila Zaland =

Persian: سُهَيلا ځلاند Sohaila Zaland
- Born: Sohaila Zaland (سُهَيلا ځلاند); Afghanistan
- Genres: Pop; Classical Music
- Occupation: Singer
- Years active: 1980–present
- Label: Various

Sohaila Zaland (FARSI:سُهَيلا ځلاند) is an Afghan popular singer. She is the daughter of singer and composer Ustad Zaland and sister of composer Farid Zaland and singers Shahla Zaland and Wahid Zaland.

== Personal life ==
Sohaila is married to an Iranian-American. Her song Waqti Ashiq Shawi (When you fall in love) has been sung by many Iranian singers, notably Hayedeh. In one of her interviews on Afghan diaspora TV network, she talked about her family's disapproval of her singing. In recent years, she has kept a low profile.
