= Ziyodullo Shahidi =

Ziyodullo Shahidi Зиёдулло Шаҳидӣ
- Born: Ziyodullo Muqaddasovich Shahidi; Зиёдулло Муқаддасович Шаҳидӣ; May 4, 1914; Samarkand, Russian Empire
- Origin: Russian Empire → Tajik SSR
- Died: February 25, 1985 (aged 70) Dushanbe, Tajik SSR, USSR
- Occupations: Composer; Film composer; Music educator
- Works: Discography on Spotify
- Award: Order of the Red Banner of Labour Order of the Badge of Honour

Ziyodullo Shahidi (Tajik: Зиёдулло Шаҳидӣ) was a Tajik musician and father of Persian Symphonic Music in Tajikistan.

After The Second World War, in 1946, a group of Tajik melodists entered Moscow Conservatory, but only one of them managed to graduate from that School of Music. He was Ziyodullo Shahidi (1914–1985). Merging maqam with symphony, he formalised modern Tajik music and became known as an outstanding figure of this form of synthesis. The reconciliation of different cultures as an idea goes back to the philosophy of Abu Ali ibn Sina (born in Bukhara in 980), known in Europe as Avicenna.

Ziyodullo Shahidi was born in Samarkand, Uzbekistan, at the beginning of the century. He overcame two crucial events in the culture of the region: the replacement of Arabic-based Persian and Turkish writing systems by Cyrillic, and the persecution of intellectuals - his father, Muqaddaskhan Shahidi, was murdered during the Bolshevistic terror of 1937. As an amateur musician, virtuoso in several traditional instruments, such as nay (flute), tanbur and dutar (a string instrument), he developed his musical gift in tours beyond Central Asia, and participated in the organisation of the modern theatres in Tashkent and Samarkand. Due to political events he moved to Dushanbe, where he found his own sphere of activity. In 1946, in his mature age, Ziyodullo Shahidi entered the Moscow Conservatory, where he plunged into the atmosphere of the complicated interconnections between the Russian, Caucasian and Central Asian traditions. The masters of musical thinking of that period were varied in their forms of expressions: Schostakovich, Khachaturyan, Khrennikow, Kara-Karaev, etc. His first chamber instrumental pieces, such as Rondo (1948), Concert for piano & violin (1949), were inspired by the search for new forms, styles, and expressions of modern music.

However, vocal art was his favoured form. Transforming the ideas of the classical poets Rudaki, Saadi Sherazi, and Hofiz into the modern musical sphere, and co-operating with contemporary poets such as Lohuti, Tursun-Zoda, Rahimi, Dehoti, he aimed to transform the liberty of their thoughts into a new musical style belonging to his own time. This feature of his art was an integral part of the radio music of that period, linking Tajiks, Uzbeks, Iranians, and Afghans of the 50s and 60s, and bringing them out from their political isolation.

Ziyodullo Shahidi's constant dream to transform maqams into symphony was realized during the early 50s, gradually changing his style of thinking and developing his musical identity. Driven by his enlightening character to draw the attention of his countrymen to symphonic thought, his composition was based on the interpretation of the original classical cycle Shashmaqom within the modern European harmony. His original contribution to that combination was based on the idea of the interconnectedness of common and universal thoughts of both traditions.

The symphony Buzruk (1972) drew the attention of the former Soviet Union's leading musicians by virtue of the 'cordial warmth' of his interpretation. Another composition, the opera Komde and Madan (???), based on Abdulqadir Bedil's poem (17th century), linked classical Persian verse and modern musical symbols, while the opera Gulomon /'The Slaves'/ (1978), a new interpretation of the liberation movement of Central Asia of the turn of the century, utilized some key Tajik folklore. Symphony and Maqam represented a classical contradiction of the musical thought in East & West, as they were formations of two types of cultures which emerged in modern times in the process of liberalization from the political canons of contrasting systems. Ziyodullo Shahidi's contribution to that process was based on his own dramaturgy, coming from the other traditions of interconnection of a variety of things and thoughts.

The artistic interpretation of the love and power of the Symphony of Maqams has four main elements: the first consists of monadic meditations (the theme of Nasri Ushshok - Narrative of the Beloved) and the interaction of Polaris spheres. The second (based on Bebokcha) consists of the feeling of expectation with respect to the coming Fiesta of Meeting, and the third is in itself a Hymn of Love (a new interpretation of the Narrative of the Beloved), which overcomes darkness and suffering of expectation. Finally, the lyric-contemplating monadic theme (new version of Bebokcha) and the various aspects of the whole returns to the starting point, but with the new quality of the wisdom of life.

The philosophical canvas of Ziyodullo Shahidi's Symphony of Maqams is common to the main part of his art. As a more clear cultural tradition, that cyclic type of thinking is the basis of his opera Komde & Madan. Parts of the opera were issued in Moscow at different times during the 60s and 70s, while the score was published in its entirety in 1982. The opera was recorded for Moscow radio under the direction of the well-known Russian conductor G. Rogdestvensky. As part of the repertoire of the Opera and Bali Theater in Dushanbe and Samarkand, it has been staged in our own time. The dancer Komde and the singer Madan, separated by the 'harem culture' of the rulers, form the nucleus of this narrative of two loving hearts. The spectacle itself has two main levels of perception: illustrative and symbolic.

One of the leitmotivs of the opera is Ushshoqi Samarkand - (Beloved of Samarkand), which is the basis of several interpretations, creating a chain of interaction of a variety of images. It is different from European opera, in the sense that the characters are not so distinct. The theme of Madan sometimes appears in Komde's features as she accompanies Madan's arias. Symbolic interconnectiveness is one of the principles of the author's thinking, appearing in all the heroes' solos, the character recitatives, and the texts of the chorus, and thereby providing the clue to the personal, common and universal values of the events of opera. In the wisdom of maqam tradition and symphonic thought, Ziyodullo Shahidi saw not the contradictions of musical traditions, but the harmony of being and the eternity of Love.
