= Nargis Bandishoeva =

Nargis Bandishoeva Наргис Бандишоева
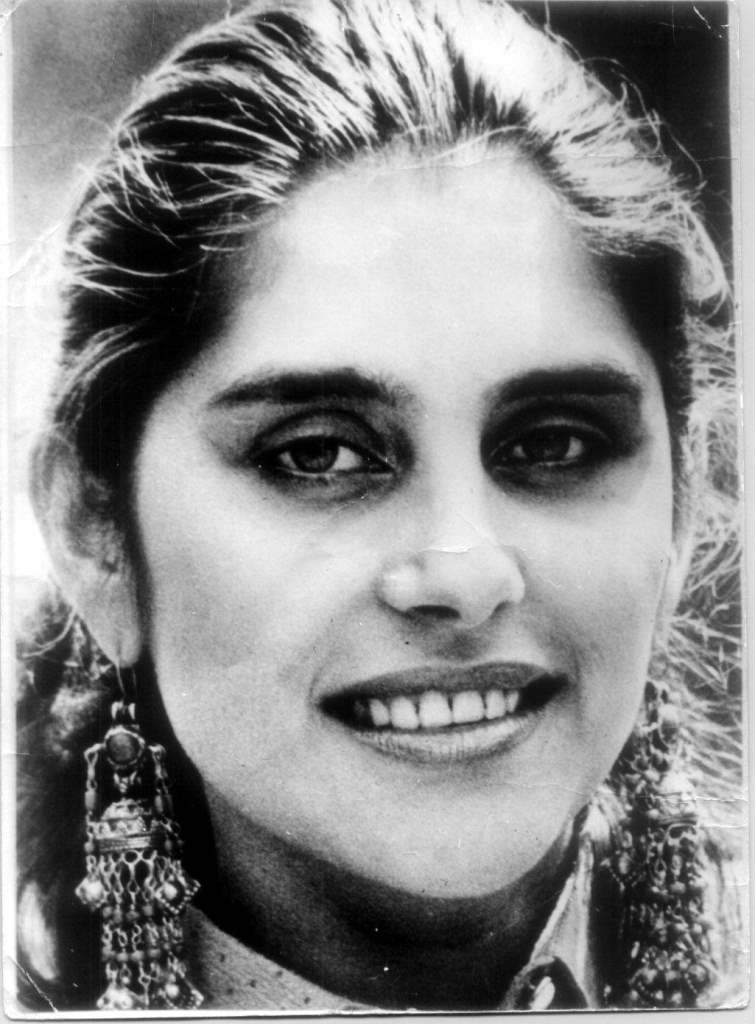

Background information
- Birth name: Nargis Hukumatshoevna Bandishoeva
- Born: October 8, 1966
- Origin: (Tajik Soviet Socialist Republic) Dushanbe, Districts under Central Government Jurisdiction, Tajikistan Soviet Socialist Republic
- Died: September 21, 1991
- Genres: pop
- Instrument: singing

Nargis Hukumatshoevna Bandishoeva (Tajik: Наргис Хукуматшоевна Бандишоева) (October 8, 1966 - September 21, 1991) was a popular pop singer from Tajikistan.

She was born in Dushanbe into the family of the well-known composers. Her parents were Hukumatshoh Bandishoev (October 7, 1938 - 2013) and his wife Bunafsha Bekova.

On September 21, 1991 Bandishoeva died in a car accident.
