= Madina Aknazarova =

Tajik pop singer

Madina Aknazarova Мадина Акназарова
- Born: February 15, 1998 (age 27); Khujand, Sughd Region, Tajikistan
- Genres: Pop, Folk
- Occupation: Singer
- Years active: 2017–present
- Labels: Tamoshow

Madina Aknazarova (Tajik: Мадина Акназарова; born February 15, 1998) is а Tajik pop singer of Pamiri origin, as well as a performer of traditional Persian songs from both Tajikistan and Afghanistan.

== Biography ==
In 2014, after finishing the 9th grade, her family moved to Dushanbe, where Aknazarova entered the Musical College named after Ahmad Boboqulov, the department of academic vocal. During her studies, she practiced at the Ayni Opera and Ballet Theatre. She later moved to Moscow.

== Music career ==
She began her musical career and continued her education at Tajik State Institute of Culture and Arts.

Aknazarova made her debut on the Tajik stage in 2017. An unusual timbre of voice, style of performance, good lyrics and energy helped to quickly find a response in the hearts of the audience. Aknazarova's fanbase grew rapidly, both at concerts and on social networks.

The public liked the first album "Ay Yor Yor" (“Hey Sweetheart”), and very soon they began to invite her to various events, including concerts at the state level.

== Discography ==
=== Albums ===
Year	Album	Song title
2020	Jonu Dilam	Arusu Shah Zebanda
2020	Jonu Dilam	Ay Ki Ba Dushi Sahar
2020	Jonu Dilam	Ay Yor Yor
2020	Jonu Dilam	Biraqsem
2020	Jonu Dilam	Dilakam
2020	Jonu Dilam	Guli Seb
2020	Jonu Dilam	Joni Man
2020	Jonu Dilam	Jonu Dilam
2020	Jonu Dilam	Kori Tu
2020	Jonu Dilam	Ore
2020	Jonu Dilam	Sayri Badahshon
2020	Jonu Dilam	Shab
2020	Jonu Dilam	Tu Budi
2020	Jonu Dilam	Tu Marav
2020	Jonu Dilam	Yad Mekuni
2020	Jonu Dilam	Yori Man
2020	Jonu Dilam	Didam Nigori Khudro
2020	Jonu Dilam	Kabkaki Mast
2020	Jonu Dilam	Sabzinarang
