= Ahmad Wali =

Musician

Ahmad Wali احمد ولی
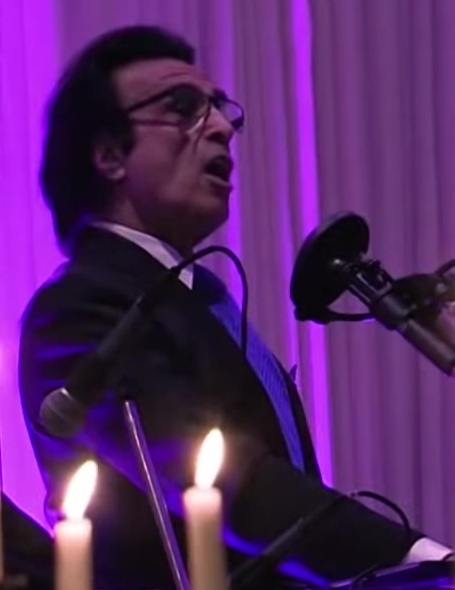

Background information
- Born: Kabul, Kingdom of Afghanistan
- Genres: Pop; Classical Music; Ghazals
- Occupation: Singer
- Years active: 1970–present
- Label: Various

Ahmad Wali (Pashto/Dari: احمد ولی) is an Afghan Ghazal singer. He began his career in the 1970s, becoming popular in his native country before he was forced to flee by political upheaval in Afghanistan. He continued his work after resettling in Germany, performing throughout Europe and North America.

== Background ==
Ahmad Wali was born in Kabul. His father, Mohammad Akram Nawabi, was a former police commander who served in various provinces across Afghanistan. He began exploring music as a Tabla player at the age of 12, gradually expanding into singing. While a student at Habibia High School, he recorded a demo tape which came to the attention of Radio Kabul director and famous Afghan singer Ustad Zaland. Soon afterward, Ahmad Wali performed two other songs: "Chashman–e–Abee," a piece composed by Zaland, and "Mah-ruye-tu" a song composed by Wali himself. Wali performed live throughout Afghanistan until after his high school graduation when he joined an international musical performance in Iran.

== Career ==
At the early stages of his career, Wali had not yet committed to life as a professional musician, and enrolled in the Kabul Police Academy. He continued performing and soon committed to a career in music, being taken as a student by Ustad Zaland. He developed a following throughout Afghanistan, with frequent appearances on national television and radio programs, as well as live performances.

After the Saur Revolution of 1978, life in Afghanistan became difficult, and in 1980, shortly after the invasion of Afghanistan by the Soviet Union, Wali—then a well-known musician in his homeland—fled the country with a forged passport. Wali's forged passport got him as far as India, where he obtained a visa to Germany by faking an illness. In 1984 and 1985 Wali's concerts in Germany, France, Switzerland, England, and Sweden helped raise funds in support of Afghan refugees displaced by the Soviet-Afghan conflict. During the same years, he also held a joint fundraising concert with German singer Peter Maffay. In 1987, Wali performed a series of benefit concerts with Abdullah Atemadi and Ensemble in New York, California, and Virginia. On 18 August 2005, Wali performed at the Embassy of Afghanistan in Washington D.C., to celebrate Afghanistan's National Independence Day.

On October 19th, 2024, Wali received the coveted Lifetime Achievement Award at the 3rd Annual Tuti Gala at San Jose Civic in San Jose, California. This award is presented by Tuti Media honoring artists who have made significant contributions to the cultural heritage of Afghanistan and the region.
