= Mojgan Azimi =

Afghan singer

- مژگان عظیمی
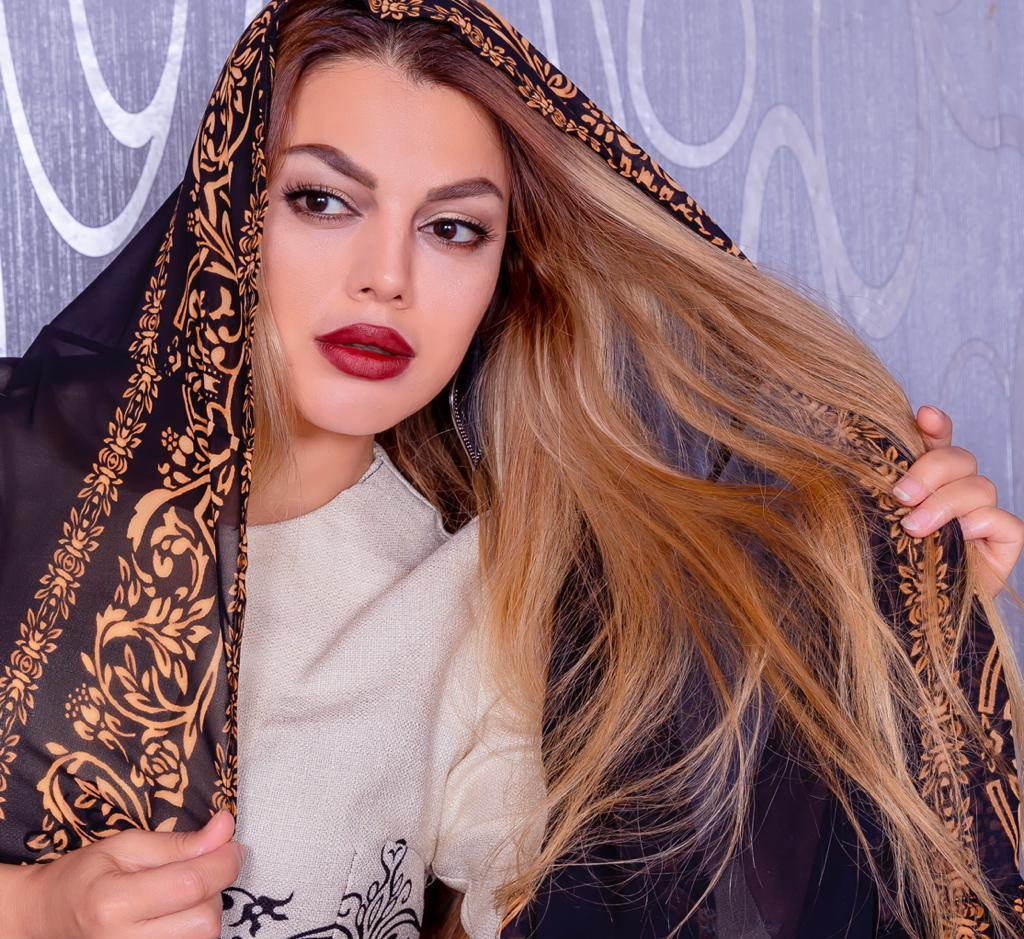
- Born: Mojgan Azimi; June 5, 1993 (age 32); Herat, Afghanistan
- Occupations: Singer; Songwriter; Painter
- Notable work: Ayeh (song)
- Height: 168 cm (5 ft 6 in)
- Musical career
- Genres: Rock; feminism-pop; Afghan folkloric music
- Instruments: Vocals; guitar; piano

Mojgan Azimi (Dari: مژگان عظیمی; born August 21, 1991) is an Afghan singer and painter.

== Biography ==
Azimi was born on August 21, 1991, in Kerman, Iran. The Azimi family immigrated to Iran after the Afghan Civil War and settled in Mashhad then Kerman. She completed her primary and secondary education in Iran and then emigrated to Germany with her family. The Azimi family subsequently moved to Switzerland. She is currently living in Switzerland.

== Activities ==
Azimi started her artistic activities at the age of 10 with oil painting. She later studied classical guitar and completed vocal lessons at the age of 18. She has recorded "Ayah" and "twenty-five years" in Iran in 2018. The music video for "Ayah" is known as her first professional work. It has rich messages supporting women's human rights, and condemnation of customs and gender discrimination beliefs about them in Afghanistan.

She published "Hakeman" at the beginning of autumn 2018. The song won the first prize for best singer, best music, and best songwriting at the 2018 San Francisco Rumi International Music Awards.
