= Jalil Zaland =

Ustad Jalil Zaland
- Born: c. 1930 or 1935; Kabul, Afghanistan
- Died: April 30, 2009; Tarzana, Los Angeles, United States
- Occupations: Singer, poet, music composer
- Spouse: Sara
- Children: 8

Jalil Zaland (Dari: جلیل زلاند also romanized Jalil Zoland; c. 1935 – 2009) was a veteran singer and composer of Afghanistan's golden music era. Zaland was one of the biggest music stars of Afghanistan, earning the honorific Ustad and was therefore best known as Ustad Zaland (استاد زولاند or استاد زلاند). As a Persian speaker, his classic melodies were also highly acclaimed in Iran and Tajikistan.

Zaland along with Salim Sarmast and Nangyalai created the first amateur band for Radio Afghanistan. He also composed several national anthems of Afghanistan and was also known for the composition of hit song "Man Amadeam", famously performed by Iranian star Googosh. Also at Radio Afghanistan he led the creation of a 30-piece orchestra of Eastern and Western music, which was very influential in the history of the music of Afghanistan. Zaland was one of the early teachers of Ahmad Wali.

== Family ==
He hailed from a musical family: Jalil is the father of Farid Zoland, Shahla Zaland, Soheila Zaland, Wahid Zaland, Mina Zaland, Mirwais Zaland, and Mahmood Zaland, all of whom are also involved in music.
