= Tajik language =

Variety of Persian language

Tajik
- Tajiki Persian
- Тоҷикӣ Tojikī تاجيکى or تاجکى форсии тоҷикӣ Forsii Tojikī فارسى تاجيکى or فارسى تاجکى
- "Tojikī" written in Cyrillic script and Perso-Arabic script (Nastaʿlīq calligraphy)
- Native to: Tajikistan; Uzbekistan
- Region: Central Asia
- Ethnicity: Tajiks
- Native speakers: 10.5 million (2022–2023)
- Language family: Indo-European: Indo-Iranian; Iranian; Western Iranian; Southwestern Iranian; Classical Persian; Tajik
- Dialects: Bukharian
- Writing system: Cyrillic (Tajik alphabet); Historically: Arabic (Persian alphabet); Latin (Yañalif-based); Hebrew (by Bukharan Jews); Tajik Braille

Official status
- Official language in: Tajikistan
- Recognised minority language in: Uzbekistan; Russia
- Regulated by: Rudaki Institute of Language and Literature

Language codes
- ISO 639-1: tg
- ISO 639-2: tgk
- ISO 639-3: tgk
- Glottolog: taji1245
- Linguasphere: 58-AAC-ci
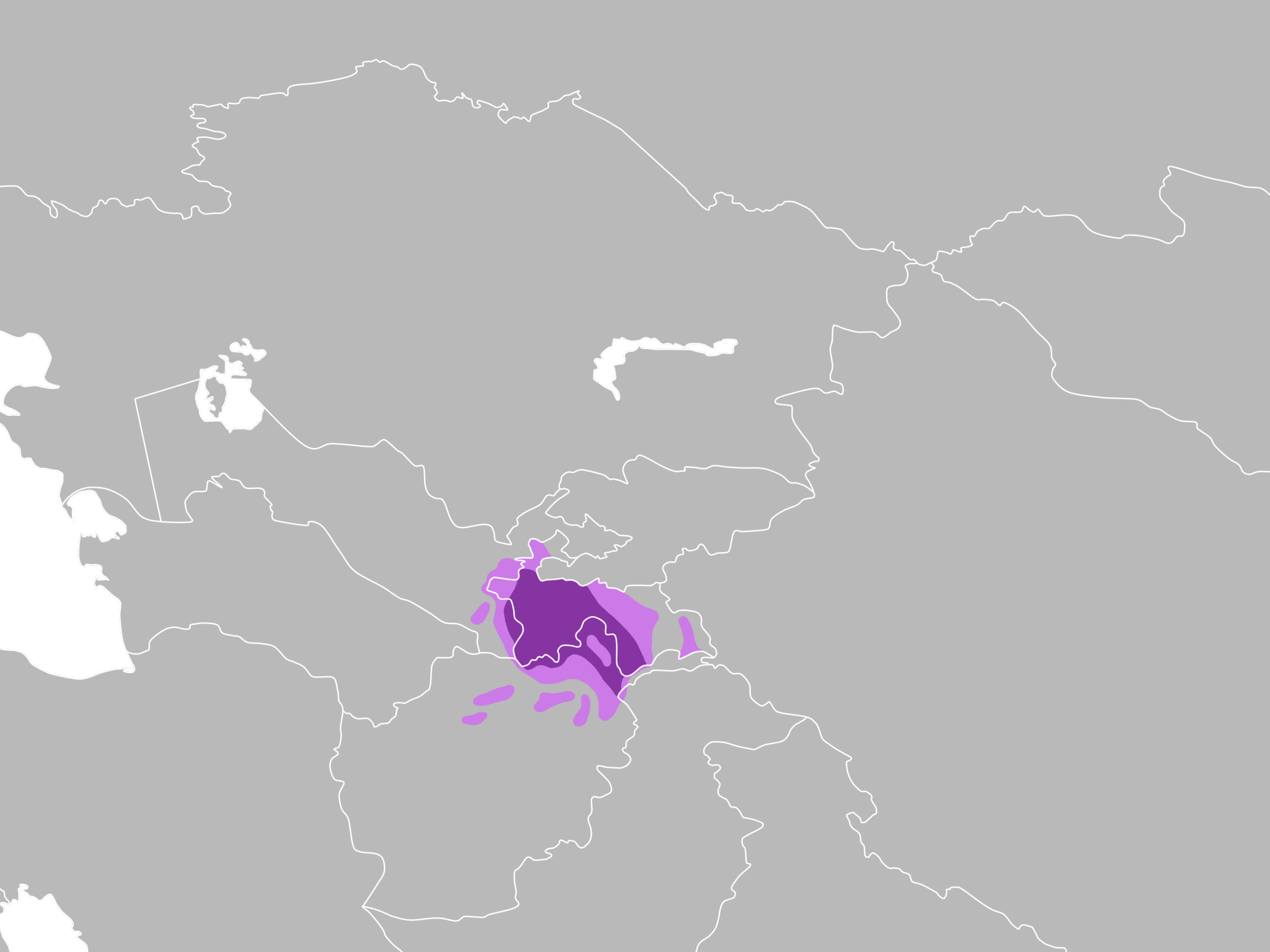
- Areas where Tajik speakers comprise a majority shown in dark purple, and areas where Tajik speakers comprise a sizeable minority shown in light purple

A man speaking Tajik.

Tajik, (Note: Endonym: (забони) тоҷикӣ, (zaboni) tojikī, pronounced [(zɐˈbɔni) tʰɔdʒiˈkʰi]) Tajik Persian, Tajiki Persian, (Note: Tajik: форсии тоҷикӣ, forsii tojikī, pronounced [fɔɾˈsiji tʰɔdʒiˈkʰi]) also called Tajiki, as well as sometimes referred to as Eastern Persian, (Note: Along with Dari) is the variety of the Persian language spoken in Tajikistan and Uzbekistan by ethnic Tajiks. It is closely related to neighbouring Dari in Afghanistan, with which it forms a continuum of mutually intelligible varieties of Persian. Several scholars consider Tajik to be a dialectal variety of Persian rather than a language in its own right. The question of whether Tajik and Persian should be considered two dialects of a single language or two discrete languages has political aspects to it.

Through Early New Persian, Tajik, like Iranian Persian and Dari Persian, is a continuation of Middle Persian, the official administrative, religious, and literary language of the Sasanian Empire (224–651 CE), itself a continuation of Old Persian, the language of the Achaemenid Empire (550–330 BC).

Tajiki is one of the two official languages of Tajikistan, the other being Russian, which serves as the official interethnic language. In Afghanistan, this language is less influenced by Turkic languages and is regarded as a form of Dari, which has co‑official status. The Tajiki Persian of Tajikistan has diverged from Persian as spoken in Afghanistan, and even more from that of Iran, owing to political borders, geographical isolation, standardisation processes, and the influence of Russian and neighbouring Turkic languages. The standard language is based on the north‑western dialects of Tajik (the region of the old major city of Samarqand), which have been somewhat influenced by the neighbouring Uzbek language as a result of geographical proximity. Tajik also retains numerous archaic elements in its vocabulary, pronunciation, and grammar that have been lost elsewhere in the Persophone world, in part because of its relative isolation in the mountains of Central Asia.

== Name ==
Up to and including the 19th century, speakers in Afghanistan and Central Asia had no separate name for the language and simply regarded themselves as speaking Farsi, which is the endonym for the Persian language, though Tajiki is attested as the name of a language variety in at least one late-19th-century record, which applies it specifically to the Farsi dialect of Bukharans. The term Tajik derives from Persian, although it has been adopted by the speakers themselves. For most of the 20th century, its name was rendered in the Russian spelling of Tadzhik.

In 1989, with the growth of Tajik nationalism, a law was enacted declaring Tajik the state (national) language, with Russian as the official language (as throughout the Union). In addition, the law officially equated Tajik with Persian, placing the word Farsi (the endonym for the Persian language) after Tajik. The law also called for a gradual reintroduction of the Perso‑Arabic alphabet.

In 1999, the word Farsi was removed from the state language law.

== Geographical distribution ==
Two major cities of Central Asia, Samarkand and Bukhara, are in present‑day Uzbekistan, but are defined by a prominent native usage of the Tajik language. Today, virtually all Tajik speakers in Bukhara are bilingual in Tajik and Uzbek. This Tajik–Uzbek bilingualism has had a strong influence on the phonology, morphology, and syntax of Bukharan Tajik.

Tajiks are also found in large numbers in the Surxondaryo Region in the south and along Uzbekistan's eastern border with Tajikistan. Tajiki is still spoken by the majority of the population in Samarkand and Bukhara today, although, as Richard Foltz has noted, their spoken dialects diverge considerably from the standard literary language and most cannot read it.

Official statistics in Uzbekistan state that the Tajik community comprises 5% of the nation's total population. However, these numbers do not include ethnic Tajiks who, for a variety of reasons, choose to identify themselves as Uzbeks in population census forms.

During the Soviet 'Uzbekisation' supervised by Sharof Rashidov, the head of the Uzbek Communist Party, Tajiks had to choose either to stay in Uzbekistan and be registered as Uzbek in their passports or to leave the republic for the less‑developed agricultural and mountainous Tajikistan. The 'Uzbekisation' movement ended in 1924.

In Tajikistan, Tajiks constitute 80% of the population, and the language dominates in most parts of the country. Some Tajiks in Gorno-Badakhshan in south‑eastern Tajikistan, where the Pamir languages are the native languages of most residents, are bilingual. Tajiks are the dominant ethnic group in northern Afghanistan as well and are also the majority group in scattered pockets elsewhere in the country, particularly in urban areas such as Kabul, Mazar-i-Sharif, Kunduz, Ghazni, and Herat. Tajiks constitute between 25% and 35% of the total population of the country. In Afghanistan, the dialects spoken by ethnic Tajiks are written using the Persian alphabet and referred to as Dari, along with the dialects of other groups in Afghanistan such as the Hazaragi and Aimaq dialects. Approximately 48%–58% of Afghan citizens are native speakers of Dari. A large Tajik‑speaking diaspora exists owing to the instability that has plagued Central Asia in recent years, with significant numbers of Tajiks found in Russia, Kazakhstan, and beyond. This Tajik diaspora is also the result of the poor state of the economy of Tajikistan; each year approximately one million men leave Tajikistan to find employment in Russia.

== Dialects ==
Tajik dialects can be roughly divided into the following groups:

1. Northern dialects (Northern Tajikistan, Bukhara, Samarkand, Kyrgyzstan, and the Varzob valley region of Dushanbe).
2. Central dialects (dialects of the upper Zarafshan Valley).
3. Southern dialects (south and east of Dushanbe, Kulob, and the Rasht region of Tajikistan).
4. Southeastern dialects (dialects of the Darvoz region and the Amu Darya near Rushon).

The dialect used by the Bukharan Jews of Central Asia is known as the Bukhori dialect and belongs to the northern dialect grouping. It is chiefly distinguished by the inclusion of Hebrew terms, principally religious vocabulary, and the historical use of the Hebrew alphabet. Despite these differences, Bukhori is readily intelligible to other Tajik speakers, particularly speakers of northern dialects.

A very important moment in the development of contemporary Tajik, especially of the spoken language, is the tendency towards a change in its dialectal orientation. The dialects of Northern Tajikistan were the foundation of the prevalent standard Tajik, while the Southern dialects did not enjoy either popularity or prestige. Now, all politicians and public officials make their speeches in the Kulob dialect, which is also used in broadcasting.

== Phonology ==
=== Vowels ===
The table below lists the six vowel phonemes in standard, literary Tajik. Letters from the Tajik Cyrillic alphabet are given first, followed by IPA transcription. Local dialects frequently have more than the six seen below.

Tajik vowels
	Front	Central	Back
Close	и ӣ /i/		у /u/
Mid	е /e̞/	ӯ /ɵ̞/~/o̞/	
Open	а /a/~/æ/		о /ɔ/

In northern and Uzbek dialects, classical /o̞/ has shifted forward in the mouth to /ɵ̞/. In central and southern dialects, classical /o̞/ has shifted upward and merged into /u/. In the Zarafshon dialect, earlier /u/ has shifted to /y/ or /ʊ/, however /u/ from earlier /ɵ/ remained (possibly due to influence from Yaghnobi).

The open back vowel has varyingly been described as mid-back [o̞], [ɒ], [ɔ] and [ɔː]. It is analogous to Early New, Classical and Dari/Afghan Persian ā, and Iranian Persian â (i.e., long a). However, it is standardly not a back vowel.

The vowel ⟨Ӣ ӣ⟩ usually represents a stressed /i/ at the end of a word. However, not all instances of ⟨Ӣ ӣ⟩ are stressed, as can be seen with the second person singular suffix -ӣ remaining unstressed.

The vowels /i/, /u/ and /a/ may be reduced to [ə] in unstressed syllables.

=== Consonants ===
The Tajik language contains 24 consonants, 16 of which form contrastive pairs by voicing: [б/п] [в/ф] [д/т] [з/с] [ж/ш] [ҷ/ч] [г/к] [ғ/х]. The table below lists the consonant phonemes in standard, literary Tajik. Letters from the Tajik Cyrillic alphabet are given first, followed by IPA transcription.

		Labial	Dental/ Alveolar	Post-alv./ Palatal	Velar	Uvular	Glottal
Nasal		м /m/	н /n/				
Stop/ Affricate	voiceless	п /p/	т /t/	ч /tʃ/	к /k/	қ /q/	ъ /ʔ/
Stop/ Affricate	voiced	б /b/	д /d/	ҷ /dʒ/	г /ɡ/		
Fricative	voiceless	ф /f/	с /s/	ш /ʃ/		х /χ/	ҳ /h/
Fricative	voiced	в /v/	з /z/	ж /ʒ/		ғ /ʁ/	
Approximant			л /l/	й /j/			
Trill			р /r/				

At least in the dialect of Bukhara, ⟨Ч ч⟩ and ⟨Ҷ ҷ⟩ are pronounced /tɕ/ and /dʑ/ respectively, with ⟨Ш ш⟩ and ⟨Ж ж⟩ also being /ɕ/ and /ʑ/.

=== Word stress ===
Word stress generally falls on the first syllable in finite verb forms and on the last syllable in nouns and noun-like words. Examples of where stress does not fall on the last syllable are adverbs like: бале (bale, meaning "yes") and зеро (zero, meaning "because"). Stress also does not fall on enclitics, nor on the marker of the direct object.

== Grammar ==
The word order of Tajiki Persian is subject–object–verb. Tajik Persian grammar is similar to the classical Persian grammar (and the grammar of modern varieties such as Iranian Persian). The most notable difference between classical Persian grammar and Tajik Persian grammar is the construction of the present progressive tense in each language. In Tajik, the present progressive form consists of a present progressive participle, from the verb истодан, istodan, 'to stand' and a cliticised form of the verb -acт, -ast, 'to be'.

Ман мактуб навишта истода-ам
man maktub navišta istoda-am
I letter write be
'I am writing a letter.'

In Iranian Persian, the present progressive form consists of the verb دار, dār, 'to have' followed by a conjugated verb in either the simple present tense, the habitual past tense or the habitual past perfect tense.

من دارم کار می‌کنم
man dār-am kār mē:-kun-am
I have work do
'I am working.'

=== Nouns ===
Nouns are not marked for grammatical gender, although they are marked for number.

Two forms of grammatical number exist in Tajik, singular and plural. The plural is marked by either the suffix -ҳо -ho or -он -on (with contextual variants -ён -yon and -гон -gon), although Arabic loan words do use Arabic forms (thus forming irregular plurals). There is no definite article, but the indefinite article exists in the form of the number "one" як yak and -е -e, the first positioned before the noun and the second joining the noun as a suffix. When a noun is used as a direct object, it is marked by the suffix -ро -ro, e.g., Рустамро задам Rustam-ro zadam 'I hit Rustam'. This direct object suffix is added to the word after any plural suffixes. The form -ро can be literary or formal. In older forms of the Persian language, -ро could indicate both direct and indirect objects and some phrases used in modern Persian and Tajik have maintained this suffix on indirect objects, as seen in the following example: Худоро шукр خدا را شکر (Xudoro šukr) 'Thank God'. Modern Persian does not use the direct object marker as a suffix on the noun, but rather, as a stand-alone morpheme.

=== Prepositions ===
Simple prepositions
Tajik	English
аз (az)	from, through, across
ба (ba)	to
бар (bar)	on, upon, onto
бе (be)	without
бо (bo)	with
дар (dar)	at, in
то (to)	up to, as far as, until
чун (čun)	like, as

== Vocabulary ==
Tajik is conservative in its vocabulary, retaining numerous terms that have long since fallen into disuse in Iran and Afghanistan, such as арзиз ارزیز (arziz) 'tin' and фарбеҳ فربه (farbeh) 'fat'. Most modern loan words in Tajik come from Russian, as a result of Tajikistan's position within the Soviet Union. The vast majority of these Russian loanwords have entered the Tajik language through the fields of socioeconomics, technology, and government, where most of the concepts and vocabulary have been borrowed from Russian. The introduction of Russian loanwords into Tajik was largely justified under Soviet policy of modernisation and the necessary subordination of all languages to Russian for the achievement of a Communist state. Vocabulary also comes from the geographically close Uzbek language and, as is usual in Islamic countries, from Arabic. Since the late 1980s, an effort has been made to replace loanwords with native equivalents, using either old terms that had fallen out of use or coined terminology (including from Iranian Persian). Many of the coined terms for modern items—such as гармкунак گرم‌کنک (garmkunak) 'heater' and чангкашак چنگ‌کشک čangkašak 'vacuum cleaner'—differ from their Afghan and Iranian equivalents, adding to the difficulty in intelligibility between Tajik and other forms of Persian.

In the table below, Persian refers to the standard language of Iran, which differs somewhat from the Dari Persian of Afghanistan. Two other Iranian languages—Pashto and Kurdish (Kurmanji and Sorani)—have also been included for comparative purposes.

Tajik	моҳ moh	нав nav	модар modar	хоҳар xohar	шаб šab	бинӣ binī	се se	сиёҳ siyoh	сурх surx	зард zard	сабз sabz	гург gurg
Other Iranian languages
Persian	ماه māh	نَو naw now	مادَر mādar	خْواهَر xwāhar	شَب šab	بِینِی bīnī	سِه si se	سِياه siyāh	سُرْخ surx sorx	زَرْد zard	سَبْز sabz	گُرْگ gurg gorg
Pashto	مْیاشْت myâsht	نٙوَی نٙوَے nəway	مور mor	خور xor	ښْپَه shpa	پوزَه poza	دْرې dre	تور tor	سُور sur	زْیَړ zyaṛ	شِين، زٙرْغُون shin, zərghun	لېوٙه لېوۀ lewə
Kurdish (Kurmanji)	meh	nû	dê	xwîşk	şev	poz	sisê, sê	reş	sor	zer	kesk	gur
Kurdish (Sorani)	mang	nwê	dayik	xoşk	şew	lût	sê	reş	sûr	zerd	sewz	gurg
Other Indo-European languages
English	month	new	mother	sister	night	nose	three	black	red	yellow	green	wolf
Armenian	ամիս amis	նոր nor	մայր mayr	քույր k'uyr	գիշեր gišer	քիթ k'it'	երեք yerek'	սև sev	կարմիր karmir	դեղին deġin	կանաչ kanač	գայլ gayl
Sanskrit	मास māsa	नव nava	मातृ mātr̥	स्वसृ svasr̥	नक्त nakta	नास nāsa	त्रि tri	श्याम śyāma	रुधिर rudhira	पीत pīta	हरित harita	वृक vr̥ka
Russian	месяц mesjac	новый novyj	мать matʹ	сестра sestra	ночь nočʹ	нос nos	три tri	чёрный čërnyj	красный, рыжий krasnyj, ryžij	жёлтый žëltyj	зелёный zelënyj	волк volk

== Writing system ==
Tajik ASSR 1929 coat of arms with Tajik language in Perso-Arabic script: جمهوريت اجتماعی شوروى مختار تاجيكستان; Current script: Ҷумҳурият Иҷтимоӣ Шӯравӣ Мухтор Тоҷикистон

In Tajikistan and other countries of the former Soviet Union, Tajik Persian is currently written in the Cyrillic script, although it was written in the Latin script from 1928 and in the Arabic alphabet prior to 1928. In the Tajik Soviet Socialist Republic, the use of the Latin script was later replaced in 1939 by the Cyrillic script. The Tajik alphabet added six additional letters to the Cyrillic script inventory, and these additional letters are distinguished in Tajik orthography by the use of diacritics.

== History ==
According to many scholars, the New Persian language (which subsequently evolved into the Persian forms spoken in Iran, Afghanistan, and Tajikistan) developed in Transoxiana and Khorasan, in what are today parts of Afghanistan, Iran, Uzbekistan, and Tajikistan. While New Persian was descended primarily from Middle Persian, it also incorporated substantial elements of other Iranian languages of ancient Central Asia, such as Sogdian.

Following the Islamic conquest of Iran and most of Central Asia in the 8th century AD, Arabic for a time became the court language, and Persian and other Iranian languages were relegated to the private sphere. In the 9th century AD, following the rise of the Samanids, whose state was centred around the cities of Bukhara (Buxoro), Samarqand, and Herat and covered much of Uzbekistan, Tajikistan, Afghanistan, and north-eastern Iran, New Persian emerged as the court language and swiftly displaced Arabic.

New Persian became the lingua franca of Central Asia for centuries, although it eventually lost ground to the Chaghatai language in much of its former domains as a growing number of Turkic tribes moved into the region from the east. Since the 16th century AD, Tajik has come under increasing pressure from neighbouring Turkic languages. Once spoken in areas of Turkmenistan, such as Merv, Tajik is today virtually non-existent in that country. Uzbek has also largely replaced Tajik in most areas of modern Uzbekistan—the Russian Empire in particular implemented Turkification among Tajiks in Ferghana and Samarqand, replacing the dominant language in those areas with Uzbek. Nevertheless, Tajik persisted in pockets, notably in Samarqand, Bukhara, and Surxondaryo Region, as well as in much of what is today Tajikistan.

The creation of the Tajik Soviet Socialist Republic within the Soviet Union in 1929 helped to safeguard the future of Tajik, as it became an official language of the republic alongside Russian. Still, substantial numbers of Tajik speakers remained outside the borders of the republic, mostly in the neighbouring Uzbek Soviet Socialist Republic, which created a source of tension between Tajiks and Uzbeks. Neither Samarqand nor Bukhara was included in the nascent Tajik SSR, despite their immense historical importance in Tajik history. After the creation of the Tajik SSR, a large number of ethnic Tajiks from the Uzbek SSR migrated there, particularly to the region of the capital, Dushanbe, exercising a substantial influence on the republic's political, cultural, and economic life. The influence of this influx of ethnic Tajik immigrants from the Uzbek SSR is most prominently manifested in the fact that literary Tajik is based on their north-western dialects of the language, rather than the central dialects that are spoken by the natives in the Dushanbe region and adjacent areas.

After the fall of the Soviet Union and Tajikistan's independence in 1991, the government of Tajikistan has made substantial efforts to promote the use of Tajik in all spheres of public and private life. Tajik is gaining ground among the once-Russified upper classes and continues its role as the vernacular of the majority of the country's population. There has been a rise in the number of Tajik publications. Increasing contact with media from Iran and Afghanistan, after decades of isolation under the Soviets, as well as governmental orientation towards a Persianization of the language, have brought Tajik and the other Persian dialects closer together.

== See also ==
- Academy of Persian Language and Literature
- Bukhori Judeo-Tajik dialect
- Iranian peoples
- Iranian studies
- List of Persian poets and authors
- List of Tajik musicians
- Tajik alphabet
- Surudi Milli
- Help:IPA/Persian
