= Muboraksho Mirzoshoyev =

Muboraksho Mirzoshoyev Муборакшо Мирзошоев

Background information
- Born: Muboraksho Abdulvahhobovich Mirzoshoyev; August 19, 1961; Yemts, Rushon district, Gorno-Badakhshan Autonomous Oblast (GBAO), Tajikistan Soviet Socialist Republic
- Died: February 8, 2001 (aged 39) Tajikistan
- Genre: Pop
- Occupations: Singer, songwriter, musician
- Instrument: Vocals
- Years active: 1988 – 2001

Muboraksho Abdulvahhobovich Mirzoshoyev (Tajik: Муборакшо Абдулваҳҳобович Мирзошоев; 19 August 1961 – 8 February 2001), better known as Muboraksho (Муборакшо) or Misha (Миша), was a Tajikistani Pamiri singer and composer recognized alongside Daler Nazarov as a pioneer of rock music.

== Career ==
Muboraksho spent his childhood in his home village of Yemts (Russian: Емц) in Rushon, Rushon District, Gorno-Badakhshan Autonomous Oblast (GBAO). At the age of 14, he composed his first song, "Chor Javon" ("Four Youths") which later became an instant hit across Tajikistan, when it hit the radio waves in the late 1980s.

From 1984 to 1987 he studied at Leningrad (present-day St. Petersburg) Leningrad Aviation Institute, but his early success solidified his desire to pursue a career in music. Muboraksho, or Misha, as fans endearingly knew him, started his professional music career in 1988 when he joined Daler Nazarov's music group after he was introduced to Nazarov by Ikbol Zavkibekov, a professional musician and son of famous Tajik actor and musician Gurminj Zavkibekov. The same year Muboraksho Mirzoshoyev's music became very popular in Tajikistan.

Some of Muboraksho's music centered on the themes of sadness and mysticism, which evoked strong emotions in his fans. He was very close and dear to all Tajiks, as his music and lyrics, some of which borrowed from the medieval mystical Persian poets were able to capture the imagination of his fanbase. His repertoire also included some very upbeat songs. One of his greatest hits was "Ay yōrum biyō" (in Tajik Ай ёрум биё) released in 1988, which has become a staple at weddings throughout Tajikistan.

Tajik cinematographer Yormahmad Aralov made a film starring Daler Nazarov, which became a hit in the USSR. Muboraksho's songs were played for the character Shodkom in Kumir (The Idol), opposite of Khurshed, Nazarov's character. Muboraksho himself resisted playing the role citing that he did not want people to judge that Daler Nazarov (Khurshed) could ever be replaced by Muboraksho in real life.

Many musicians have made covers of Muboraksho's songs including n.A.T.o. The Persian rock group Kiosk also made an Iranian cover version of "Ay yōrum biyō" as "Ay Yarom Bia" featuring Mohsen Namjoo.

Muboraksho is a cultural symbol of the Tajik popular music of the 20th century, who had been among a very few artists that have had an enormous influence on the contemporary Tajik music scene. His music has been one of the primary unifying forces among the diverse ethnic groups of Tajikistan. He is cited as one of the major influences among the current Tajik musicians.

He was married and the father of three sons: Aslisho, Sayyod and Imomalisho. His youngest son Imomalisho became an emerging singer who has followed his father's footsteps. In 2001, Muboraksho was beaten up during a wedding performance, which significantly worsened his health as he had been struggling with bilateral pulmonary tuberculosis. He was hospitalised and died on 8 February 2001.

== Discography ==
Despite his popularity, Muboraksho never released any official album during his lifetime. In 1997, however, there was a release (without Daler Nazarov's or Muboraksho's estate permission) of two non-official albums entitled Jiray-1 and Jiray-2. The first album contained mostly Daler Nazarov's songs (except for one), while the second album had 13 of Muboraksho's songs, including "Ay yorum biyo".

The full tracklist of the album Jiray-2 includes:
- "Туро намепарастам"
- "Сабза ба ноз"
- "Дерест, ки дилдор паёме нафиристод"
- "Дӯстат дорам"
- "Ай ёрум биё" ("Ay yorum biyo")
- "Акрамҷон"
- "Нола дорам"
- "Чор ҷавон"
- "Ё Алӣ мадатке"
- "Модак лай-лай"
- "Гушнаи тири нигоҳат"
- "Ғарибӣ"
- "Рақс бикун"

=== Singles ===
- 1988: "Ay yorum biyo"
