= Health and environmental effects of satellite signal jamming in Iran =

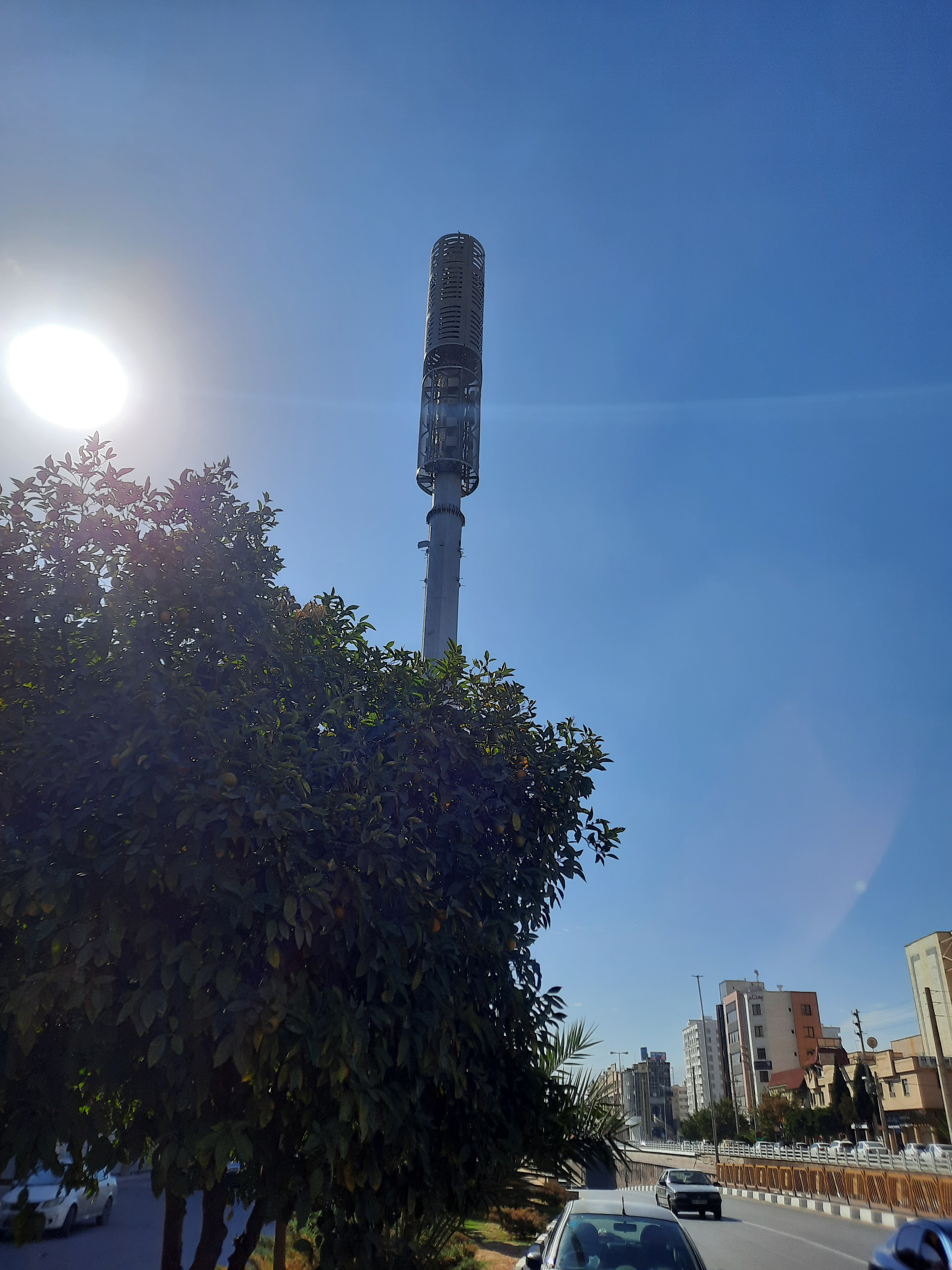
A telecommunications BTS tower with satellite jamming equipment

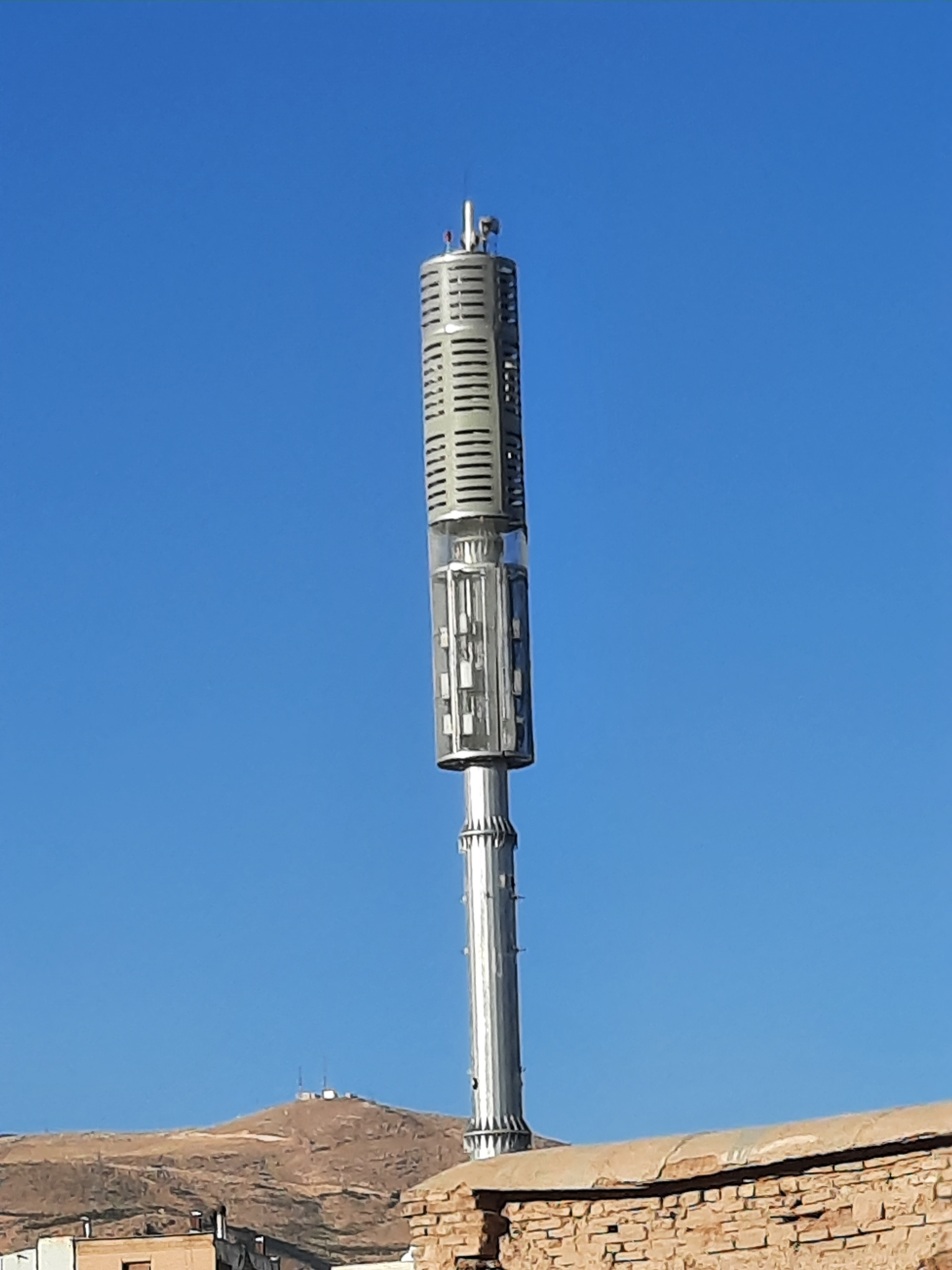
Jamming devices installed on a mobile phone tower

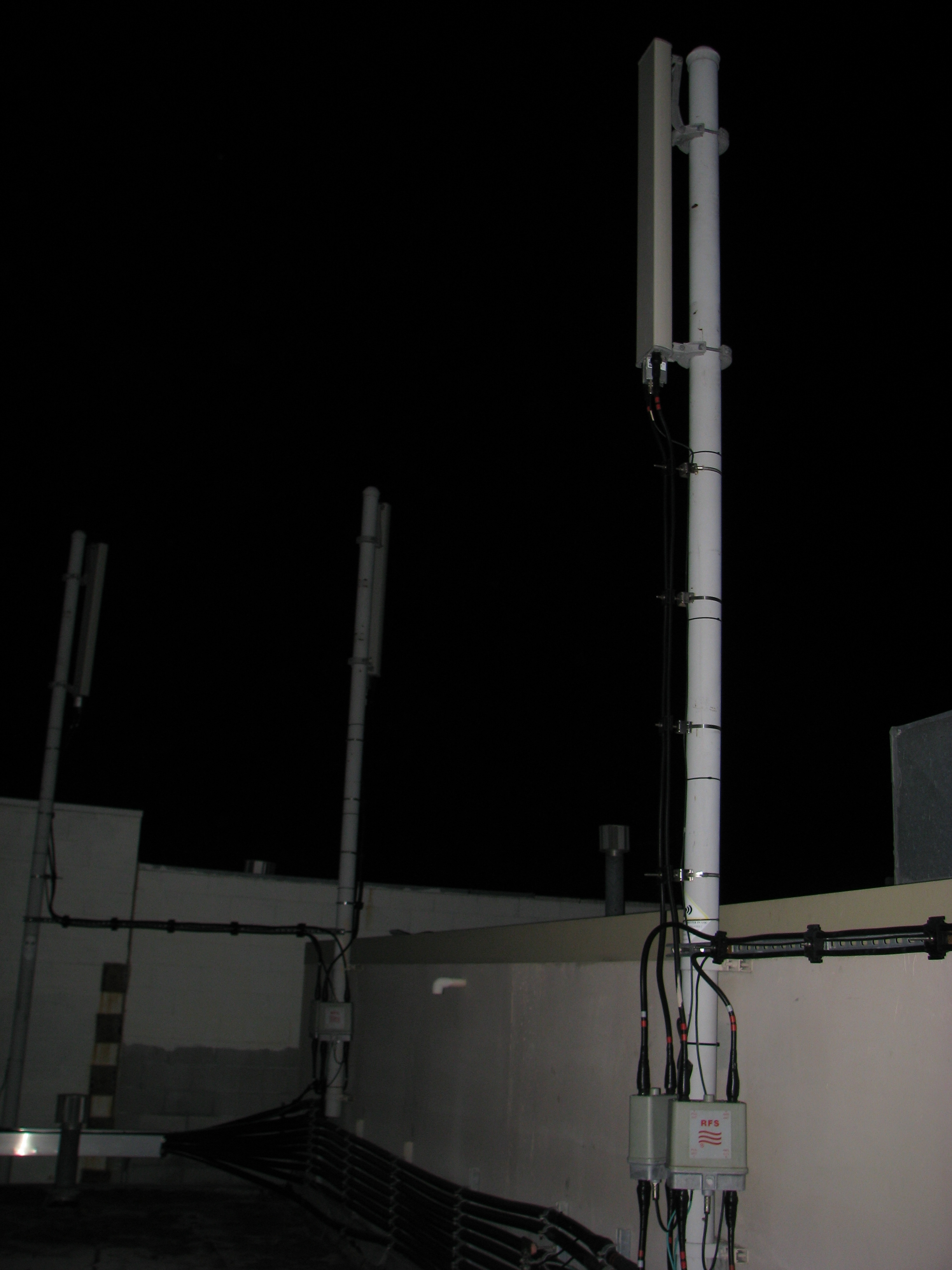
A radio frequency transmitter

Negative effects of jamming (Satellite network interference in Iran) refer to the harms caused by the generation and transmission of electromagnetic waves and microwaves by an unspecified part of the Government of the Islamic Republic of Iran to prevent the reception of television signals from opposition broadcasters. All scientific reports so far have failed to persuade Iranian authorities to halt the practice. According to Article 688 of the Islamic Penal Code, the Ministry of Health and the Department of Environment are required to file a complaint with the local prosecutor if public health, medical, or environmental violations occur. Iran is also a signatory to the International Covenant on Civil and Political Rights and the International Covenant on Economic, Social and Cultural Rights, both of which are legally binding domestically. Under these treaties, the Government of Iran is obliged to provide standard health and environmental conditions for its citizens, but this has never been implemented.

== Health ==
Electromagnetic and microwave jamming waves can destroy human cells.

Gholamhossein Riazi, director of the Institute of Biochemistry and Biophysics, has researched the effects of electromagnetic waves for many years. He states:

Claiming that sufficient research does not exist is not a valid reason; wherever necessary, we must conduct research for public health. Many domestic and foreign sources on electromagnetic waves and their effects on humans are easily accessible. These waves—such as jamming signals, microwaves, telecommunication and satellite signals—do not exist naturally on Earth. Any new phenomenon introduced into the natural environment can cause long-term disruption. Research shows that prolonged exposure to electromagnetic waves can impair cell function. Our department has studied the effects of these waves on proteins for years, and we have observed that their function is disrupted by exposure.

=== Effects on DNA ===
Research indicates that electromagnetic waves also cause changes to DNA. Since cells are composed of proteins, damage observed in proteins can be extended to cells.

=== Cancer ===
The impact of these waves on health especially their role in increasing cancer rates is undeniable. The Department of Environment formed a committee to investigate the effects of jamming on health and concluded that these waves are carcinogenic and must be stopped immediately. The Deputy for Human Environment of the Department of Environment emphasized their carcinogenicity and urged authorities to find alternative methods for “cultural invasion” countermeasures.

Research at Shiraz University of Medical Sciences found that these waves increase the likelihood of cancer. Few studies have been conducted, and those available indicate carcinogenic effects.

=== Miscarriage ===
The role of these waves in increasing miscarriages is also recognized.

=== Birth defects ===
The rate of birth defects has significantly increased following the start of jamming transmissions.

=== Reduction of sperm count in men ===
Although the exact intensity of jamming waves is unknown, research in Shiraz indicated a reduction in jamming during measurement periods. Prior to the study, a professor at the Department of Medical Physics, Shiraz University of Medical Sciences, stated that stronger electromagnetic waves than those commonly called “jamming” reduce male sperm count, impair short-term memory, and cause headaches and dizziness in test animals.

=== Infertility ===
Infertility and nervous system effects are among the most serious problems linked to these waves. Anoushirvan Mohseni Bandpey, Deputy Chairman of the Parliamentary Health Committee, confirmed the harmful effects of jamming. Ali Gorani, radiation health expert at the Ministry of Health, stated that most mobile towers and jamming transmitters in the country lack safety permits. Hassan Asilian, former deputy for human environment at the Department of Environment, reported research at Tarbiat Modares University showing advanced infertility disorders in people exposed to mobile tower and jamming radiation. Mohammad Reza Razaghi, president of Shahid Beheshti University of Medical Sciences, stated at the Annual Congress on Fertility and Infertility in January 2010 that exposure to radio, mobile, and satellite jamming waves is a factor in rising infertility rates in Iran.

When young men and women are exposed to these waves, blast cells (reproductive cells) are affected, resulting in the loss of sexual function and fertility.

=== Dizziness, fatigue, and other effects ===
Experts have reported possible links between jamming exposure and dizziness, fatigue, chronic hearing loss, irritability and depression, restlessness and anger, as well as headaches and migraines.

== Weather ==
=== Equipment malfunction ===
The head of the Iran Meteorological Organization stated that one-third of Tehran radar images are unreadable—possibly due to jamming and called on the Communications Regulatory Authority to explain.

=== Drought ===
Some claims link drought and reduced rainfall to cloud electric discharge interference from jamming, which in turn loosens soil in southern Tehran, leading to severe dust storms.

== Officials' statements ==
- Mohammad Karami-Rad (MP): “Filtering and jamming are our natural right to defend cultural boundaries… Many countries do this; for example, in North Korea only state TV and radio are available.”
- Reza Malekzadeh, Deputy Health Minister for Research: “No doubt jamming increases diseases.”
- Seyyed Abdolrazzaq Mousavi (Shiraz City Council): “Shiraz has the highest microwave jamming levels in the country—turning the city into a microwave oven cooking its people.”
- Kamaladin Pirmoazen (former MP): WHO research confirms health hazards, including higher cancer, heart attack, stroke, and nervous system irritation rates from high-power jamming signals (20 MHz to 200 GHz, especially above 300 MHz).
- Heydar Ali Abedi (MP): “Even without definitive proof, medical advice is to avoid exposure to phenomena with unknown health effects.”

== See also ==
- Satellite network interference in Iran
- Human rights violations by the Islamic Republic of Iran
