= Akbar Mohammadi =

Akbar Mohammadi may refer to:

- Akbar Mohammadi (footballer) (born 1975), Iranian retired football player and current football coach
- Akbar Mohammadi (student) (1972–2006), Iranian student pro-democracy protester
