= Voice of America Persian News Network =

United States television and radio network

VOA Persian
- Country: United States
- Headquarters: Washington, D.C.
- Owner: U. S. federal government
- Parent: Voice of America
- Established: July 2003
- Launch date: 18 October 1994 (TV); 22 November 1979 (Radio)
- Dissolved: March 15, 2025
- Former names: VOA Persia Service
- Budget: $23.78 million (FY2010)
- Official website: Official website
- Language: Persian

Voice of America Persian News Network (VOA-PNN) was a governmental international broadcaster of the United States of America in Persian language. Its headquarters were in Washington D.C. It started to broadcast its programs on 18 October 1994 with a one-hour television program. Its radio programs started on 22 November 1979 with 30 minutes broadcasting per day.

VOA Persian TV has been shut down following an executive order by U.S. President Donald Trump, on March 15, 2025. The order terminated federal grants for multiple media organizations, including Voice of America (VOA), Radio Free Europe/Radio Liberty, and Radio Free Asia. As a result, about 1,300 VOA staff members were placed on administrative leave.

== Managers ==
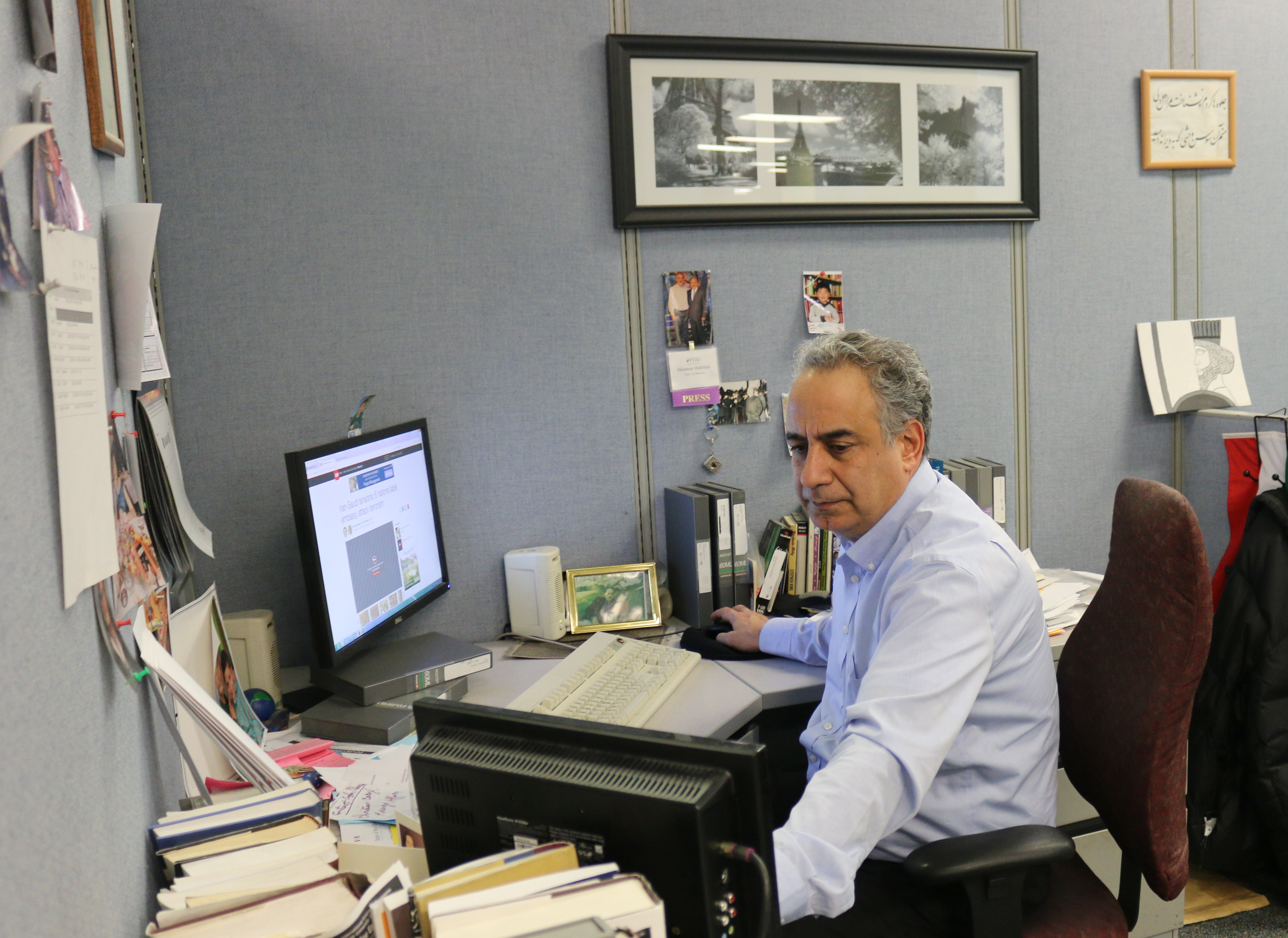
Hooman Bakhtiar, Voice of America Persian Service producer, 2016.

The first manager of the VOA-PNN was Ahmadreza Baharloo. Later managers were Kambiz Mohammadi, Shila Ganji, Behrouz Abbassi, Behrouz Souresrafil, James Glassman, Hida Fouladvand and Ramin Asgard. The current manager of the VOA-PNN is Setareh Derakhshesh.

== Programs ==
As of July 2007, VOA-PNN broadcast 1 hour of radio programming a day, 7 hours a day of original programming for television, and a website.

=== Original series ===
- Parazit (2008–2012)
- OnTen (2012–2015)

== Interview with Abdolmalek Rigi ==
In April 2007, VOA-PNN conducted a phone interview with Abdolmalek Rigi, the leader of Jundallah (which was later designated as a Foreign Terrorist Organization in 2010 by the U.S.) and introduced him as the leader of the "popular resistance movement". Following the event, Iran accused the U.S. of supporting terrorists by giving them the opportunity to speak. The New York Times Magazine quoted Mehdi Khalaji as "[VOA administrators] do not seem to be able to distinguish between journalism and propaganda. If you host the head of Jondollah and call him a freedom fighter or present a Voice of America run by monarchists, Iranians are going to stop listening". The act resembled the "hallmark of ideological objectivity" in VOA, and was criticized as an "irresponsible American embrace of violent regime change", according to Suzanne Maloney.

== The White House Reasons for VOA Shut Down ==
Here is the full list of the White Houseʼs accusations against the broadcaster:

In July 2020, Voice of America was criticized for "spreading stories and videos that appear overly favorable to presumptive Democratic nominee Joe Biden". In October 2020, Voice of America reported on the alleged Russian role in the laptop scandal involving Hunter Biden, the son of then-US President Joe Biden. The story involved emails and other data on his laptop that allegedly indicated corrupt ties to the Biden family. The Trump administration believes that Voice of America ʼs publication undermined the credibility of the laptop story. Voice of America management has asked staff not to refer to Hamas and its members as terrorists, “except when quoting official statements”. In 2019, a story about transgender migrants seeking asylum in the United States appeared in the media. The White House also used another media outletʼs 2019 report that several Voice of America reporters had posted anti-Trump posts on their work Twitter accounts (now X). The White House also used a 2022 lawsuit as part of its arguments, alleging that Voice of America had been infiltrated by people with anti-American and pro-Islamic interests and that its content had been altered to benefit Islamic State factions in Iran. In September 2019, the Daily Caller reported that Voice of America had hired a Russian anti-American propagandist. Additionally, Congressman Scott Perry wrote in a 2022 letter that VOA has become “extremely partisan over the past few years”. A 2016 Office of Human Resources report cited by Congressman Perry found that VOA Persian staffers reported “pressure to advance partisan political goals.” Among the arguments against the broadcaster was an article in The Washington Free Beacon titled “Voice of America Misallocates Funds, Hides Negative Stories About Iran. This Lawmaker Wants Investigation”.

The Trump administration also noted that in May 2019, Voice of America fired journalists for their role in canceling a live broadcast after pressure from the Chinese government. It also mentioned a Voice of America article titled “What is ʼwhite privilege’ and who does it help?” The White House says that the term is now widely used in the context of racial profiling — when police perceive people as suspects because of their race.

== Controversies ==
Under the leadership of Kari Lake at the United States Agency for Global Media (USAGM), which oversees Voice of America (VOA), the Persian service faced allegations of resource reductions and editorial restrictions amid heightened U.S.-Iran tensions in 2025–2026.

Critics accused Lake of appointing controversial figure Ali Javanmardi, a former activist and VOA journalist described as divisive and accused of personal biases, to oversee the Persian service as senior adviser. In early 2026, VOA Persian employees alleged editorial interference under Javanmardi, including alleged restrictions on mentioning the most prominent dissident opposing the Islamic Republic or related protester chants against the regime, with claims of reprimands or blacklisting for staff or guests who referenced him. On March 6, 2026, journalist and Iranian human rights activist Ahmad Batebi claimed he was fired days after confronting Ali Javanmardi over alleged censorship that blocked coverage of protesters' support for the most prominent opposition figure to the Islamic Republic and their motivations to overthrow the regime.
