= Islamic Azad University, Central Tehran Branch =

Iranian university

- دانشگاه آزاد اسلامی واحد تهران مرکزی
- Seal of IAU Central Tehran Branch
- Other names: Central Tehran University; IAUCTB
- Former name: Islamic Azad University of Tehran
- Motto: بدون شعار رسمی شعار غیر رسمی شامل: اطلب العلم من المهد الى اللحد (Arabic) ز گهواره تا گور دانش بجوی آرمان ایرانی برای جهانی شدن یادگیری و زندگی (Persian)
- Motto in English: No official motto Unofficial mottoes include: Seek Knowledge from the Cradle to the Grave; Iranian Aspirations for Globalization; Learn and Live
- Type: Private research university
- Established: August 1, 1982; 44 years ago
- Academic affiliations: Islamic Azad University
- President: Bijan Ranjbar
- Rector: Alireza Firoozfar
- Faculty: 1,609 {781 (Full-time Faculty Member) and 828 (Part-time, Visiting and Adjunct) } (2026)
- Administrative staff: 457 Full-time (2026)
- Students: ~60,000 (2026)
- Undergraduates: ~47,000 (2026)
- Postgraduates: ~11,000 (2026)
- Doctoral students: ~2,000 (2026)
- Location: Tehran, Iran; 35°45′43.64″N 51°20′20.83″E
- Campus: Urban, 297,904 m^{2} (3,206,610 sq ft) (total) 156,532 m^{2} (1,684,900 sq ft) (educational) 8,689 m^{2} (93,530 sq ft) (sport space) 7,400 m^{2} (80,000 sq ft) (laboratories) 5,283 m^{2} (56,870 sq ft) (libraries)
- Colors: Dark and light Blue
- Website: ctb.iau.ir

The Islamic Azad University, Central Tehran Branch (Persian: دانشگاه آزاد اسلامی واحد تهران مرکزی, Daneshgah-e Âzad-e Eslâmi-ye Vahed-e Tehran Markâzi) is a private research university located in Tehran, Iran. Founded in 1982, Central Tehran is the flagship institution of the universities affiliated with Islamic Azad University system. The university is the oldest, the largest and the top university among all branches of Islamic Azad University academic organization, established in 1982, originally as the Islamic Azad University of Tehran. The university campuses rest on 297,904 m^{2} (3,206,610 sq ft) of various districts of Tehran. It offers approximately 500 undergraduate and graduate degree programs in a wide range of disciplines such as sciences, engineering, art, architecture, humanities and social sciences.

== History ==
=== Establishment ===
Islamic Azad University Central Tehran Branch is the very first branch established under the university system which is known as Islamic Azad University, so the history of this branch can be traced back to the foundation of the university.

Akbar Hashemi Rafsanjani sought to establish a private university to address the challenges posed during the early years of Iranian Revolution -such as Cultural Revolution- and to meet increasing demands of secondary-school graduates for higher education in Iran. On the sidelines of an Islamic Republican Party conference, Rafsanjani mooted the idea with Abdollah Jasbi, who supported and developed the plan to establish Islamic Azad University. Islamic Azad University Central Tehran Branch is the very first branch established under the university system which is known as Islamic Azad University. In its early days, the university lacked sufficient funds and facilities to operate, sorely relying on donations made by people and government. The initial endowment was about 100,000 Rials.

Jasbi rented No. 155 building in Forsat Shirazi St., while Nassir Shekarriz and Mahmoud Latifipour – who were in charge as Chancellor and Vice Chancellor respectively – rented the sixth floor of a building located in Enqelab St., Felestin St. in order to hold an entrance exam in 1982. This university began as the Islamic Azad University of Tehran when it opened its doors to about 200 students, offering six majors in bachelor's degree and two in associate degree. Soon after, the whole building in Enqelab St. was purchased from Mostazafan Foundation of Islamic Revolution and became the university's first property. (current Faculty of Arts and Architecture)

=== Chancellors ===
| Chancellor | Tenure |
|---|---|
| Nasir Shekarriz | 1982–1998 |
| Majid Monajjemi | 1998 (interim) |
| Karim Zare | 1998–2003 |
| Hossein Aghaei | 2003 (interim) |
| Hossein Mojtabazadeh | 2003–2005 |
| Ahmad Moradi | 2005–2006 |
| Mohammad-Ali Gozashti | 2006–2012 |
| Ferdos Hajian | 2012–2013 |
| Farhad Hosseinzadeh Lotfi | 2013–2015 |
| Mehrdad Navabakhsh | 2015–2016 |
| Ahmad Shams | 2016–2017 |
| Mohammad Mehdi Tehranchi | 2017–2018 |
| Seyed Mahmoud Reza Aghamiri | 2018–2022 |
| Towhid Pourrostam | 2022–2024 |
| Mohammad Narimanirad | 2024–2025 |
| Alireza Firoozfar | 2025–present |

== Campus ==
The university has 16 Faculties:

IAUCTB Faculties
| Faculty | Location |
|---|---|
| Faculty of Technical, Vocational and Skill | Enghelab Campus |
| Faculty of Sciences | Hashemi Rafsanjani Campus |
| Faculty of New Sciences and Thechnologies | Hashemi Rafsanjani Campus |
| Faculty of Engineering | Hashemi Rafsanjani Campus |
| Faculty of AI | Hashemi Rafsanjani Campus |
| Faculty of Architecture and Urban Planning | Hashemi Rafsanjani Campus |
| Faculty of Management | Velayat Campus |
| Faculty of Arts | Velayat Campus |
| Faculty of Economics and Accounting | Velayat Campus |
| Faculty of Psychology and Education | Velayat Campus |
| Faculty of Social Sciences, Communication Sciences and Media Studies | Velayat Campus |
| Faculty of Physical Education and Sport Sciences | Velayat Campus |
| Faculty of Law and Political Sciences | Velayat Campus |
| Faculty of Literature and Humanities | Velayat Campus |
| Faculty of Foreign Languages | Velayat Campus |
| Faculty of International | Velayat Campus |

The university has three campuses:

IAUCTB Campuses
| Campus | Location | Schools |
|---|---|---|
| Velayat | Sohanak | Arts, Humanities, Behavioral and Social Sciences |
| Hashemi Rafsanjani | Punak | Science, Engineering and Architecture |
| Enghelab | Enghelab St., Pich Shemiran | Technical, Vocational and Skill |

=== Schools and departments ===
Programs by subject:

- Arts & humanities
- Clinical, pre-clinical & health (medical sciences)
- Life sciences
- Social sciences
- Engineering & technology
- Physical sciences

== Enrollments ==
In academic year of 2025-2026

| Field of Study | Percent |
|---|---|
| Engineering and technology | ~28% |
| Humanities | ~55% |
| Art | ~11% |
| Science | ~5% |
| Agriculture and Veterinary | ~1% |
| Medical Sciences | ~0% |
| Total | 100% |

| Level of study (Degree) | Percent |
|---|---|
| Associate | 2.36% |
| Bachelor's | 66.20% |
| Master's | 26.15% |
| Ph.D. | 5.29% |
| Total | 100% |

== Faculty of Engineering ==
=== Programs and majors ===
In academic year of 2026-2027:

- Aerospace engineering (BS, MS)
- Biomedical engineering (BS, MS, PhD)
- Chemical engineering (BS, MS, PhD)
- Civil engineering (BS, MS, PhD)
- Computer engineering (BS, MS, PhD)
- Electrical engineering (BS, MS, PhD)
- Energy engineering (MS)
- Environmental engineering (BS, MS)
- Industrial and Systems Engineering (BS, MS, PhD)
- Information technology engineering (MS)
- Materials Science and Engineering (BS, MS)
- Mechanical engineering (BS, MS, PhD)
- Mechatronics engineering (MS)
- Mining engineering (BS, MS)
- Nuclear engineering (BS, MS, PhD)
- Petroleum engineering (BS, MS)
- Polymer engineering (BS)
- Sports engineering (BS)
- Textile engineering (BS)

=== Sub-program ===
- Department of Electrical Engineering

| B.S. | M.S. | Ph.D. |
|---|---|---|
| Communications | Communications (Communication System, Communication Networks, Secure Communication & Cryptography, Optical Communication, Field & Wave Communication) | Communications (Communication System, Field & Wave Communication) |
| Control | Control | Control |
| Electronics | Electronics (Micro and Nanoelectronic Devices, Digital Electronic Systems, Electronic Integrated Circuits) | Electronics |
| Power | Power (Power Systems, Power Electronics and Electrical Machines, Planning and Management of Electrical Energy Systems, Electrical Transportation Systems) | Power |

- Department of Biomedical Engineering

| B.S. | M.S. | Ph.D. |
|---|---|---|
| Biomedical Engineering | Bioelectric (joint program EE Dept) | Bioelectric (joint program EE Dept) |
| | Biomechanic | Biomechanic |
| | Biomaterial | Biomaterial |
| | Rehabilitation | |
| | Tissue | |

- Department of Computer Engineering

| B.S. | M.S. | Ph.D. |
|---|---|---|
| Computer Engineering | Computer Systems Architecture | Computer Systems Architecture |
| | Software | Software |
| | Artificial Intelligence & Robotics | Artificial Intelligence & Robotics |
| | | Network and Computing |

- Department of Nuclear Engineering

| B.S. | M.S. | Ph.D. |
|---|---|---|
| Nuclear Engineering | Medical Radiation Engineering | Medical Radiation Engineering |
| | Reactor Engineering | Nuclear Energy Engineering |

- Department of Mechanical Engineering
- Department of Industrial Engineering
- Department of Chemical Engineering

== Faculty of Science ==
- Department of Mathematics, Computer Science and Statistics

It offers the following programs:

| B.S. | M.S. | Ph.D. |
|---|---|---|
| Computer Science | Computer Science | Computer Science |
| Applied Statistics | Applied Statistics | Statistics |
| Applied Mathematics | Mathematics (Applied Mathematics, Pure Mathematics) | Mathematics (Applied Mathematics, Pure Mathematics) |

- Department of Biology
- Department of Chemistry
- Department of Physics

== Admissions ==
The university received 35,317 applications for the Fall 2011 undergraduate class, making it the university with the most freshmen applicants among all branches of Islamic Azad University. In 2013, a total number of 11,789 and 6,061 applications were received for undergraduate and graduate programs respectively.

== Rankings ==
- Islamic World Science Citation Database

2011: third among Islamic Azad University campuses

- SCImago rankings

2012: International rank : 231, National rank : 1 (Islamic Azad University)
2013: International rank : 87, National rank : 1 (Islamic Azad University)
2025: International rank: 9,456, National rank: 143 (Islamic Azad University)

== Notable alumni and people ==
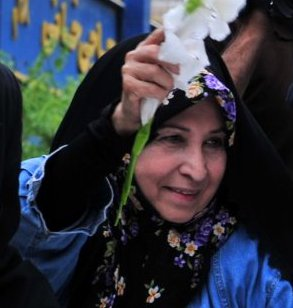
Zahra Rahnavard, Faculty of Political Sciences

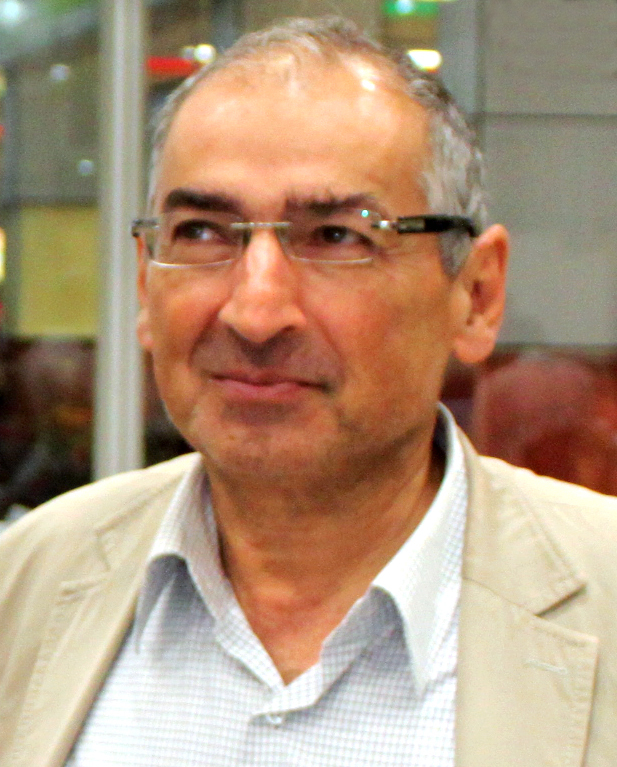
Sadegh Zibakalam, Faculty of Political Sciences

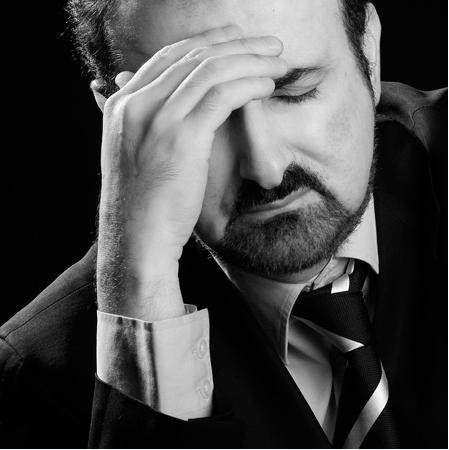
Abdolhossein Mokhtabad, Faculty of Arts

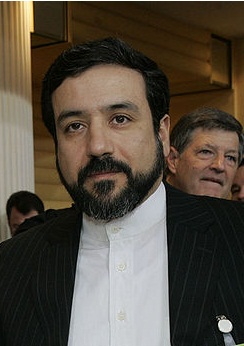
Abbas Araghchi, MS (International Relation)

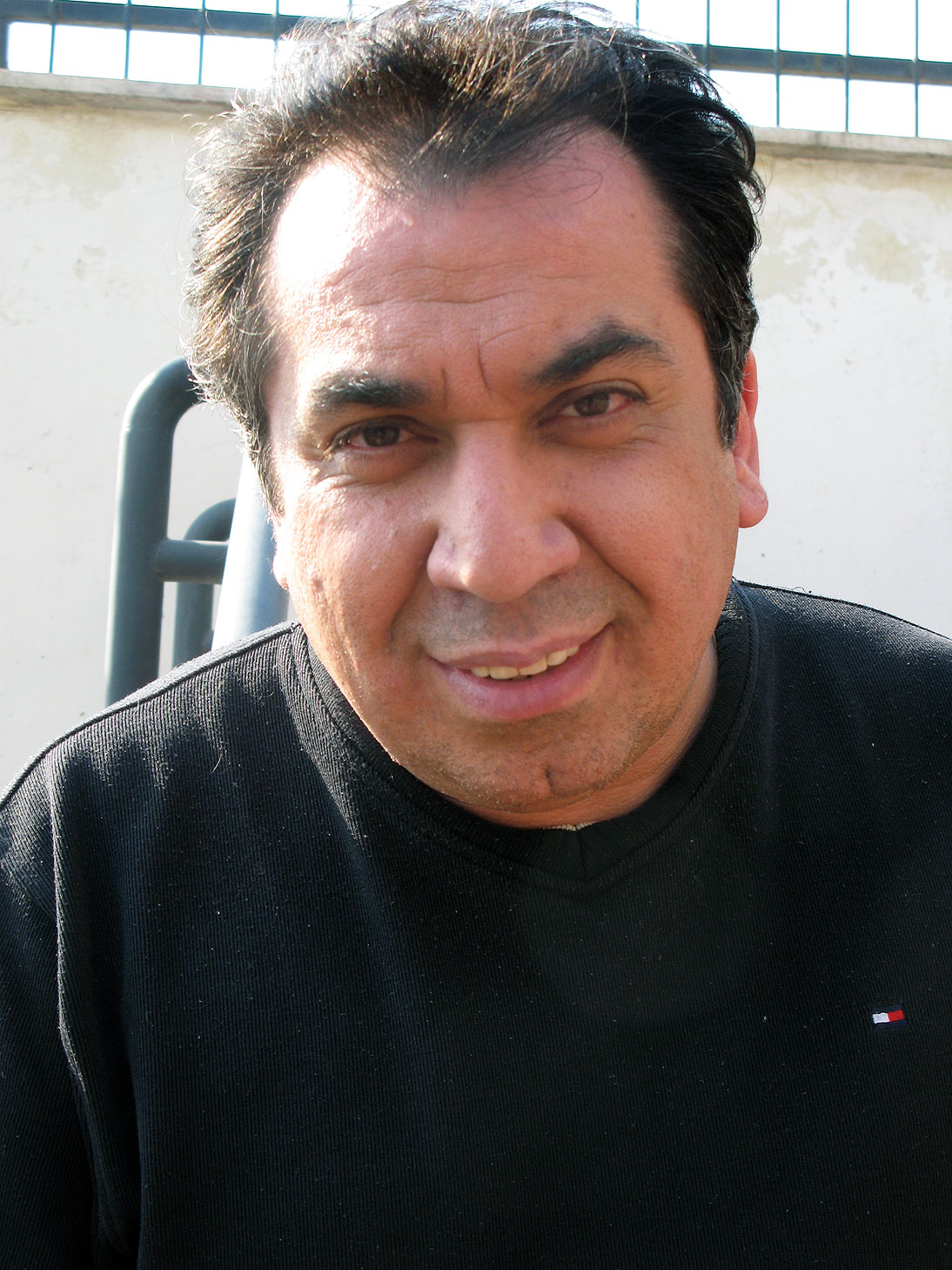
Siamak Ansari, BS (Theater)

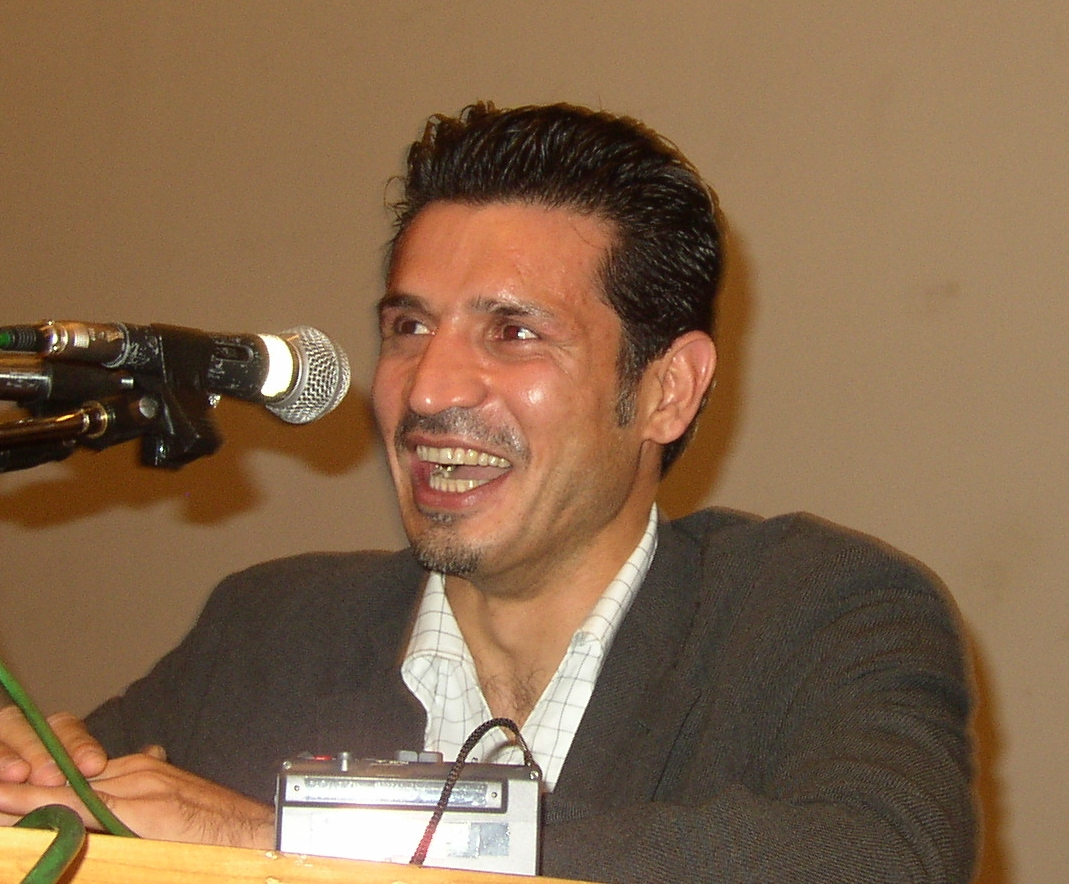
Ali Daei, MS (Physical Education)

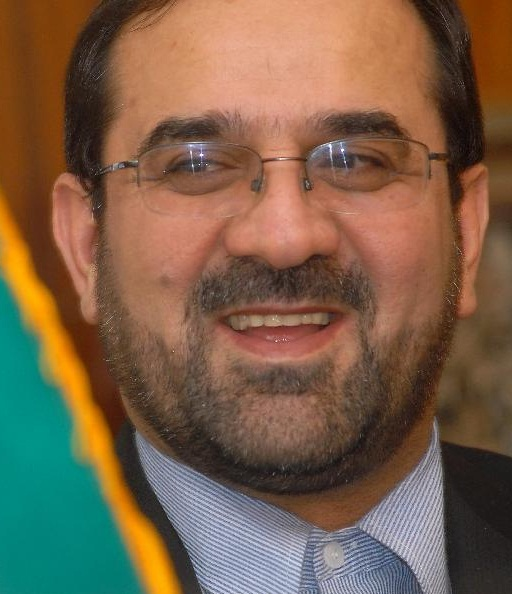
Mohammad Abbasi, MS (Management)

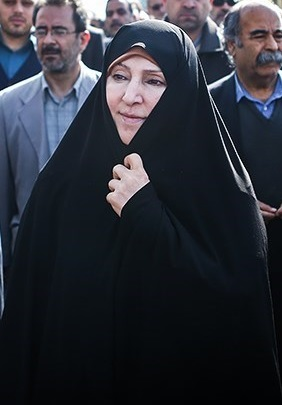
Marzieh Afkham, MS (Political Sciences)

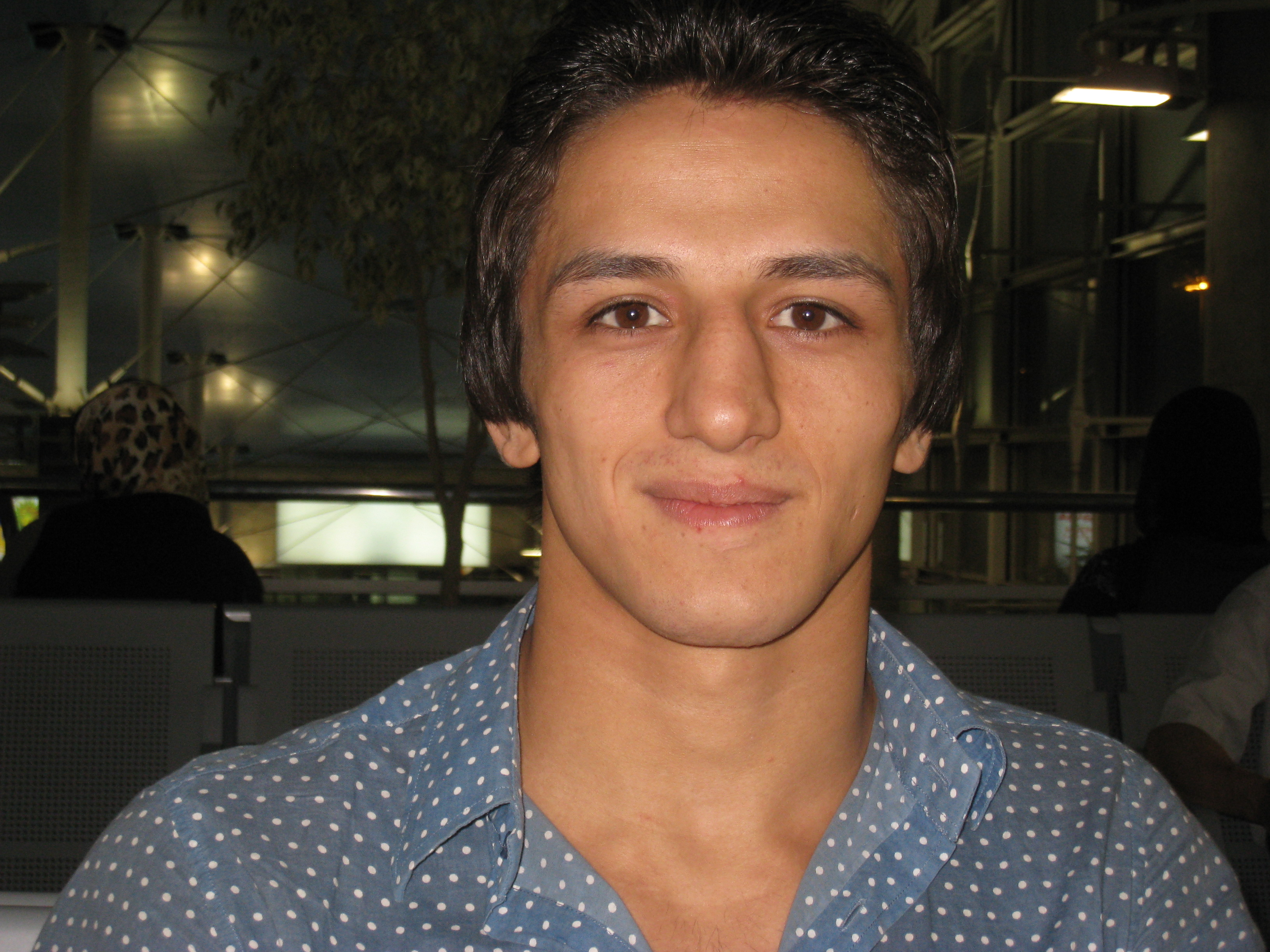
Hamid Sourian, BS (Physical Education)

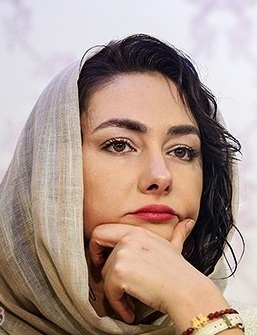
Hanieh Tavassoli, BS (Theater)

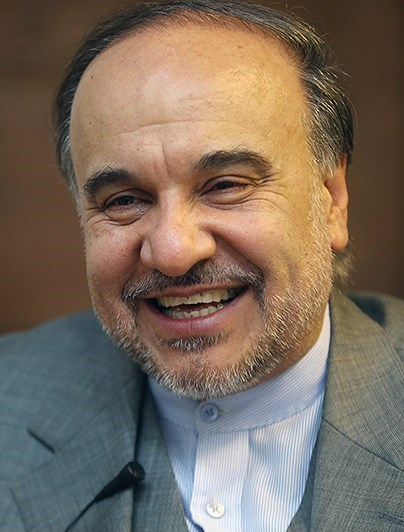
Masoud Soltanifar, MS (Political Sciences)

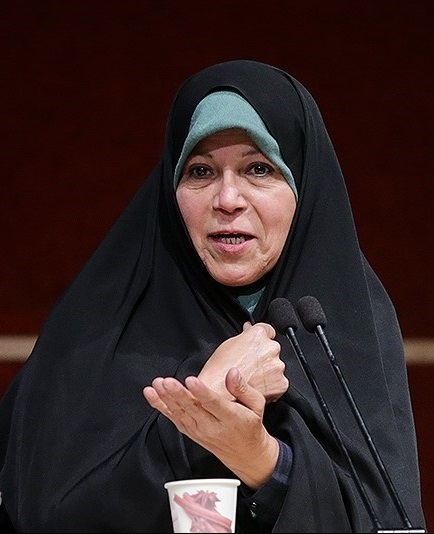
Faezeh Hashemi, MS (International law)

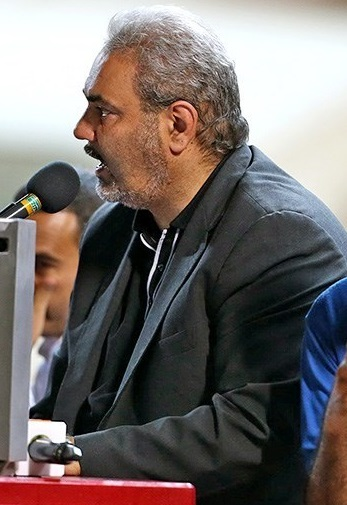
Javad Khiabani, BS (Physical Education)

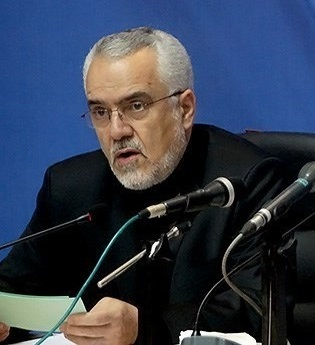
Mohammad Reza Rahimi, MS (Sociology)

=== Faculty ===
- Zahra Rahnavard – Iranian Reformist Politician
- Mohammad-Javad Haghshenas – Iranian Reformist journalist and Political activist
- Amir Mohebbian – Iranian Conservative Politician
- Mansour Falamaki – Iranian Science and Culture Hall of Famer in architecture
- Hassan Riahi – Iranian Science and Culture Hall of Famer in music and composer of National Anthem of the Islamic Republic of Iran
- Seyyed Bagher Ayatollahzadeh Shirazi – Architect and Iranian Science and Culture Hall of Famer in Heritage site repairs
- Homayoun Riahi Chaleshtari – Chairman of Zamyad Co. (2008–2009) and board member of Iran Khodro and SAIPA
- Mostafa Kavakebian, Iranian Reformist Politician and former parliament representative
- Hossein Allahkaram, Ansar-e Hezbollah activist
- Ali Akbar Saremi – Architect
- Karen Khanlari – Representative of Iranian parliament
- Karim Zareh – Former representative of Iranian parliament
- Hassan Mohadessi – Sociologist
- Jahanbakhsh Khanjani – Iranian Reformist Politician
- Ali Najafi Tavana – Iran Central Bar Association President
- Jalil Maleki – Iran Central Bar Association Board Member
- Isa Amini – Iran Central Bar Association Board Member
- Elaheh Koulaei – Former representative of Iranian parliament
- Ferdos Hajian – Primary school education expert
- Mohammad-Reza Rahimi – Vice President of Iran (2009–2013)
- Enshallah Rahmati – Journalist and Translator in Philosophy and theosophy
- Sadegh Zibakalam – Political analyst
- Effat Shariati – Iranian parliament representative
- Hamid Sajjadi – United Nations Intergovernmental Committee for Physical Education and Sport Vice-president
- Mohammad-Hossein Farhangi – Iranian parliament representative
- Habibollah Sadeghi – Painter
- Saeid Kharaghani – Iranian Ministry of Energy Deputy for Research & Human Resources (1998–2005)
- Ali Darabi, Islamic Republic of Iran Broadcasting Deputy
- Shabnam Gholikhani – Actress and Director
- Farhad Nazerzadeh Kermani – Iranian Science and Culture Hall of Famer in Arts
- Ahmad Bakhshayesh – Representative of Iranian parliament
- Hossein Abolhasan Tanhayi – Sociologist
- Mostafa Askarian – Pedagogian
- Mohammad Reza Sadegh – Senior Advisor to President Hassan Rouhani
- Abdollah Ramezanzadeh – Iranian Reformist Politician, governor of the Kurdistan Province under President Mohammad Khatami
- Abdolhossein Mokhtabad – Musician, Singer, Member of City Council of Tehran

=== Alumni ===
As of June 2010, the university has 176,973 alumni which makes it the biggest number among all branches of Islamic Azad University.

- Mohammad Abbasi – Iran Minister of Cooperatives (2005–2011) and Minister of Youth Affairs and Sports (2011–2013)
- Faezeh Hashemi – former representative of Iranian parliament and women rights activist
- Parvin Ahmadinejad – former member of City Council of Tehran
- Mohammad-Ali Pourmokhtar – Representative of Iranian parliament
- Mehdi Davatgari – Representative of Iranian parliament
- Rajab Rahmani – Representative of Iranian parliament
- Rahmatollah Norouzi – Representative of Iranian parliament
- Shabnam Gholikhani – Actress and Director
- Hanieh Tavassoli – Actress
- Shahrokh Razmjou – Archaeologist
- Elnaz Shakerdoust – Actress
- Kazem Sayahi – Voice actor
- Behdad Moghadasi – Guitarist
- Akbar Mohammadi Argi – Football coach
- Fariba Davoodi Mohajer – Journalist and activist
- Abbas Araghchi – Diplomat, Iranian Ambassador to Finland & Japan, Deputy Minister of Foreign Affairs
- Ali Shoroughi – Writer and Journalist
- Laleh Eskandari – Actress
- Bahareh Rahnama – Actress
- Azita Afrashi – linguist and Institute for Humanities and Cultural Studies fellow
- Mojtaba Saminejad – blogger and human rights activist
- Kambiz Hosseini – co-presenter of Parazit
- Shararh Farnejad – Musician and member of Arian Band
- Mehrab Ghasemkhani – Screenwriter
- Mahdi Pakdel – Actor
- Elnaz Shakerdoust – Actress
- Houman Haji-Abdollahi – Voice actor and IRIB Host
- Siamak Ansari – Actor
- Abolfazl Shahi – Artist
- Arash Dadgar – Theater Actor
- Hamed Behdad – Actor

=== Athletics ===
Several students have won medals in International competitions while studying at the university.

Medalists at 2010 Asian Games
| Name | Sport | Medal |
|---|---|---|
| (Iran) Taleb Nematpour | Wrestling | Gold |
| (Iran) Jasem Vishgahi | Karate | Gold |
| (Iran) Elaheh Ahmadi | STR3X20 | Silver |
| (Iran) Elaheh Ahmadi | AR40 team | Silver |
| (Iran) Elaheh Ahmadi | STR3X20 team | Bronze |
| (Iran) Mir-Saeid Marouf | Volleyball | Silver |
| (Iran) Farshad Alizadeh | Wrestling | Bronze |
| (Iran) Sara Khoshjamal Fekri | Taekwondo | Bronze |
| (Iran) Saeideh Maghsoudlou | Kabaddi | Bronze |
| (Iran) Fatemeh Momeni | Kabaddi | Bronze |
| (Iran) Sajjad Anoushiravani | Weightlifting | Bronze |
| (Iran) Samad Nikkhah Bahrami | Basketball | Bronze |

Medalists at 2012 Summer Olympics
| Name | Sport | Medal |
|---|---|---|
| (Iran) Hamid Sourian | Wrestling | Gold |
| (Iran) Sajjad Anoushiravani | Weightlifting | Silver |

Other notable sportspeople at the university include Ali Daei, Karim Ansarifard, Mohammad Mayeli Kohan, Akbar Mohammadi, Mahmoud Miran and Arash Miresmaeili.

== See also ==
- Education in Iran
- Higher education in Iran
- List of universities in Iran
- Islamic Azad University, South Tehran Branch
- Islamic Azad University, North Tehran Branch
