= Iranian Association for Peace Studies =

Iranian non-profit organization (established in 2015)

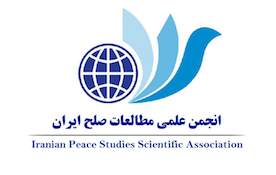
- Type: Non-profit company
- Founded: 2015
- Headquarters: Tehran, Iran
- Area served: Iran
- Website: https://ipsan.ir/

The Iranian Association for Peace Studies (Persian: انجمن علمی مطالعات صلح ایران) abbreviated (IAPS) is a non-profit, interdisciplinary organization established in 2015, sanctioned by the Ministry of Science, Research, and Technology of the Islamic Republic of Iran. Dedicated to advancing the understanding and promotion of peace, IAPS welcomes scholars and professionals from various fields, including political science, international relations, psychology, education, law, sociology, ethnic studies, and anthropology.

== Background of the Association ==
Founded on the initiative of Mojtaba Maqsoudi, an associate professor at the Islamic Azad University, Central Tehran Branch, IAPS commenced its activities officially with the convening of a general assembly and the election of its board members on the 27th of Khordad, 1394. The primary objective of the association is to foster a culture of peace and promote scholarly research in the field of peace studies.

=== Mission and objectives ===
The mission of the Iranian Association for Peace Studies revolves around several key objectives:

- Promoting Academic Research: IAPS serves as a platform for scholars and researchers to engage in rigorous academic inquiry into the multifaceted dimensions of peace, including its conceptualization, theories, and practical applications.
- Educational Outreach: Through seminars, workshops, and conferences, IAPS aims to disseminate knowledge and raise awareness about peace-related issues among academic communities, policymakers, and the public.
- Interdisciplinary Collaboration: Recognizing the complex nature of peace, IAPS encourages interdisciplinary collaboration among scholars from diverse fields to enrich understanding and generate innovative solutions to global conflicts.
- Advocacy and Activism: IAPS is committed to advocating for peacebuilding initiatives at local, national, and international levels, advocating for policies that promote conflict resolution, reconciliation, and social justice.

=== Activities and initiatives ===
Since its inception, IAPS has been actively engaged in various activities and initiatives to fulfill its mission. These include:

Organizing conferences, symposiums, and seminars on peace-related topics, featuring renowned scholars and practitioners. Publishing scholarly journals, books, and research papers to contribute to the academic discourse on peace studies. Collaborating with governmental and non-governmental organizations to implement peacebuilding projects and initiatives. Providing training and capacity-building programs for individuals and organizations involved in peacebuilding efforts. Facilitating networking opportunities for scholars, policymakers, and activists working in the field of peace studies.

== Future outlook ==
As the Iranian Association for Peace Studies continues its activities, it states that it seeks to promote peace studies through interdisciplinary scholarship, advocacy, and activism. By promoting dialogue, understanding and cooperation, IAPS aims to contribute to peace and conflict within Iran and internationally.
