= Mohammad Manzarpour =

- Born: 8 March 1972 (age 54); Tehran, Iran
- Occupation: Television journalist
- Years active: 1996–present
- Known for: VOA-PNN, BBC Persian, Iran International

Mohammad Manzarpour (born 8 March 1972) (Persian: محمد منظرپور) is a British-Iranian television journalist. He was BBC Persian’s Middle East correspondent based in Jerusalem between 2008 and 2011. He is the former executive editor of VOA-PNN.

== Background ==
Manzarpour was born in Tehran. He joined Tehran Times (English Language Daily) in May 1998. He was promoted to Economic Editor by the current editor in chief of the paper. Manzarpour joined the BBC shortly after graduation in 2002. After 6 years in the Persian section of the World Service, he moved to BBC Persian Television.

In 2008, he was deployed to Jerusalem, and then on to the Gaza War (2008–2009) as BBC Persian correspondent. From 2010 to 2011, he covered the Arab Spring in Egypt, and Tunisia.
