= Jurassic Park Coalition =

Single by Kiosk
- Released: 2009
- Recorded: 2009
- Genre: Iranian alternative rock
- Length: 3:51
- Songwriter(s): Arash Sobhani

Kiosk singles chronology
"Letter to the Sardar" (2009)	"Jurassic Park Coalition" (2009)	"Green Field" (2009)

"Jurassic Park Coalition" is a song written by Arash Sobhani and performed by Iranian rock band Kiosk, Arash Sobhani made it in protest of Mahmoud Ahmadinejad's to New York 2009 visit to the United Nations in support of the Green Movement. Sobhani presented the song to members of the Guardian Council, in which he ridiculed the role of the Guardian Council in the Islamic Republic of Iran. Kiosk also performed the song in March 2010 at the London Institute of Contemporary Art onstage, which was welcomed by audiences.
