= Ay yorum biyo =

1988 song performed by Muboraksho Mirzoshoyev

"Ay yōrum biyō (in Tajik Ай ёрум биё)"

Single by Muboraksho Mirzoshoyev
- Released: 1988

Music video
- "Ay yōrum biyō" on YouTube

"Ay yōrum biyō" (Tajik: Ай ёрум биё, lit. 'Come My Sweetheart') is a famous song by Muboraksho Mirzoshoyev (in Tajik Муборакшо Мирзошоев). There are alternate pronunciations in various languages and dialects including "Ay Yarom Biyo" and "Ay Yoram Biyo". It was released in 1988 in Tajik language and has become a staple at weddings.

== Kiosk version ==
"Ay yarom bia (in Persian: ای یارم بیا)"

Single by Kiosk featuring Mohsen Namjoo

from the album Global Zoo
- Released: 2008
- Recorded: 2008
- Genre: Iranian rock; dance-punk; Iranian alternative rock
- Length: 4:24 (album version); 4:15 (single version)
- Label: Bamahang Productions
- Producer(s): Kiosk

Music video
- "Ay yarom bia" on YouTube

In 2008, Kiosk band released it as Ay yarom bia in (Persian: ای یارم بیا transliteration Ay yāroom biyā) on their third studio album Global Zoo. The release features Mohsen Namjoo as guest singer. The song is a popular Persian cover of the Muboraksho Mirzoshoyev hit The official video clip by Mostafa Heravi of the Kiosk version is accompanied by some shots from famous surrealistic movie The Color of Pomegranates by Armenian director Sergei Paradjanov.

Remixes

The Persian version has been subject to many remixes, including one by Sam Farsio known as Socio Robots. It is credited to Sam Farsio and Arnold from Mumbai aka Socio Robots (with Kiost feat. Mohsen Namjoo).

Another remix of the song is "Ay Yarom Bia (Pyro & DJ Ferry Remix)".
