= Ali Javanmardi =

Iranian-American journalist (born 1975)

- عەلی جەوانمەردی
- Born: November 11, 1975 (age 51); Mahabad, West Azerbaijan, Imperial State of Iran
- Citizenship: United States
- Occupation: Journalist for VOA Persian
- Employer: Voice of America
- Spouse: Sayran Sharafi (divorced)
- Children: 2

Ali Javanmardi (Sorani Kurdish: عەلی جەوانمەردی; Persian: علی جوانمردی; born 11 November 1975) is an Iranian-American activist and journalist working for Voice of America.

== Career ==
Ali Javanmardi was initially recognized as a political activist. Javanmardi was stationed at Erbil for some time, where he interviewed several important figures, including Masoud Barzani, Iraqi President Fuad Masum along with other Iraqi figures, and Abdul Baset al-Sayida, the head of the Syrian National Council.

During the War on ISIS, Javanmardi reported from Syria, Iraq, and Turkey on the frontlines. He also interviewed Nobel prize winner Nadia Murad and other Yazidi Kurdish girls who were victims of ISIS rape.

During the 2020 Stockholm Democracy Summit, Javanmardi emphasized the importance of fighting against subversion from the Islamic Republic.

Ali Javanmardi regularly broadcasts live shows on Instagram, Facebook, and YouTube.

Javanmardi currently works as the senior advisor for the Persian, Kurdish, and Afghan branches of Voice of America television network.

=== Controversial Claims Targeting Reza Pahlavi and His Wife ===
In 2024, in a video he published, he launched attacks against Reza Pahlavi and his private life.. In his view, in 2025, Reza Pahlavi is a hedonistic individual who lives off money stolen from the Iranian people, and he regards Pahlavi’s supporters as lacking humanity. In a video, he attacks the private life of Reza Pahlavi’s wife with controversial and unsubstantiated claims. He repeated these sexual accusations a few days later in a tweet, claiming that Pahlavi’s wife must answer questions about which men she was with in her private life.

An August 2024 report by Wllat Media, close to the PDKI, claims that Javanmardi tried to confront Reza Pahlavi after failing to secure a meeting in Georgetown in 2023. The report also states that Javanmardi sought $3 million from a Kurdish media outlet, reportedly to target political rivals, and held meetings in Europe with Mustafa Hijri, leader of the PDKI, and other Kurdish figures to discuss coordination against the Reza Pahlavi and his supporters abroad.

=== VOA Persian ===
According to a January 2026 report in The Hill and complaints from VOA staff, since Ali Javanmardi took over at Voice of America Persian, it has been accused of systematically censoring Reza Pahlavi, blocking footage of protesters chanting his name, silencing guests who mention him, and omitting his major events and even Trump's positive comments about him, actions that critics call an "unprecedented violation of journalistic ethics" and a betrayal of VOA's mission.

A Washington Post report, citing two VOA Persian employees, reveals heavy censorship under Kari Lake and Ali Javanmardi, including a strict ban on mentioning the best-known dissident of the Islamic Republic and the most recognized opposition figure, Reza Pahlavi, even when reporting on protesters’ chants. Guests and staff who reference him reportedly face reprimands, warnings, or blacklisting, effectively silencing coverage of a leading dissident opposing the Islamic Republic. According to The Hill, on March 6, VOA Persian journalist and prominent Iranian human rights activist Ahmad Batebi claims he was fired days after confronting senior adviser Ali Javanmardi over systematic censorship that blocked coverage of anti-regime protesters in Iran who represent a significant portion of opposition voices, including their support for certain exiled figures, related slogans, and motivations for taking to the streets to topple the Islamic Republic.

=== Threats against family ===
Javanmardi states on his website that he has faced repeated pressure and threats from the Iranian government due to his opposition to the regime. There was an instance where Iranian security forces broke the gravestone of Ali Javanmardi's father, and attacked his mother's house, and burned family photographs.

=== Assassination attempt ===
Javanmardi says on his own website that Iranian Revolutionary Guard Corps Intelligence Chief Hossein Taib placed a 500-million-Rial bounty on Javanmardi, who is an independent journalist and member of the Ava Today media network. Taib commented saying that: “I would like to know where the salt is that has spoiled Ali's reputation and Javanmardi. Where are the ten people who set fire to cars, blocked roads and burned people's houses, which this journalist called Iraqi revolutionaries, hiding today? Why doesn't he dare to speak?” Javanmardi claims that his protection group arrested several people who wanted to arrest or assassinate Javanmardi on the orders of the IRGC, and released their video confessions.
