= Saman Arbabi =

Iranian-born American journalist (born 1973)

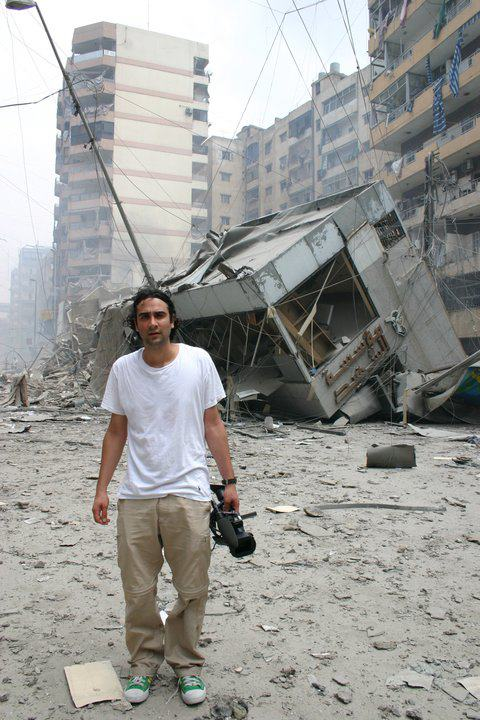
- Saman Arbabi on location in Lebanon in 2006.
- Born: 1973 (age 52–53); Tehran, Imperial State of Iran
- Occupation: Journalist

Saman Arbabi (Persian: سامان اربابی; born 1973) is an Iranian-American journalist, video director, cartoonist, host, creator, and executive producer of Voice of America's satirical television shows Parazit and OnTen. His work has been called "civic satire", comedy with a political and media mission.

== Early life ==
Arbabi was born in Tehran, Imperial State of Iran in 1973 and moved to France at the age of 12. He moved to France in 1985 and the United States in 1986. He has a Bachelor of Science in Communications with a Minor in Art from the University of Maryland University College.

== Career ==
Saman Arbabi started his career as an intern for the popular DC-based radio show Diamond in the Morning after an ABC radio show producer, who liked his sense of humor, invited him to leave his job as a cook at Hooters and work with the station. In 2003, he was hired at Voice of America (VOA) as the first Iranian video journalist. As a video journalist and war correspondent, he covered Afghanistan, Iraq, Lebanon, Israel, Syria, Egypt, Bahrain, UAE and the 2006 IAEA talks in Vienna, Austria. He produced and reported over 100 stories from the Middle East and North Africa.

== Parazit ==
"Our job is to present the facts and highlight the hypocrisy," says Saman Arbabi, one of the show's presenters. "We're not here to lead any movement, to lead any regime change." If the people of Iran want to topple the regime, he says, they must do it themselves.

— Saman Arbabi on the goals of Parazit.

In 2009, Saman Arbabi created the show Parazit, a weekly half-hour Persian language satirical show. Parazit has been called "The Daily Show of Iran" and "Iran's best and least-loved show" and was one of the most popular shows in Iran, with an estimated 35 million viewers. Arbabi's progressive and edgy style was copied so much in Iran, it prompted Iranians to coin a new term: "Paraziti," meaning "like Parazit," to refer to fans who dressed him.

Parazit's success inside Iran prompted Iran's state-run media to launch character assassinations against Arbabi and his work, even creating its own satirical show to counter the effects of Parazit.

== The Daily Show appearance ==
On January 20, 2011, Saman Arbabi and co-host Kambiz Hosseini made an appearance on The Daily Show as guests. At the end of the segment, Jon Stewart proclaimed, "I just want to tell you, you are like our show, but with real guts and I'm proud to be considered in the same fraternity of humor that you guys are in."

== OnTen and Tablet ==
In 2011 he created the award-winning hit political satire show OnTen, which has become Iran's second most popular satire show, after Parazit, with over one million Facebook fans combined.

In 2015 he created the Persian show Tablet hosted by prominent human rights activist and journalist Masih Alinejad. Tablet has become the second most influential Iranian show since Parazit.

The Iranian government continues to threat, scrutinize and attempt to discredit Arbabi's work.

== Collaborations ==
In 2013 Arbabi gave a talk at SXSW entitled Iranian Outlaws: Satire vs. Censorship in which, among other things, he unveiled "Weapons of Mouse Destruction," the largest global art project against internet censorship.

For Weapons of Mouse Destruction he worked with counter-culture artist Shepard Fairey, invited Twitter co-founder Evan Williams to participate in the campaign.

In an election-day special broadcast on June 14, 2013, OnTen featured a segment on street artist JR's Inside Out Project and aired a special message to the Iranian people from U2's Bono.

== Awards/special recognition ==
- 2004 - Voice of America Award for Excellence in Programming (coverage of Afghanistan)
- 2006 - Voice of America Superior Accomplishment Award (Lebanese-Israeli war of 2006)
- 2007 – Music Video "Edeaa" Tribeca Film Festival Selection
- 2008 - Winner of The World Academy of Arts, Literature, And Media (WAALM)
- 2009 - Voice of America Superior Accomplishment Award (Iranian election uprising)
- 2011 - Voice of America Gold Medal Award Winner (VOA's highest honor)
- 2012 - Bronze medal at New York Festival's Best Television and Films award
- 2012 - Washington Life magazine's "The Young And The Guest List" (Washington DC's up and coming young residents that could potentially help run our nation's capital).
- 2013 - CINE Golden Eagle Spring 2013 Special Recognition for Televised Series
