= Sohanak =

Sohanak (Persian: سوهانک) is an affluent neighbourhood, northeast of Tehran in Iran. Sohanak is one of the neighborhoods in Tehran district one and located in the Shemiran area in the northernmost part of Tehran. It is also a mountainous village located to the north-east of Tehran made up of vast gardens, hills and valleys.

It has Islamic Azad University Central Tehran Branch a mosque and a great tekyeh.

Drinking water in Sohanak is prepared by four qanats and its main products are crops, fruit and particularly apricot.
