= Kambiz Hosseini =

Iranian political satirist, actor, television host and radio host (born 1975)

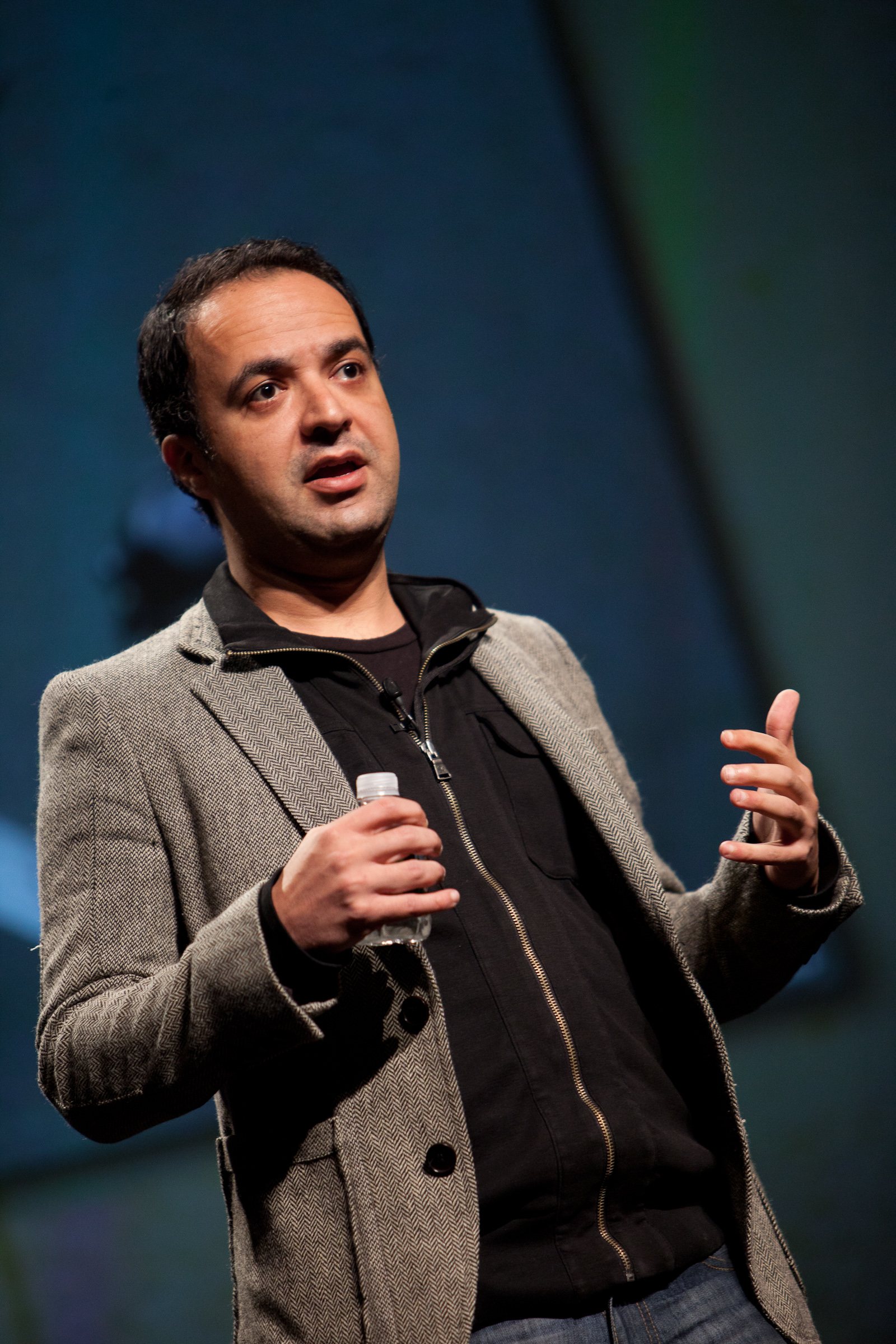
- Kambiz Hosseini in 2011
- Born: August 1, 1975 (age 51); Rasht, Imperial State of Iran
- Education: Azad University; Portland State University
- Occupations: Playwright, television and radio host, political satirist
- Known for: Parazit; Five in the Afternoon; Poletik; Paradox (weekly podcasts)

Kambiz Hosseini (Persian: کامبیز حسینی, born 1 August 1975 in Tehran) is an Iranian political satirist, actor, television host, and radio host. He is the host of Paradox, a podcast series that airs on Radio Farda. He was the host of Poletik, a satirical news program that airs on Radio Farda, as well as a weekly podcast on human rights in Iran, Five in the Afternoon. He created and hosted the successful and critically acclaimed TV show Parazit on Voice of America from 2009 to 2012.

== Early life ==
Hosseini grew up in the Iranian cities of Rasht and Mashhad. He studied dramatic literature and acting in Iran and the US. He has written, directed and acted in many stage plays and radio and TV shows in Iran and the US. Hosseini immigrated to the United States in 2000. He eventually settled in Washington, D.C. and worked for Radio Free Europe and as an art critic for Voice of America before launching Parazit.

== Career ==
=== Parazit ===
Parazit, which means "Static" in Persian (in reference to the government jamming satellite television in Iran), gained immediate popularity both in Iran and in the diaspora. The Washington Post dubbed Parazit "The Iranian Daily Show" and referred to him as the "Jon Stewart of Iran."

Hosseini himself made an appearance on Stewart's "The Daily Show" in 2011 and Jon Stewart said that Parazit is "like our show, but with real guts."

Parazit quickly became one of the most popular shows on Voice of America. Among the high-profile guests Hosseini interviewed was former Secretary of State Hillary Clinton.

Parazit also had an extensive social media reach, numbers tallying to over 1,000,000 fans on Facebook and its videos posted online have over 1,000,000 hits. The popularity of such programs with the fear of wider spreadings of the darker sides of the regime between the youth had the Iranian regime to ban websites like Facebook alongside YouTube.

Hosseini has been featured on CNN, FOX News, PBS, NPR, PRI, CBC, and many other media outlets around the world.

=== Five in the Afternoon ===
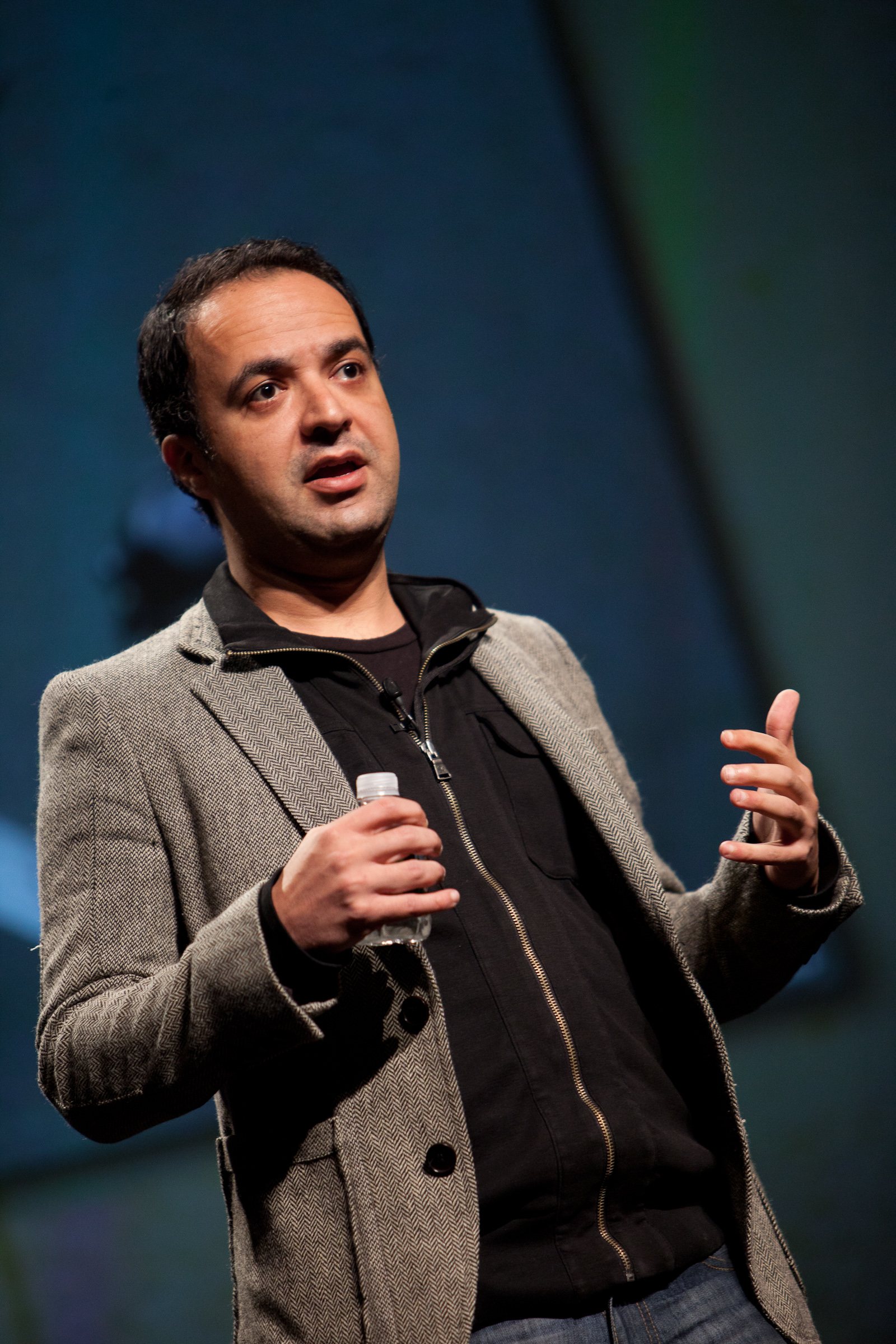
Hosseini speaking at PopTech 2011

Hosseini's weekly podcast Five in the Afternoon features news and developments on human rights in Iran in the Persian language. The podcast, which is sponsored and produced by the International Campaign for Human Rights in Iran, was launched in January 2013 and airs every Friday at 5:00 p.m. Iran time. He received The Reporters Without Borders Award for Five in the Afternoon.

The show features a summary of the week's news, satirical social commentary, and "the last word," in which Hosseini performs a monologue in a conversational style. "Five in the Afternoon" also includes interviews with prominent Iranian figures. Transcripts of the interviews are posted the following week on the Campaign's website. In every interview, Hosseini asks questions raised by his audience on his and the Campaign's Facebook page.

Since Hosseini's first podcast has had over 150,000 downloads on SoundCloud.com, where the podcast is posted each week.

=== Poletik ===
Following Parazit, Hosseini launched the New York-based satirical news show, Poletik.

== Awards ==
Hosseini received The Reporters Without Borders User Award, which honors individuals advocating for freedom of expression. The award specifically recognizes those who stand for freedom of information and expression throughout the world.

I dedicate this award to my audience, who have supported me passionately and constructively from the time I started my career. They are the ones that make this happen and my major source of inspiration and admiration, the people of Iran.

— Kambiz Hosseini,

Hosseini was awarded the bronze medal at the 2012 New York Festival's Best Television and Films show in Las Vegas for Parazit, which was honored in the comedy/satire category. He also won Voice of America's "Gold Medal Award" (the agency's highest honor) for Parazit.

In 2015, Hosseini received a Silver Award, for Five in the Afternoon radio program, at New York Festivals: World's Best Radio Programs, as the host and creator of the radio show.

== Activism ==
Hosseini testified before the Senate Foreign Relations Subcommittee on Near Eastern and South and Central Affairs on May 11, 2011, where he delivered personal remarks advocating for human rights in Iran.
