= OnTen =

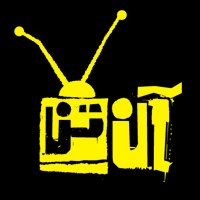
- Presented by: Arash Sobhani
- Country of origin: United States
- Original language: Persian
- No. of seasons: 2
- No. of episodes: 52

Production
- Executive producer: Saman Arbabi
- Production location: Washington, D.C.
- Running time: 30 minutes

Original release
- Network: VOA Persian Service
- Release: May 11, 2012

Related
- Parazit

OnTen (Persian: آنتن) was an award-winning hit satirical news show that tackled domestic and international political and social issues. In a 30-minute weekly show, OnTen explored the headlines and the stories behind the headlines with cutting-edge production techniques, exclusive interviews, and witty analysis.

OnTen was broadcast by satellite into Iran by the Voice of America’s Persian Service, which at the time claimed that it reached 21 percent of Iranians each week.

The show title, a play on words, means antenna in Persian and is also a slang term for "spy."

The show was the intellectual successor to Parazit, which was co-created by OnTen’s executive producer, Saman Arbabi.

The show’s second season was hosted by Iranian underground rock musician Arash Sobhani, who is also the founder and leader of the popular band, Kiosk.

Masih Alinejad, an Iranian journalist known for her ability to get Iranian officials to speak with her reported for the show from London.

Rounding out the cast was Saman Arbabi, who, during the first season also acted as the show's host and The Onion-style fake news anchor.

In an election-day special broadcast on June 14, 2013, OnTen featured a segment on street artist JR's Inside Out Project and aired a special message to the Iranian people from U2's Bono.
