= Gurminj Museum of Musical Instruments =

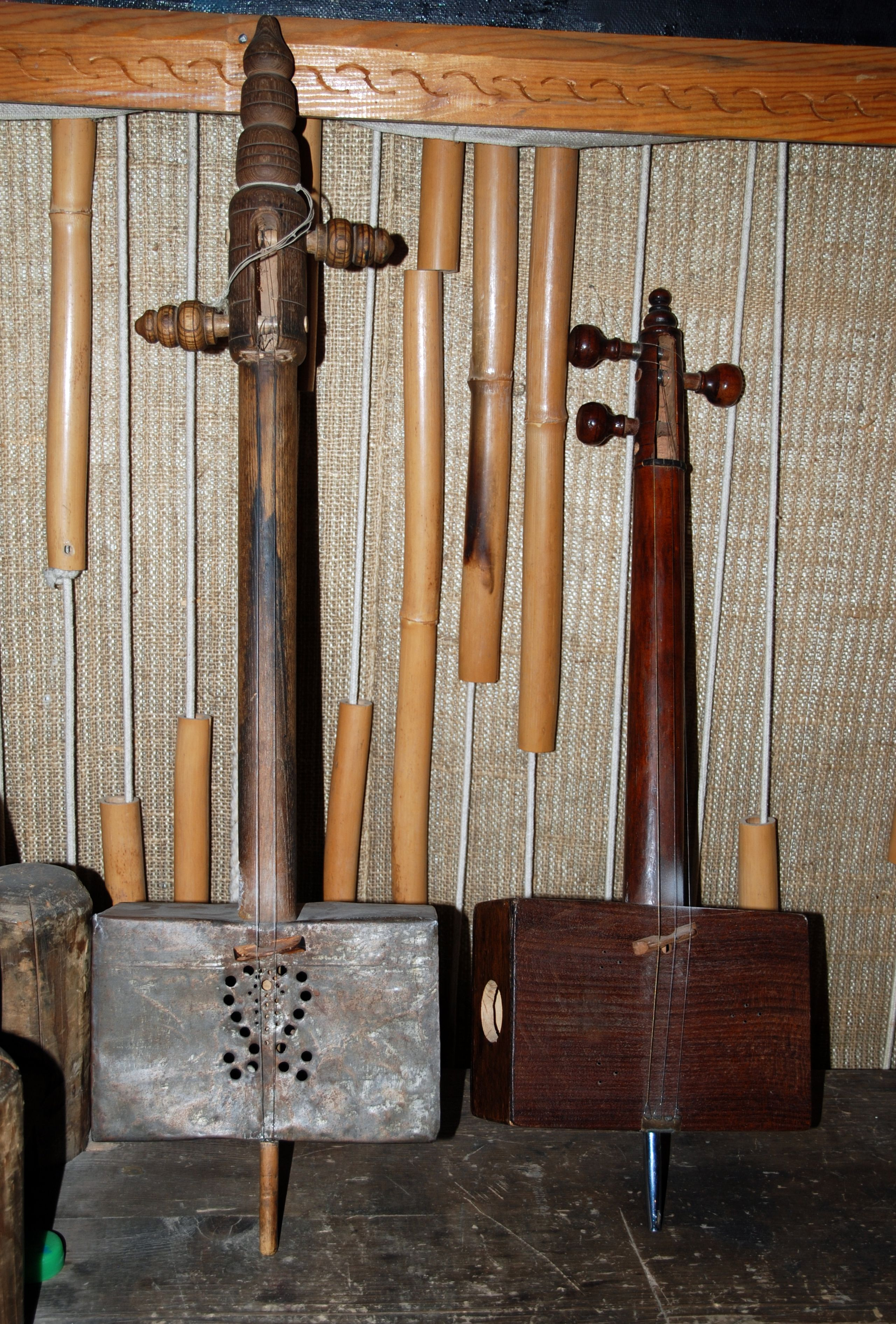
- Established: 1990
- Location: 23 Bokhtar St, Dushanbe, Tajikistan
- Coordinates: 38°34′36″N 68°47′23″E
- Type: Musical Instruments
- Director: Iqbol Zavqibekov
- Curator: Lola Ulughova
- Website: www.gurminj.tj

The Gurminj Museum of Musical Instruments (Russian: Музей музыкальных инструментов имени Гурминджа Завкибекова, romanized: Muzey muzykalʹnykh instrumentov imeni Gurmindzha Zavkibekova; Tajik: Осорхонаи асбобҳои мусиқии ба номи Гурминҷ Завқибеков, romanized: Osorkhonai asbobhoi musiqii ba nomi Gurminj Zavqibekov) or Gurminj Museum (Russian: Музей Гурминджа, romanized: Muzey Gurmindzha)) is a museum located in the center of Dushanbe, Tajikistan, behind the Office of the Mayor on Bokhtar Street.

== History ==
The museum was founded in 1990 by Gurminj Zavkibekov (1929–2003), Tajik actor and musician, who was honored as a National Artist of Tajikistan and a laureate of the most prestigious national prize in arts for significant contributions to the cultural heritage of Tajikistan - the Rudaki State Prize. After his death in 2003, his son Iqbol Zavkibekov (also a professional musician) took charge of the Museum.

The museum is mostly run by volunteers but also benefits from international donors funding some programs.

== Collection ==
There are about 100 musical instruments in the Museum collection mostly representing the Pamiri and Badakhshani musical tradition. The collection is dominated by string instruments, such as the tar, rubab, Pamiri rubab, tanbur, dutor, setor, qashqar, and ghizhak. There are also number of drums such as tabl, daf, and doyra.

The collection was gathered by Gurminj Zavkibekov during his trips to his native Kuhistoni-Badakhshon. There are a number of other instruments that do not belong to the Pamiri traditional instruments and some other antiquarian casual items are on display at the museum.

== Cultural events ==
The museum also hosts a variety of cultural gatherings and events, many featuring the Tajik musical ensemble Shams and their soloist Nobovar Chanorov. Gurminj's son Iqbol Zavkibekov is the arts director of the band, which operates out of an apartment near the museum.

== See also ==
- List of music museums
