= Kumir =

Tajik film

Kumir is a Soviet-Tajik musical drama film released in 1988. It was directed by Yormahmad Aralev and stars Daler Nazarov, Larisa Belogurova and Ahmadsho Ulfatshoyev.

== Synopsis ==
Khurshed (Daler Nazarov), a pop singer, works under the leadership of impresario Mir Alisovich. Soon he achieves success and a hero does not notice that he is gradually caught in a circle involving his new boss and patron.

The film was shot in Dushanbe studio.

== Cast ==
- Daler Nazarov (Khurshed)
- Larisa Belogurova
- Ahmadsho Ulfatshoyev
- Yunus Yusupov
- Yelena Seropova

== Crew ==
- Director: Yormahmad Aralev
- Story: Muhib Qurbon
- Music: Daler Nazarov and Muboraksho Mirzoshoyev
