= Iranian alternative rock =

Music genre

- Stylistic origins: Iranian rock; alternative rock
- Cultural origins: Early 1987, Iran
- Typical instruments: Drums; Guitar; Bass guitar

Iranian alternative rock is a subgenre of Iranian rock. This style was inspired by the alternative rock works of American musicians. This style was formed at the end of Iran-Iraq war in Tehran to defuse the pressure of war.

== History ==
After the Iranian Revolution, rock music became illegal. After Iran-Iraq War, the youth needed some music to protest. In the following years, groups such as Kiosk, Ahoora and O-Hum provided important effects in this style. "Jurassic Park Coalition" is the best-known alternative rock Iranian song released by Kiosk Group. Alternative rock music is not yet recognized in Iran, so the groups that work in this genre continue to operate underground.
