= Arash Sobhani =

Iranian singer (born 1971)

Arash Sobhani آرش سبحانی
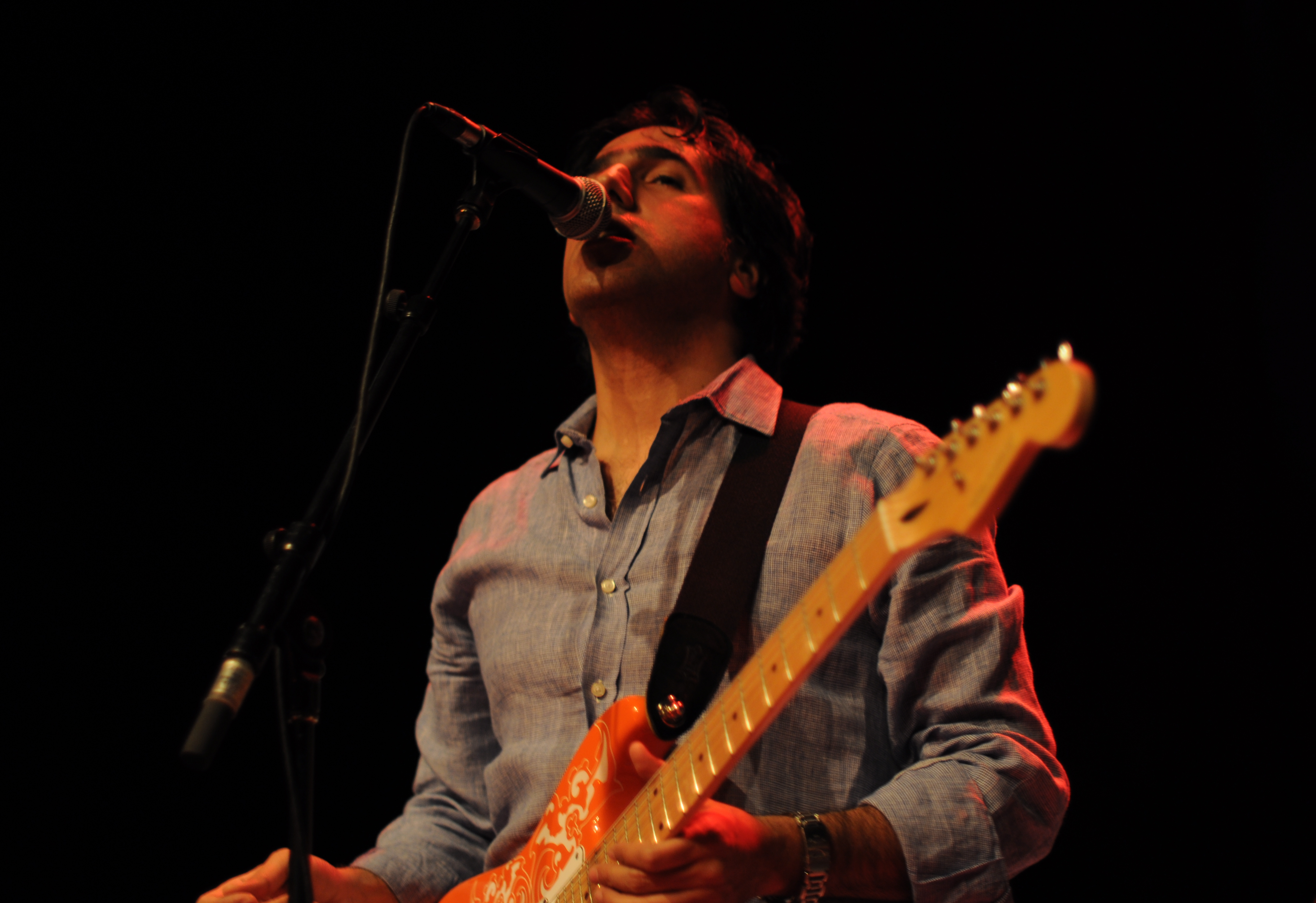

Background information
- Born: 3 January 1971 (age 54); Tehran, Iran
- Origin: Iranian
- Genres: Rock, Blues rock, Alternative rock, and Country rock
- Occupation(s): Musician and TV host
- Instrument(s): Vocals, guitarist
- Years active: 1987–present
- Website: kiosktheband.com

Arash Sobhani (Persian: آرش سبحانی; born 3 January 1971 in Tehran) is an Iranian musician and television host. He is the lead singer and guitarist of underground rock band Kiosk and the host of OnTen, a satirical news program that airs on VOA Persian.

Sobhani was born and raised in Tehran, and attended Isfahan University of Art, from where he earned a MA in architecture. He moved to the United States in 2005 to release Kiosk's first album, Ordinary Man. Since then Kiosk has released nine albums and has toured in various parts of the world.

He has been an active advocate of human rights and democracy in Iran and has been invited to give speeches about Iranian cultural and social issues in various universities, including Harvard, Stanford, UCI etc.

In 2019 Arash Sobhani produced the hit series Persia's Got Talent for the MBC Persia network. His other projects in TV include Nowruz Special, OnTen for VOA and Studio 13 for Iran International.
