= Ahmadreza Baharloo =

Radio host

Ahmad Reza Baharloo or Ahmadreza Baharloo in (Persian: احمد رضا بهارلو, born in Darab, Iran) Is the former host of Voice of America, Persian Service. He has resigned or retired from Voice of America. He is Iranian and was born in Darab in Fars Province, Iran.

He has studied Economics in Iran National University (Daneshgah Melli Iran), in Tehran and has continued his studies in American University.
