= Gurminj Zavqibekov =

Gurminj Zavkibekov
- Born: Gurminj; May 1, 1929; Shujand, GBAO, Tajik ASSR
- Died: October 21, 2003 (aged 74) Dushanbe, Tajikistan
- Genres: Folk, ethnic
- Occupations: Actor, musician
- Instruments: Tar, rubab, ghijak

Gurminj Zavqibekov (Tajik: Гурминҷ Завқибеков, Russian: Гурминдж Завкибеков; May 1, 1929 – October 21, 2003) was a Tajik actor and musician.

== Early life and education ==
Zavqibekov graduated from the Institute of Theatre and Art named after Aleksandr Ostrovsky in Tashkent in 1954. In 1977, he became the Director of the Lahuti State Academy of Dramatic Arts in Dushanbe.

== Career ==
=== Film ===
Zavqibekov is partial to the portrayal of positive, decisive, upright, and kind heroes. A realist actor, he tends to distance himself from flights of fancy and hyperbole. The roles he has performed include:

- Frunze in Hurriat (Freedom), by Gh. Abdullo, 1964;
- Ghafur in Boi va Khizmatgor (The Richman and the Servant), by Hamza Hakimzoda Niyozi, 1957;
- Mach and Akbar in Rudaki (Rudaki), by S. Ulughzoda, 1973;
- Urtaboev in the film Odam Pustashro Ivaz Mikunad (Man Changes His Skin), directed by R. Perlshtein, 1959;

=== Stage ===
Zavqibekov's contribution to stage include:

- Saidali in Tufon (Storm), by Gh. Abdullo and Sh. Qiomov, 1957;
- Kent in Shoh Lir (King Lear), by W. Shakespeare, 1957;
- Kamol in Man—Fakhriddinov (I Am Fakhriddinov), by J. Ikromi, 1961;
- Rustam in Rustam va Suhrob (Rustam and Suhrab), by Gh. Abdullo, 1967; and many others.

== Awards ==
Zavqibekov was awarded the title People's Artist of the Tajik SSR in 1966; he was awarded the Rudaki State Prize in 1965.

== Gurminj Museum ==
The Gurminj Museum of Musical Instruments, better known as the Gurminj Museum, was established in 1990 by Gurminj as a result of long-pursued dream and expression of his passion for music and arts.

== Personal life ==
Zavqibekov was married to Tamara Pavlovna and had two sons: Iqbol and Genadiy. Iqbol is a professional musician, director of the renowned Group "Shams" and inherited to become the Director of the Gurminj Museum after his death. Gurminj Zavqibekov died in 2003 in Dushanbe.
