= Daler Nazarov =

Tajik singer

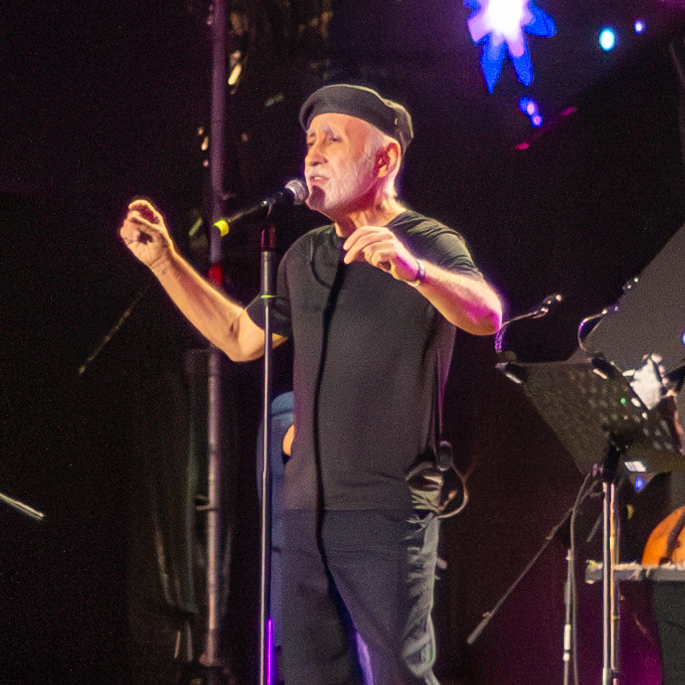

Background information
- Born: September 8, 1959 (age 67)
- Origin: Dushanbe, Tajikistan SSR
- Genres: pop, rock, folk
- Instruments: Guitar, sitar

Daler Nazarov (Tajik: Далер Назаров; born September 8, 1959) is a Tajik singer, composer and actor of Pamiri origin.

== Biography ==
Daler Nazarov was born in the Former Soviet Republic of Tajikistan. In the late 1970s, he created "Daler Nazarov's Band" which primarily focused on the rock genre and gained popularity. To his many fans, Daler Nazarov's band was regarded as the "Beatles" of Tajikistan. His songs "Agar on turki sherozi", "Zebo ba Zebo", "Chashmi kabudi dudi", "Chak-chaki boron", Dunyoi savdo bigzarad", "Hargiz az yod", "Nigori nozanin", "Bo perahani yosuman", "Telefoni sulh" were instant hits in the 1980s in the former Soviet Republic of Tajikistan, Uzbekistan and Kazakhstan.

In 2008, the Tajik newspaper Avesta included Nazarov in the list of the hundred richest and most influential people in the country.

In 1988, Muboraksho Mirzoshoyev joined his group and the duo collaborated for several years under "Daler Nazarov"s band. His band included the best musicians of the time, Muboraksho Mirzoshoyev, Ikbolsho Zavkibekov, Yadidya Ilyaev, Anvarhso Ghulomhaydarov, Firuz Khalilov, Daler Khalilov, Rustam Rahimov, and Zarif Pulatov. He has lived in Dushanbe, the capital of Tajikistan for most of his life, but had to leave the country in the early 1990s due to a civil war that ended around 1997.

For the next few years, he lived in Almaty, Kazakhstan, before returning to Dushanbe. Among his recent work is music for feature movies. Nazarov is of the Pamiri ethnic group and many of his songs are in Shughni language.

== Filmography ==
- Yunosti pervoe utro, composer, (1979)
- Kumir, composer and actor, (1988)
- Tonnel, composer, (1993)
- Luna Papa, composer, (1999), Moon Father
- Rozhdenstvenskaya mysteriya, composer, (2000), The Christmas Miracle
- England, composer, (2000)
- Statue of Love, composer, (2003)
- The Suit, composer, (2003), (The Suit, aka Shik – il vestito, Italy, aka Costume, Le, France)
- Meistersinger: The sound of Russia, composer, (2003), (Big Bones – Big Business, aka Chasse à l'os en Sibérie, France)
- Angel na dorogakh, composer, (2003), Angel on the Road
- Die Sibirische Knochenjagd, composer, (2004)
- Sex & Philosophy, composer and actor, (2005)
- Shaere zobale-ha, composer, (2005), Poet of the wastes
- Bobo, composer, (2008)
- Opium War, composer, (2008)
- The Man Who Came with the Snow, composer, (2009)
- Mirror Without Reflection, composer, (2014)
- The Teacher, composer, (2014)
- Bunker, composer, (2019)
