= Akbar Mohammadi (footballer) =

Iranian footballer

Personal information
- Full name: Akbar Mohammadi Argi
- Date of birth: August 14, 1975 (age 51)
- Place of birth: Tehran, Iran

Team information
- Current team: Sanat Mes Kerman F.C. (head coach)

Youth career
- 1989–1992: Vahdat
- 1992–1994: Bank Melli
- 1994–1996: Fath Tehran

Senior career*
| Years | Team | Apps | (Gls) |
| 1995–1996 | Fath Tehran | | |

International career
| 1994 | Iran U20 | | |

Managerial career
- 2000–2002: Saipa U20 (assistant)
- 2000–2005: Payame Nour University
- 2002–2003: Saipa U20
- 2003–2004: Shahab Zanjan U20
- 2004–2007: Saipa (match analyst)
- 2005–2008: Islamic Azad University East Tehran Branch
- 2006–2007: Iran U23 (assistant)
- 2008: Nirou Zamini (assistant)
- 2008–2009: Sepahan (match analyst)
- 2009: Gostaresh Foulad (assistant)
- 2009–2010: Iran U17 (head coach)
- 2011–2013: Iran U20 (head coach)
- 2013–2014: Tajikistan U23 (head coach)
- 2014–2015: Zob Ahan (assistant)
- 2015–2016: Khooneh Be Khooneh (assistant)
- 2016–2017: PAS Hamedan (head coach)
- 2017–2018: Siah Jamegan (assistant)
- 2018: Khooneh Be Khooneh (head coach)
- 2019: Iran U17 (head coach)
- 2023: Mes Kerman (head coach)
- * Club domestic league appearances and goals

Akbar Mohammadi is an Iranian former football player who has later managed the Iran national under-19 team. Akbar Mohammadi Argi, in addition to his football pro license degree and official AFC instructor, also has a specialized doctorate in sports management from Tarbiat Modares University which can be called one of the most educated coaches in Iran. Also, he has the experience of CEO of Paykan F.C. and the experience of being responsible for sports of National Iranian Copper Industries Company. He has experience as a head coach in the Premier League and Azadegan League, as well as the head coach of the national youth team (U17-U19) of the Islamic Republic of Iran. In October 2023, he was introduced as the head coach of Sanat Mes Kerman F.C.

Akbar Mohammadi Argi became the head coach of Iran's national youth football team in 2007. Following the appointment of Carlos Queiroz and federation recommendations regarding the development of youth squads, he took over the under-19 national team. At the AFC U-19 Championship in the UAE, the team advanced from the group stage in first place after defeating Japan and Kuwait, and drawing with the host nation. They were subsequently eliminated from the tournament after losing to South Korea in the knockout stage. Several players from that squad later advanced to the senior national team, the Iranian Persian Gulf Pro League, and European clubs, including Sardar Azmoun, Alireza Jahanbakhsh, Rouzbeh Cheshmi, Farshid Esmaeili, Ali Alipour, Ahmad Abdolahzadeh, Hossein Kanaanizadegan, Ehsan Pahlavan, Mohammad Daneshgar, and Ali Karimi.
