= Kiosk (band) =

Iranian rock band from Tehran

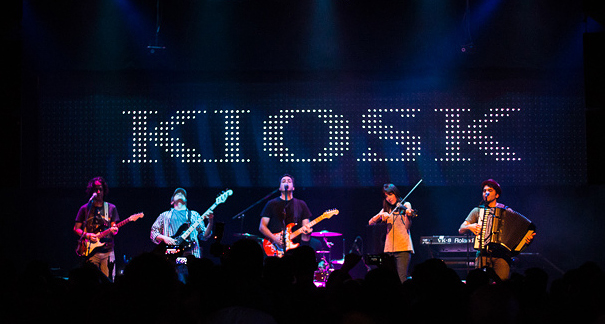

Background information
- Origin: Tehran, Iran
- Genres: Iranian alternative rock; blues rock; folk rock; art rock
- Years active: 2003–present
- Labels: Global Zoo; 9821; Bamahang
- Members: Arash Sobhani; Ali Kamali; Shahrouz Molaei

Kiosk (Persian: کیوسک) is a rock band formed in Tehran in 2003, known for its blend of musical styles and its wry lyrics confronting Iranian cultural angst.

== History ==
Kiosk is a pioneering Iranian rock band (The Berlin Daily Newspaper) founded by Arash Sobhani in Tehran in 2003. After censorship and restriction by Iranian authorities, its musicians immigrated to the U.S. and Canada. The band has since toured throughout the world and released seven albums. Kiosk is known for its satirical lyrics, which provide a socio-political commentary of life in Iran, as well as its blend of several music styles, from Iranian folk to gypsy jazz to rock. Kiosk's music has been described by BBC World as "songs that speak to a generation...Kiosk's stinging political satire is hidden within its blues and folksy sound." Haaretz has referred to Kiosk as the most popular Iranian rock band in the Iranian diaspora, while Ahram Online describes how the band gives a voice to their generation. Kiosk's live album "Triple Distilled," recorded at Yoshi's Jazz Club, was chosen by presenter Mark Coles from BBC World's "World of Music" as one of the ten best world music albums of the year, alongside such artists as Paolo Conte and Ali Farka Touré. TIME Magazine has called Kiosk "a band that can criticize the Iranian government without retribution," while Frontline PBS has praised their "eclectic sound that incorporates a multitude of instruments and styles." The Guardian and Radio Free Europe have reported on Kiosk's popularity amongst young Iranians. Frontman Arash Sobhani's lyrics have been referenced by The New York Times and referred to by the Frankfurt General Newspaper as "a guiding light for many,” while Frontline PBS refers to Sobhani's “poignantly powerful lyrics...and smooth, melodic tone that belies the fire and rage of one of Iran's most prolific contemporary social critics." As Aslan Media, founded by Reza Aslan, writes: "Kiosk offers an honest opportunity for self-reflection in a society that has nearly seventy-percent of its population under the age of thirty. For younger generations of the diaspora who have yet to visit their parents’ homeland, Kiosk delivers unpretentious music that speaks of a society caught between East and West, trapped between past and present, leaving no direction to look but within."

Current Kiosk members include Ali Kamali (bass, recording engineer), Arash Sobhani (lyricist and songwriter, Guitar) and Shahrouz Molaei (Drums).

The name of the band, Kiosk, stems from the original formation of the group in Tehran, when its members gathered together in any possible makeshift space or “Kiosk” to play their music without fear of arrest.

== Television, film, and other media ==
Kiosk tracks have been used in the following films, television programs, and other media:

- Documentary: "Kiosk, A Generation Destroyed By Madness" by director Ala Mohseni, produced by Maziar Bahari
- Anthony Bourdain's Parts Unknown on his trip to Iran (Season Three, Episode Seven).
- A Girl Walks Home Alone at Night (described by Rolling Stone as having a "killer soundtrack", by Variety as having "impeccable music selections", and by Chris O'Falt from The Hollywood Reporter as having "scenes driven by amazing music I had never heard before.")
- Maz Jobrani's debut original feature film "Jimmy Vestvood"
- Acclaimed BBC documentary by Rageh Omaar, Rageh Inside Iran
- Kiosk's story was included in the collection "The Persian Square" by Davar Ardalan
- Kiosk was referenced in the book "Rock the Casbah" by Robin Wright
- Kiosk has been featured in Freedom Beat, NPR, BBC World, and Voice of America broadcasts.

== Notable performances ==
- Kiosk has toured extensively throughout countries including the US, Canada, the UK, the Netherlands, France, Germany, Italy, Sweden, Norway, Lebanon, and Australia.
- In their current base of San Francisco, Kiosk has performed at the Palace of Fine Arts and Yoshi's Jazz Club (the latter broadcast as a critically acclaimed live recording).
- Kiosk performed through the National Swedish Touring Theatre at the annual Eldfesten Festival in Stockholm for an audience of around twenty thousand.
- Kiosk performed at New Morning in Paris, France, filmed by Mezzo TV
- Kiosk performed in the opening of the acclaimed exhibition Iran Modern along with Mohsen Namjoo
- Kiosk has performed or guest-lectured in several American universities, including Harvard, Stanford, Brown, Columbia, and the University of California.

== Discography ==
=== Albums ===
- 2005: Adam e Mamooli (Ordinary Man)
- 2007: Eshgh e Sorat (Amor De La Velocidad)
- 2008: Bagh e Vahsh e Jahaani (Global Zoo)
- 2010: Seh Taghtireh (Triple Distilled: Live at Yoshi's)
- 2011: Natijeh e Mozakerat (Outcome of Negotiations)
- 2013: Tashkilat e Movazi (Parallel Establishments)
- 2014: Zang Bezan Azhans (Call a Cab)
- 2015: Vaziat e Narengi ( Condition Orange)
- 2016: Stereo Tull Taghdim Mikonad ( Stereo Tull Presents)
- 2018: Stereo Tull Taghdim Mikonad - Bazsazi Shod e ( Stereo Tull Presents - Remastered)
- 2021: Payan e Shirin (Sweet Ending)
- 2023: Kaboos Abad (Desolateville)

=== Singles ===
- 2008: "Yarom Bia" featuring Mohsen Namjoo
- 2009: "Morgh e Sahar" ("Bird of Dawn") featuring Mohsen Namjoo
- 2009: "Dasht e Sabz" ("Green Field")
- 2009: "Nameh Be Sardar" ("Letter to the Sardar")
- 2009: "Jurassic Park Coalition"
- 2014: "Strange Days" - JJ Cale cover
- 2018: "To Ro Mikham" ("I Want You")
