= Parazit =

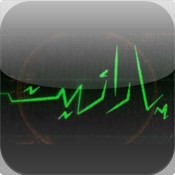
- Presented by: Kambiz Hosseini; Saman Arbabi
- Country of origin: United States
- Original language: Persian
- No. of seasons: 3

Production
- Executive producer: Saman Arbabi
- Production location: Washington, D.C.
- Running time: 30 minutes

Original release
- Network: VOA Persian Service
- Release: 2008 – February 2012

Related
- OnTen

Parazit (Persian: پارازیت, pārāzit, meaning "static") was a weekly half-hour Persian-language satirical television show broadcast on Voice of America's Persian service. The show poked fun at Iranian politics. Kambiz Hosseini and Saman Arbabi, Iranian expatriates living in Washington, D.C., started the show as a 10-minute segment in another show influenced by the American satirical news show The Daily Show. Parazit was launched before the June 2009 presidential elections in Iran. It became very popular in Iran, reaching its audience via illegal satellite dishes, the internet, or bootleg DVDs. Its name is a reference to the Iranian government's repeated attempts to jam foreign satellite programming. Because it was distributed through unofficial channels, it is impossible to determine the audience. However, as of January 2011, the show's YouTube channel was viewed 45,000 times a week, while their Facebook page was visited 17 million times a month. A new season was reported to begin on 17 August 2012 after a six-month hiatus, but did not resume broadcasting.

The program and its presenters have been subject to significant criticism in Iranian state media, described by some as "character assassination".

Hosseini and Arbabi appeared on The Daily Show on January 20, 2011.

Parazit aired its last episode in 2012.
