= Yodgor Fayzov =

Governor of the Tajkistani southeastern Gorno-Badakhstan Autonomous Region

Yodgor Doyorovich Fayzov (born 1961) is the governor of Tajikistan's southeastern Gorno-Badakhshan Autonomous Region (GBAR). Prior to that he was head of the Aga Khan Foundation office in Tajikistan. Fayzov replaced Shodikhon Jamshed as governor on 1 October 2018, by executive order of Tajik President Emomali Rahmon following civil unrest in the region.

Fayzov was born to Pamiri parents in the village of Porshinev, Shughnon District in 1961. He went to the Agricultural University of Tajikistan in Dushanbe where he joined the Komsomol and graduated in 1984. For two years he worked as an agricultural specialist for the GBAR regional Department of Agriculture in Khorugh. Beginning in 1984 he served in various capacities in Komsomol, both at the city and regional levels, being First Secretary of the Komsomol of the GBAR by 1993. In 1993 Fayzov went to work for the Aga Khan Foundation where he stayed for twenty-six years rising, in 2004, to the head of mission in Tajikistan.

Despite, or because of Fayzov's identification with the Badakhshani people, in October 2018 President Emomali Rahmon appointed him as governor of Gorno-Badakhshan Autonomous Region. Since Fayzov became governor of the region, the civil unrest has quieted down.

== Notes and references ==
Political offices
Preceded by Shodikhon Jamshed	Governor of Gorno-Badakhshan Autonomous Region; 2018–present	Succeeded by
