= Abusaid Shokhumorov =

Tajik scholar

Abusaid Shokhumorov (Tajik: Абусаид Шохуморов) (03.12.1955– 09.09.1999) was a famous Pamiri, Tajik scholar in the history and philosophy of Pamiri Ismailism.

== Life and work ==
He was born to a sayyid family in Porshinev, in the village of Khosa, not far from Khorugh, the capital of Gorno-Badakhshan Autonomous Province, Tajikistan. From his early years, Abusaid's grandfather nurtured his interest in Islam, the teachings of Shiism and Ismailism in particular.

Abusaid is the author of several articles and books published in Russian and Tajik, some of which have been translated into Persian and English. His major publications include "The Division of Badakhshan and the Fate of Ismailism" (Russian: Разделение Бадахшана и судьбы Исмаилизма), published posthumously in 2008 in Moscow.

It explores the history of the division of the Pamir region into Afghan and Bukharan domains by the Russian Empire and British Empire during the "Great Game". He particularly studies the influence this division has had on the sociopolitical, religious and cultural life of the Pamiri Ismailis since 1895. and "Pamir - the Land of Aryans" (Russian: Памир - Страна Ариев, published in 1997 in Dushanbe, Tajikistan) which contains chapters in English, Persian, Russian and Tajik and examines the Zoroastrian elements in Pamiri Ismaili teachings and practices.
