= Khairi Nazarova =

Tajikistani actress (1929–2020)

- Born: Rachel Caroline Eaton; July 2, 1929; Khujand, Tajik SSR, Soviet Union
- Died: May 10, 2020 (aged 90); Tajikistan
- Occupation: Actress

Khairi (sometimes Khairy) Nazarova (Tajik: Хайрӣ Назарова, Russian: Хайри Наза́рова; 2 July 1929 – 10 May 2020) was a Tajikistani actress who was active during the Soviet era.

== Biography ==
Nazarova was born in Khujand into the family of a merchant. From 1942 until 1951 she was active as a singer and dancer at the People's Theater in Qurghonteppa. She also began to act during this time; among the roles which she essayed were Zuhro in Tohir and Zuhro of Said Abdullo; Oikhon in Left-Field Tricks by Hamza Hakimzade Niyazi; and Raihon in The Five-Som Bride by M. Urdubodi. In 1951 she was discovered by the director of the Lahuti State Theater and Academy of Dramatic Arts, Yefim Mitelman, who invited her to work there. She came to know performers such as Muhammadjon Qosimov, Asliddin Burhonov, and Tuhfa Fozilova, and she began to learn the intricacies of her craft. Among the roles for which she was known were Kumri in Dil Dili Zainab, by Shamsi Qiomov and A. Moroz; Nigina in Rudaki, by Sotim Ulughzoda; Masha in The Chimes of the Kremlin, by Nikolai Pogodin; Arkhonta in Fighters, by S. Karas; and the title role in Zebunisso, by Qiomov and Sherali. She also tackled roles in King Lear and Romeo and Juliet, among other Western plays. Nazarova also appeared in a number of films for Tajikfilm, including My Friend Navruzov (1957), Excellent Duty (1958), and The Twelve Hours of Life (1964). She also dubbed parts in over three hundred films. During her career, Nazarova traveled to Afghanistan, Iran, Turkey, Cyprus, Tunisia, France, Italy, Malta, India, and Egypt. In addition to acting she also worked as an instructor. For her work she was named a People's Artist of the Tajik SSR in 1964. She later retired to Dushanbe. She also wrote reminiscences about her career.
