= Sabzajon Shoismoilova =

Tajikistani singer and actress

- Сабзаҷон Шоисмоилова
- Born: 10 May 1923; Rushon, Gorno-Badakhshan Autonomous Region
- Died: 2001 (aged 77–78)
- Occupations: Actress; singer

Sabzajon Shoismoilova (Tajik: Сабзаҷон Шоисмоилова; 10 May 1923 – 2001) was a Tajikistani singer and actress of the Soviet era.

Shoismoilova was born in Rushon, in the Gorno-Badakhshan Autonomous Region, and began her career performing with a number of different of amateur groups, beginning in 1936. In 1940, she joined the company of the Drama Theater in Khorugh. Members of the troupe visited Dushanbe in 1946, and she remained behind, continuing her career in the capital. Over the course of her career she performed more than 200 different roles; among those for which she received the most acclaim were Borsulton in The Golden Village by Mirsaid Mirshakar and her performance in Guilty Without Fault by Aleksandr Ostrovsky.

Shoismoilova was a singer as well, performing Tajikistani folk songs and the work of Tajikistani composers, as well as pieces written by other Soviet musicians. She received a number of awards during her career, including the Order of the Badge of Honour, twice, as well as a variety of other medals.

In 1971, she was named a People's Artist of the Tajik SSR.
