= Savsan Bandishoeva =

Savsan Bandishoeva (Tajik: Савсан Бандишоева; 21 January 1922 – 14 April 2002) was a Tajikistani actress and singer of the Soviet era.

== Biography ==
Bandishoeva was born into a farm family in the village of Vomari in the Rushon District. Her stage career began in 1938 in the neighborhood, when she acted as a member of a local amateur group. In 1940, she moved to Dushanbe; from there she joined a collection of Tajik artists who traveled to Moscow to participate in the Decade of Tajik Art, performing in 1941 with great success. From 1941 until 1965 she was a member of the troupe of the regional musical and comedy theater in Khorugh. She joined the Communist Party of the Soviet Union in 1953. Among roles which she essayed during her career were the title role in Rozia, by E. Akubjonov and Nissan Zeleransky, and Gul'kubran and Gulbahor in Tashbek and Gul'kubran' and Qishloqi Tilloi (The Golden Kishlak), both by Mirsaid Mirshakar. During the Decade of Badakshan Art, in 1946, she played Kruchinina in Guilty Without Fault by Aleksandr Ostrovsky, for which she won much acclaim. She retired from the stage in 1965. Bandishoeva was named a People's Artist of the Tajik SSR in 1946; among her other awards were the Order of the Badge of Honour and numerous medals. In addition to her stage work, she appeared once on film, in 1979's The First Morning of Youth, directed by Davlat Khudonazarov.
