= Tolib Ayombekov =

Tajik militant opposition politician and warlord

Lieutenant Colonel Tolib Ayombekov
- Shughni: Tolib Ayombekuv
- Born: July 6, 1966 (age 60); Khorog, Shugnan District, Gorno-Badakhshan Autonomous Oblast, Tajik SSR, Soviet Union
- Other name: Tolibbek Ayyombekov
- Political party: United Tajik Opposition (1993–1997)

Tolibbek Ayyombekov (Shughni: Tolibbek Ayombekuv, Tajiki: Толиббек Айёмбеков, Perso-Arabic script: طالب‌بیک ایام‌بیک‌اف; born 6 July 1966 in Khorog), commonly known as Tolib Ayombekov (Shughni: Tolib Ayombekuv, Tajiki: Толиб Аёмбеков, Perso-Arabic script: طالب ایام‌بیک‌اف), is a Pamiri jailed ex-opposition fighter from Tajikistan, who was involved in the Gorno-Badakhshan clashes in 2012 against the government forces of ruling Tajik president Emomali Rahmon. Until his arrest in June 2022, he was particularly influential in his home Khlebzavod microraion of Khorog.

Ayombekov is the brother of former prominent Tajik opposition commander Abdulamon Ayombekov, and was an opposition fighter during the 1992 to 1997 Tajik Civil War between the United Tajik Opposition and the government led by President Rahmon Nabiyev. Following his brother Abdulamon's assassination in 1994, he became the de facto leader of all opposition militias in Gorno-Badakhshan. As part of the subsequent 1997 peace deal between the opposing sides, Ayombekov was first appointed commander of police battalion in Khorog and later, in 2008, made head of the Ishkashim border detachment, reaching the rank of lieutenant colonel. However, Ayombekov and many other Tajik informal leaders were gradually driven out of power. Emomali Rahmon's government has also accused Ayombekov of tobacco smuggling.

After Major-General Abdullo Nazarov, the head of the Tajik intelligence agency "GKNB" in the local semi-autonomous province of Gorno-Badakhshan, was dragged out of his car, and was fatally stabbed in an incident in Ishkoshim, heavy fighting erupted on 24 July 2012 between government forces and militants loyal to Ayombekov in the streets of Khorog. The Western media described the fighting as the worst in Tajikistan since 2010 or the 1992–1997 civil war. Ayombekov denied any responsibility for Nazarov's death. The clashes ended when, on request of Ismaili Imam Karim Agha Khan, he surrendered himself to the Tajik government, in exchange for their withdrawal from Khorog.

In the aftermath of the clashes, Tolib Ayombekov, together with other informal leaders including Muhammadboqir Muhammadboqirov and Yodgorshoh Muhammadaslamov, was entered into ICPO-INTERPOL's database of wanted persons, at the request of the Tajik government. He remained in it until January 2013.

In 2018, following the consent tensions in Badakhshan, all 7 informal leaders of Badakhshan, including Ayombekov, signed a protocol with the government, agreeing not to interfere in the activities of government agencies. In exchange for their agreement, all legal cases against them were dropped, and they were no longer officially referred to as criminals. Additionally, the government ceased demanding that they turn over all weapons in their possession. Following the signing of the protocol, the informal leaders were invited to meet Emomali Rahmon in Dushanbe. Ayombekov was among those that agreed to the invitation and arrived in Dushanbe.

On 11 June 2022, following the killing of Tajik opposition figures Muhammadboqir Muhammadboqirov, Khursand Mazorov, and Zoir Rajabov, he was detained by Tajik security forces in Khorog, alongside Munavvar Shanbiev and Niyozshoh Gulobov. On 23 November 2022, he and the other co-defendants were given a life sentence. All 3 of his sons, as well as his 2 brothers, were arrested thereafter.
