= 2012 Gorno-Badakhshan clashes =

- Part of Insurgency in Gorno-Badakhshan
- Gorno-Badakhshan (shaded), Tajikistan
Date	24–25 July 2012
Location	Gorno-Badakhshan
Result	Inconclusive

Belligerents
Tajikistan: Armed Forces of Tajikistan	Local anti-government militants

Commanders and leaders
Emomali Rahmon	Tolib Ayyombekov; Colonel Boqir

Strength
Unknown	Unknown

Casualties and losses
41 killed 23 wounded	30 killed 40 detained
- Disputed number of civilians casualties

The Gorno-Badakhshan clashes consisted of fighting between Tajik government forces and an armed group led by Tolib Ayyombekov in Tajikistan's semi-autonomous Gorno-Badakhshan province in late July 2012. The Western media described the fighting as the worst in Tajikistan since 2010 or the 1992–1997 civil war.

== Background ==
On 21 July, Major-General Abdullo Nazarov, head of the Tajik national intelligence agency's branch in Gorno-Badakhshan, was fatally stabbed in Ishkashim after being dragged out of his car. The Tajik government accused the forces of Tolib Ayyombekov, a former opposition fighter, of responsibility. Ayyombekov had been an opposition combatant during the Tajik Civil War between the United Tajik Opposition and the government led by President Emomali Rahmon. He was given a government post in a subsequent peace deal. However, Ayyombekov, as well as other local leaders such as Muhammadboqir Muhammadboqirov, were gradually driven out as Rahmon again centralised power. Rahmon's government had also accused Ayyombekov of tobacco smuggling.

Ayyombekov denied any responsibility for Nazarov's death, stating that the general had been killed in a simple bar fight after he fell and struck his head on a rock.

== Clashes ==
After the government announced that "Ayyombekov and his accomplices have declined to face justice," phone and internet communications were cut off to the Gorno-Badakhshan capital of Khorog. Tajikistan's most popular news website was also shut down and the personnel of international aid groups were evacuated. Roadblocks were erected on roads leading into the area.

Tajik military forces then moved into the province after which "heavy fighting" ensued on 24 July with militants loyal to Ayyombekov and Muhammadboqirov in the streets of Khorog. Ayyombekov estimated in an interview that 800 Tajik soldiers had been deployed to the area. Residents reported seeing armored vehicles and helicopter gunships.

State-owned television reported that 23 soldiers had been wounded, but no soldiers or civilians had been killed. Initial casualty reports varied. BBC News reported at least 12 soldiers and 30 militants had been killed, but also spoke with a hospital source who reported more than 100 military personnel and 100 civilians dead. The Associated Press cited an unnamed government source as stating that at least twenty soldiers had been killed, while the chief military prosecutor, Khairullo Saidov, suffered a foot injury. Radio Free Europe/Radio Liberty reported that snipers had killed at least six civilians, including children. Al Jazeera reported 12 dead soldiers and 30 dead rebels, as well as more than 20 wounded soldiers.

President Rahmon ordered a halt to operations the following day, stating that rebel commanders had agreed to make "concessions," and called on all Gorno-Badakhshan militant groups to disarm. Reuters reported that Defence Minister Sherali Khayrulloyev had travelled to the area to offer amnesty to all militant leaders who surrendered.

In the aftermath of the fighting, on August 22, 2012, former Tajik opposition leader Imomnazar Imomnazarov was killed, by what many locals suspect to be the Tajik government.

== See also ==
- Andijan massacre
