= Qimmatgul Aliberdiyeva =

Tajikistani politician

Qimmatgul Khudoberdievna Aliberdiyeva (Tajik: Қимматгул Худойбердиевна Алибердиева) is a Tajikistani politician.

Aliberdeyeva served as Deputy Chairperson of the Committee for Family and Women's Affairs of Tajikistan under Khayrinisso Yusufi, and in 2015 was elected to the National Assembly, the upper house of the Parliament of Tajikistan, as a representative of the Gorno-Badakhshan Autonomous Region, of which she also served as deputy governor. In 2014, President of Tajikistan Emomali Rahmon named her acting mayor of Khorog; he relieved her of the post in 2016 when she reached retirement age.
