= Mahmadali Hayit =

Politician

Haitov Mahmadali Rahmonovich (b. 1957 in Rudaki District) is a Tajik politician who formerly served as the deputy chairman of the Islamic Renaissance Party of Tajikistan.

== Activism ==
Hayit was an outspoken member of the Islamic Renaissance Party of Tajikistan who advocated against President Emomali Rahmon's administration. He also worked as a journalist in Tajikistan, and was the Deputy Head of Tajikistan Radio and Television. Prior to that, Hayit was a member of the Rastokhez, a political party that functioned as the democratic opposition to the Communist Party of Tajikistan. The state put pressure on Hayit to stop his political activities. On April 19, 2013, Hayit was attacked outside of his home, just a week before a scheduled event to commemorate the Islamic Renaissance Party of Tajikistan's founding.

== Arrest and Sentence ==
Hayit was arrested on September 16, 2015, for allegedly participating in a failed coup led by former deputy minister of defense Abduhalim Nazarzoda. After a six-month trial, Hayit was convicted on a number of charges under the Tajikistan criminal code and sentenced to life imprisonment. Twelve other members of the Islamic Renaissance Party of Tajikistan were also arrested, and tried alongside Hayit on charges of extremism. Before he was brought to trial, Hayit was tortured and beaten, and since he has been in prison he has suffered both his arms and legs being broken. During his trial, multiple charges were brought against Hayit, relating to murder, terrorism, and "forcible" actions against the regime.

== International Response ==
In June 2016, the European Parliament adopted a resolution calling for the release of Hayit and other political prisoners in Tajikistan.

The human rights organization Freedom Now filed a petition on behalf of Hayit to the UN Working Group on Arbitrary Detention alongside the international law firm Hogan Lovells. The Working Group published an opinion in 2018, and requested the "Government of Tajikistan to take the steps necessary to remedy the situation of Hayit without delay and bring it into conformity with the relevant international norms, including those set out in the Universal Declaration of Human Rights and the International Covenant on Civil and Political Rights."
