= Muhammadboqir Muhammadboqirov =

Tajik Pamiri opposition fighter (1963–2022)

- Shughni: Māmadboqir Māmadboqiruv
- Born: October 10, 1963; Khorugh, Shughnon District, Badakhshan Mountainous Autonomous Region, Tajik SSR, Soviet Union
- Died: May 22, 2022 (aged 58); Khorugh, Shughnon District, Badakhshan Mountainous Autonomous Region, Tajikistan
- Military career
- Allegiance: United Tajik Opposition (1993–1997); Tajikistan (1997–2006)
- Service: Tajik Border Service
- Service years: 1997–2006
- Rank: Lieutenant Colonel
- Nickname: Colonel Boqir
- Unit: Murghob border detachment

Signature
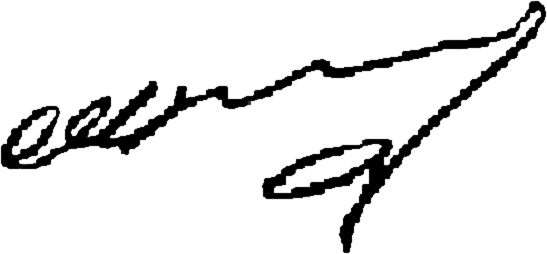

Muhammadboqir Muhammadboqirov (Note: Shughni: Māmadboqir Māmadboqiruv; Tajik: Муҳаммадбоқир Муҳаммадбоқиров, Perso-Arabic script: محمدباقر محمدباقراف, pronounced [muhæmmæd̪bɔˈqiɾ muhæmmad̪bɔˈqiɾuf]; Russian: Мухаммадбокир Карамалишоевич Мухаммадбокиров, romanized: Mukhammadbokir Karamalishoyev Mukhammadbokirov) (Note: Other variants of his name include the colloquial Tajik-language Mahmadboqir Mahmadboqirov (Маҳмадбоқир Маҳмадбоқиров, مَحمدباقر مَحمدباقراف) and Mamadboqir Mamadboqirov (Мамадбоқир Мамадбоқиров, ممدباقر ممدباقراف), as well as their Russian-language equivalents Makhmadbokir Makhmadbokirov (Махмадбокир Махмадбокиров) and Mamadbokir Mamadbokirov (Мамадбокир Мамадбокиров).) (10 October 1963 – 22 May 2022), commonly known as Colonel Boqir, was a Pamiri political figure, at one point associated with the United Tajik Opposition political alliance, from the Barkhorugh microraion of the city of Khorugh in the Badakhshan Mountainous Autonomous Region of Tajikistan. He has been variously described as someone who was either a warlord or popular oppositionist, by his enemies and supporters respectively.

== Opposition fighter and border guard ==
With the beginning of the Tajikistani Civil War in 1992, Muhammadboqirov became associated with the United Tajik Opposition, participating in combat against government forces in the Tavildara district.

As a result of the end of the Tajikistani Civil war in 1997, it was agreed that United Tajik Opposition forces would be integrated into the Tajik Border Service. Due to the withdrawal of Russian military forces from the borders of Tajikistan around this time, a sense of confusion was widespread among the Tajik border troops. In this atmosphere, Muhammadboqirov revealed his strong leadership ability and climbed the ranks, rising to the position of lieutenant colonel. He was given control over the Murghob border detachment, monitoring the border crossing of Tajikistan and China.

=== Dismissal ===
In 2006, after his military unit seized 730 kilograms of drugs being smuggled across the state border, he fell out of favour with the ruling authorities, and was dismissed from his position. This was seen by the opposition as part of the government's plan to gain full control over the illicit trade along the country's section of the Pamir Highway. Massive protests followed in the region, demanding the resignation of regional governor Alimuhammad Niyozmuhammadov. While the government had initially issued an order for Muhammadboqirov's arrest, the protests succeeded in preventing its implementation.

== Political opposition ==
During the 2012 Badakhshan Mountainous Autonomous Region clashes, government military forces entered Khorugh, intending to assassinate both Tolibbek Ayyombekov and Muhammadboqir Muhammadboqirov in order to take full political and economic control of the area. Although Ayyombekov surrendered and former opposition commander Imomnazar Imomnazarov was killed, Muhammadboqirov was able to survive the events, remaining one of the last few independent political leaders in the autonomous region.

In November 2012, during the aftermath of the clashes, Muhammadboqir Muhammadboqirov as well as other informal leaders, including Tolibbek Ayyombekov and Yodgorshoh Muhammadaslamov, were entered, at the request of the Tajik government, into ICPO-INTERPOL's database of wanted persons. They remained in it until January 2013, when the names were removed from the database.

On 15 December 2014, Muhammadboqir Muhammadboqirov was briefly arrested for 3 hours before being released on his own recognisance, reportedly for participating in an earlier attack on an office of the State Committee for National Security in late May and beating a security officer during it. This attack had taken place during a protest demanding an official investigation into deadly clashes between alleged drug traffickers and Tajik police in Khorugh earlier in the same month. As a result of Muhammadboqirov's detention, an unregistered Makarov pistol was confiscated from him.

In 2018, following brief tensions, all 7 informal leaders of Badakhshan (Note: As of 2018, the 7 informal leaders of Badakhshan were Amriddin Alovatshoyev, Khursand Mazorov, Muhammadboqir Muhammadboqirov, Munavvar Shanbiyev, Tolibbek Ayyombekov, Yodgorshoh Muhammadaslamov and Zoir Rajabov.) signed a protocol with the government, agreeing not to interfere in the activities of government agencies. In exchange for their agreement, all legal cases against them were dropped, and they were no longer officially referred to as criminals. Additionally, the government ceased demanding that they turn over all weapons in their possession. Following the signing of the protocol, the informal leaders were invited to meet Tajik president Emomali Rahmon in Dushanbe. Whilst 4 of them did attend, Muhammadboqirov was among those that did not accept the invitation.

On 22 February 2021, Muhammadboqirov was admitted to a hospital in Khrough, due to his condition suddenly worsening. His daughter Bargigul Muhammadboqirova, who is a medical student at Saint Petersburg State University, claimed to have identified signs of poisoning, though a source in the hospital told Radioi Ozodi that he was simply suffering from a case of sinal inflammation.

Following the arrest of Muhammadboqir Muhammadboqirov's brother Tohir Muhammadboqirov, as well as the killing of Pamiri civilian Gulbiddin Ziyobekov by the Tajik Militsiya in Tavdem in November 2021, major unrest once again returned to the region in the form of the 2021 and 2022 protests in the Badakhshan Mountainous Autonomous Region. Announcing his participation in the protests, Muhammadboqirov said:

“The lawlessness, injustice, corruption, abuse of office, violation of every human right, freedom of speech, and freedom of the press has provoked me, a lone citizen of Tajikistan, into protesting against state employees.”

=== Death ===
In an analysis of the situation made by some media outlets, the start of the Russian invasion of Ukraine in February 2022 caused international attention to shift away from Tajikistan, which the government saw as an opportunity to increase its control over Badakhshan. Against this backdrop, Rizo Nazarzoda, the mayor of Khorugh, demanded that Muhammadboqirov surrender himself to the authorities, accusing him of having attacked Badakhshan education official Lutfulloh Navruzov. This accusation was denied by Muhammadboqirov, who stated that he had never committed any violations of the law.

On 4 March 2022, Muhammadboqirov claimed that he came under fire while in his car, sustaining some damage to his right hand, while his son was also in the vehicle. Azam Tolezoda, deputy head of the Department of Internal Affairs of Badakhshan region, claimed that vehicle inspectors had only fired a warning shot to make Muhammadboqirov stop his car.

On 18 May 2022, the government officially launched an “anti-terror operation” in Khorugh, seeking to suppress the then-ongoing protests. A few days later, on 23 May, Muhammadboqirov was killed by sniper fire. One local was killed and another injured as they attempted to come to Muhammadboqirov's aid. Although the government officially denied any involvement in his death, Khorugh locals reported witnessing government forces committing the killing. A drone was spotted flying overhead as the killing took place, filming the entire event. A source in the interior ministry of Tajikistan reportedly told Pamir Daily News that the video was later shown to Emomali Rahmon by First Deputy Minister of Internal Affairs Abdurrahmon Alamshohzoda.

==== Aftermath ====
Following his death, thousands of Khorugh residents attended his funeral, despite preventative roadblocks having been placed along the streets by the government. The leader of the funeral processions, religious scholar Muzaffar Davlatmirov, was later arrested and sentenced to 5 years in prison. Tohir Abdolbekov, former chairman of the public utility office, was sentenced to 6.5 years in prison for attending it. Muhammadboqirov's brothers Akram Muhammadboqirov and Tohir Muhammadboqirov were also sentenced to 8 and 28 years in prison, respectively.

Of the 7 prominent informal leaders of Badakhshan who signed an agreement with the government in 2018, only one remains neither imprisoned nor killed. Shortly after Muhammadboqirov's death, Zoir Rajabov and Khursand Mazorov were also killed. Describing his role in the killings at a meeting with authorities of Khatlon region, Tajik president Emomali Rahmon stated:

“I gave the order to open fire!”

Munavvar Shanbiyev, Amriddin Alovatshoyev, and Tolibbek Ayyombekov, meanwhile, were arrested and sentenced to life imprisonment. Only Yodgorshoh Muhammadaslamov managed to avoid either fate, due to having retired from politics a few years prior and now living the life of an ordinary citizen in Porshinev.

==== International reactions ====
(Iran) Muhammadboqir Muhammadboqirov was described by Ahlul-Bayt News Agency, the official news agency of the Ahlul-Bayt World Assembly headed by Iranian leader Ali Khamenei, as a mujahid who was martyred.

The Iraqi Shia paramilitary group Kata'ib Hezbollah condemned the killing of Muhammadboqir Muhammadboqirov, describing him as a martyr. The group added that the Tajik government should cease its suppression of the protests in Badakhshan.

Al-Ahed News, owned by the Lebanese Communication Group of the Shia paramilitary group Hezbollah, blamed the government of Tajikistan for Muhammadboqir Muhammadboqirov's killing, describing him as a martyr.

Tohid Ibrahimbeyli, head of the Islamic Resistance Movement of Azerbaijan, a Shia paramilitary group from Azerbaijan, declared Muhammadboqir Muhammadboqirov a martyr.

== Personal life ==
As per Muhammadboqir Muhammadboqirov's Russian patrynomic, Karamalishoyevich, his father was named Karamalishoh Muhammadboqirov.

He had a son, as well as a daughter who is named Bargigul Muhammadboqirova, and brothers named Tohir Muhammadboqirov and Akram Muhammadboqirov.
