= Jonon =

Jonon may refer to:

- Jinong, a title of the Mongols
- Ionone, a ketone found in violets that contributes to their fragrance
- Jonon Bobokalonova (1929–2005), Tajikistani writer, literary critic, and academic
