= Badakhshan national football team =

Association football team in Tajikistan

- Nickname(s): Badakhshanis, Pamirians
- Association: Gorno-Badakhshan Autonomous Region Football Federation; Tajikistan Football Federation
- Confederation: N/A
- Home stadium: "Markaziy" (Khorugh)
First colours	Second colours

First international
- Badakhshan 3–3 FC Istiklol (Khorugh, GBAR, Tajikistan; 20 April 2016)

Biggest win
- none

Biggest defeat
- none

The Badakshshan national football team (also Gorno-Badakhshan Autonomous Region national football team) is a national side that represents Gorno-Badakhshan Autonomous Region of Tajikistan in association football. The team is controlled by the Gorno-Badakhshan Autonomous Region Football Federation and Tajikistan Football Federation, the governing body for all football in GBAO. Badakhshan is not a member of the FIFA or the AFC, and does not participate in any of their international tournaments.

He is a candidate for accession to the NF-Board and ConIFA — international football organizations, which bring together football teams and federations unrecognized and partially recognized states, as well as the various autonomous regions within the recognized states and autonomous countries not included for various reasons, FIFA and the continental confederations. Attempts to create a team of Badakhshan football for the first time taken in the early 1990s, when the territory of Tajikistan's Gorno-Badakhshan Autonomous Republic there was a semi-independent Badakhshan Autonomous Republic (ARB). These attempts have not been successful due to the civil war in the country and the lack of finance. After the Civil War and the abolition of the ARB, the idea of creating a team of Badakhshan was also carried out a number of reasons, primarily because of lack of finance. In 2016 team of Badakhshan was finally organised, which held its first match on April 20 of that year (on this day in Tajikistan has a national holiday — Day of National Unity) against the youth team of the club in Dushanbe Istiklol — one of the strongest clubs in Tajikistan. This match ended in a draw with the score 3:3. The match took place at the packed "Markaziy" stadium in Khorugh, which was attended by 15 thousand spectators. After this, they planned to hold matches against other clubs in Tajikistan and in the future to play friendly matches with the teams of the football organizations NF-Board and ConIFA, as well as join one of these organizations. While all this is not carried out and planned for the coming years.
