= Oroshori =

Oroshori may refer to:

- Oroshoris, an ethnic group native to the Pamir Mountains
- Oroshori language, a Pamiri language spoken by the ethnic group
