= Nobovar Chanorov =

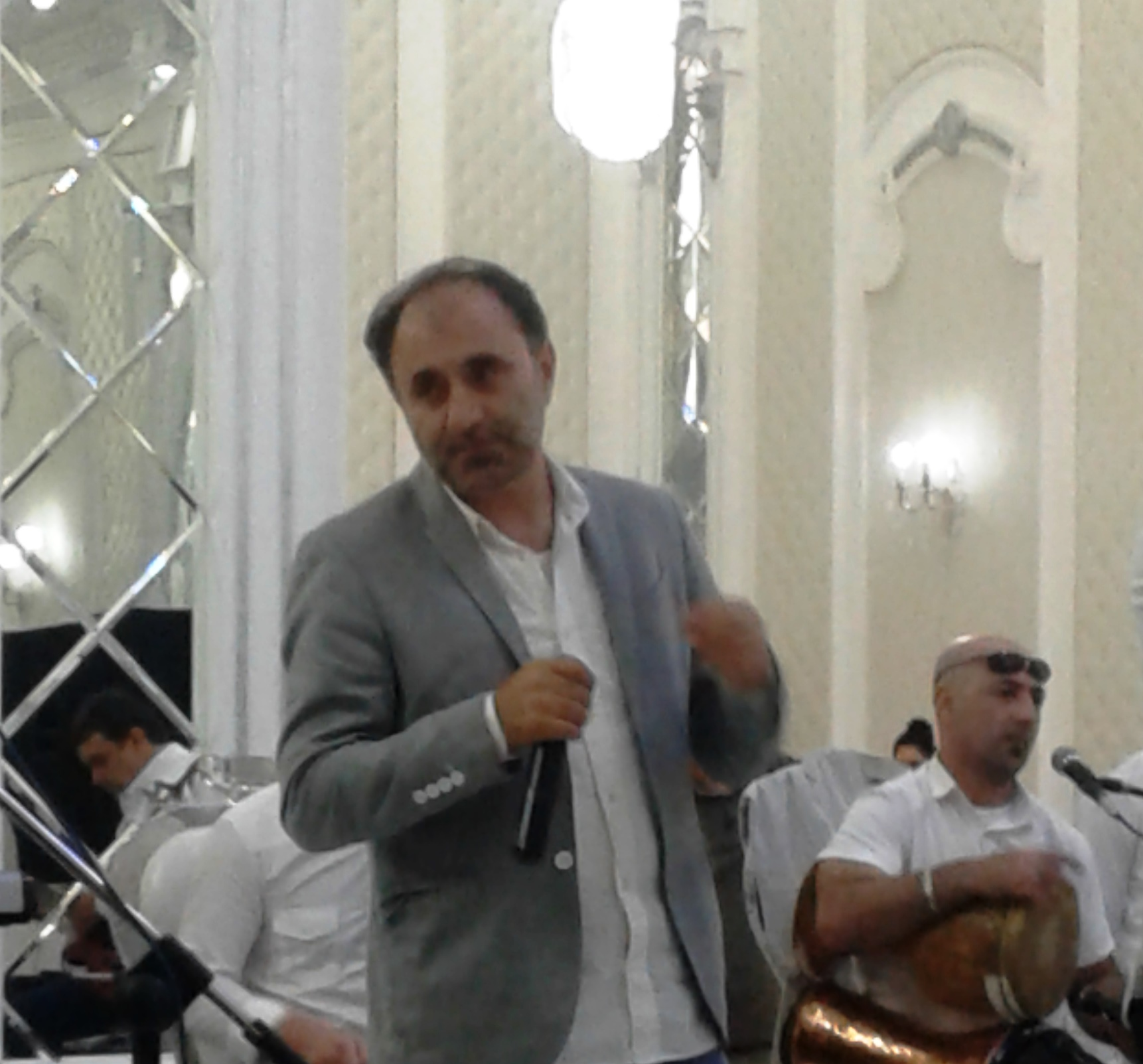

Background information
- Born: 25 December 1970 (age 55)
- Origin: Komsomolobod, Rasht Valley, Tajikistan
- Genres: Pop, rock
- Instrument: Vocals
- Member of: Shams

Nobovar Chanorov (Tajik: Нобовар Чаноров, Russian: Нобовар Чаноров; born 25 December 1970) is a Tajik singer of the Shams group. The Shams and Nobovar Chanorov are known as Beatles of Northern Badakhshan.

Created in 1995, Shams is today one of the best groups of Rock and Roll in Tajikistan. This group of 7 musicians between 25 and 40 years, originating in Badakhshan, Tajikistan, is the most known group since their first concert in Almaty. A month before the peace agreement of civil war was signed in Tajikistan, the group has returned to Dushanbe. The musicians of the group change regularly and Shams of today is known especially thanks to its singer Nobovar Chanorov and his guitarist Iqbol Zavqibekov. Up to now the group has produced 4 albums.

Shams is also known in Afghanistan, in Uzbekistan, in Russia and in Europe.

In 2002 he performed at the Smithsonian Folklife Festival, as part of an ensemble performing Badakhshani music alongside Ulfatmo Mamadambarova and others.

== Life and education ==
Nobovar was born in Komsomolobod in the Rasht valley of Tajikistan. His parents are originally from Dehrushan village of Rushan District of Gorno-Badakhshan Autonomous Oblast, in the Pamirs. Himself being a Rushani speaker (one of the many Pamiri languages), he sings mostly in Tajiki and Rushani. However, he sings individual songs in Spanish, English and Russian.

Nobovar has spent his childhood and schooling years in the home village of his parents - Dehrushan. He started his singing from early years. As part of his family tradition, he started playing rubab (the traditional local musical instrument) and accordion and singing maddoh (traditional motives for prays of god) and pop-songs. His father, seeing his talent, gave him to the local musical school which he attended after his formal school at certain days of the week.

As most of his youth days were spent playing different musical instruments and singing different types of traditional and pop-songs, this took him to the doors of the Institute of Arts in Dushanbe, Tajikistan. However, he graduated as an actor of drama rather than singer or musician. Nevertheless, he has maintained his commitment to and love of singing.

The band "Shams" of which Nobovar is the lead singer has celebrated their 10th anniversary in Kokhi Borbad in Dushanbe in early 2010. "Shams" is known through Nobovar though there are talented musicians in the band some of whom went for professional development trips abroad.

Today, Nobovar is one of the musicians of Tajikistan and of the Pamirs in his own right and style.
