= Vahdat, Gorno-Badakhshan =

Vahdat Russian: Вахдат Tajik: Ваҳдат
- Location in Tajikistan
- Coordinates: 37°35′N 71°31′E
- Country: Tajikistan
- Region: Gorno-Badakhshan Autonomous Region
- District: Shughnon
  - Summer (DST): +5
- Official languages: Russian (Interethnic); Tajik (State)

Vahdat (Tajik: Ваҳдат, formerly Миденшор, Midenshor; Russian: Вахдат, romanized: Vakhdat; Persian: میدنشار), is a village in Gorno-Badakhshan Autonomous Region in south-east Tajikistan. It is the seat of Shughnon District.
