= Tuhfa Fozilova =

Soviet opera singer and actor (1917–1985)

Tuhfa Fozilova Туҳфа Фозилова
- Born: 25 April 1917; Konibodom, Russian Turkestan, Russian Empire (present-day Tajikistan)
- Died: 3 February 1985 (aged 67) Dushanbe, Tajik SSR, Soviet Union
- Genres: Classical
- Occupation(s): Opera singer, actress
- Instrument: Singing

Tuhfa Fozilova (Note: Tajik: Туҳфа Фозилова, romanized: Tuḣfa Fozilova; Russian: Туфа Фазыловна Фазылова, romanized: Tufa Fazylovna Fazylova) (April 25, 1917 – February 3, 1984) was a Tajikistani actress and singer of the Soviet era. During her operatic career, she performed as a lyric soprano.

== Biography ==
Fozilova was born into a working-class family in Konibodom, and began her career in that town, in the havaskoron amateur groups. The first role which she played was the title role in Lolakhon by Komil Yashin. In 1933 she joined the Tashkent Music Theater, but returned the next year to the Leninabad Drama and Music Theater. The next year she went to Dushanbe, then called Stalinabad, and began working to promote Tajik opera and ballet. Roles during this time included the title role in Halima by Ghulam Zafari and Gulchira in Arshin Mal Alan by Uzeyir Hajibeyov. She joined the Communist Party of the Soviet Union and won the People's Artist of the Tajik SSR in 1941. Other roles followed; these included Qumri in Lola, by Sergey Balasanian and Samuil Urbakh; Gulizor and Nushofarin in The Vose' Uprising and Kaveh the Blacksmith, both by Balasanian; and the title role in Razia by Ziyodullo Shahidi, among other roles. She moved to the Lahuti State Academy of Dramatic Arts in 1949, where her roles included Guli in Alisher Navo'i by Uighun and Izzat Sulton and three roles in plays by Sadriddin Ayni and Jalol Ikromiy, Mahtob in Unfulfilled Girl, Gulnor in Dokhunda, and Poshokhon in Burning Hearts. She also appeared in a number of films produced by Tajikfilm. Member of the Union of Cinematographers of the Tajik SSR (1963). Named a People's Artist of the USSR in 1957, she received the Rudaki State Prize in 1979; other decorations which she received during her career include the Order of Lenin and the Order of the Red Banner of Labour. Fozilova died in Dushanbe. The theater in Konibodom is named in her honor. In 2017, the biennial theatrical festival in Dushanbe was dedicated in part to the centenary of her birth.
