= Hashim Gadoev =

- Ҳошим Гадоев
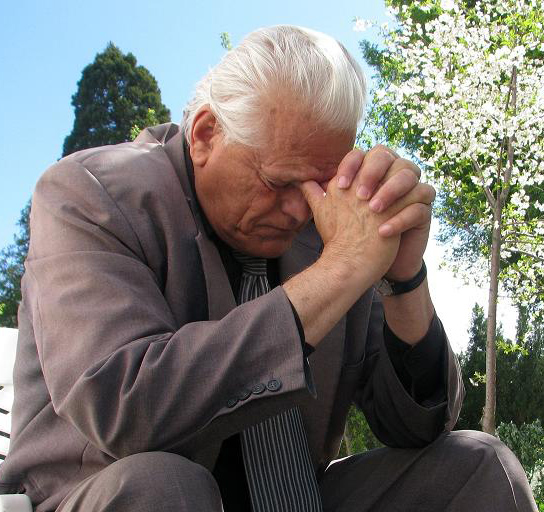
- Born: May 10, 1937 (age 88); Kulob, Tajik SSR, Soviet Union
- Other names: Hashim Gado
- Education: Russian Institute of Theatre Arts
- Occupations: Actor, theatre director
- Years active: 1961–present

Hashim Gadoev (Note: Tajik: Ҳошим Гадоев, romanized: Ḣoshim Gadoev; Russian: Хошим Гадоев, romanized: Khoshim Gadoyev) or Hashim Gado (Note: Tajik: Ҳошим Гадо, romanized: Ḣoshim Gado; Russian: Хошим Гадо, romanized: Khoshim Gado) (born May 10, 1937) is a Soviet, Tajik theater and film actor, theater director, teacher, and writer. Gadoev was awarded People's Artist of the USSR in 1988.

== Biography ==
Hashim Gadoev was born on May 10, 1937, in Kulab (now in the Khatlon Region, Tajikistan).

He graduated from the Russian Institute of Theatre Arts in 1960.

Since 1961 he is an actor and director of the Tajik Drama Theater named after I. A. Lakhuti located in Dushanbe. Member of the Union of Cinematographers of the Tajik SSR (1972).

== Awards ==
- People's Artist of the Tajik SSR (1979)
- People's Artist of the USSR (1988)
- USSR State Prize (1987) — for the title role in the play "Oedipus" by Sophocles on the stage of the Tajik State Academic Theater named after A. A. Lakhuti.
- State Prize of the Tajik SSR named after Rudaki (1973) — for the role of Suhrab in the film "Rustam and Suhrab".
- Anahita Name Award (1995)
- Order "Star of the President of Tajikistan"

== Filmography ==
- 1963 – Twelve hours of life — Kamil
- 1964 – Ulugbek's star — prince Abdal-Latif Mirza
- 1967 – Fugitive
- 1965 – Born in a thunderstorm — episode
- 1969 – Exposure — Базайшо
- 1971 – Here is the border — Turkan
- 1971 – Rustam and Suhrab — Suhrab
- 1972 – Hurricane in the valley — Yarmatov
- 1972 – Four from Chorsang — Maqsud
- 1973 – Wrestlers
- 1974 – Border
- 1975 – The last hunt (short film)
- 1975 – The light of extinguished bonfires — Gaza-khan
- 1977 – Siege — Niyaz
- 1977 – Nasruddin's first love — Talgatbek
- 1978 – A woman from afar — Sasha Rasulov
- 1980 – Serving the Fatherland — Bobo Peshtuni
- 1982 – Paradise won't meet you here — Black Vortex
- 1982 – Awakening — Kudrat
- 1983 – Knights of the Black Lake — Quli
- 1984 – State border. Red sand — Muminbek
- 1987 – Jura – hunter from Min-Arhar — Ibrahimbek
- 1990 – Battle of the Three Kings — Agat Mara
- 1995 – The call of the ancestors. Sogdiana — Ikhshid Gurak, ruler of Sogdiana.
