= Mu'tabar Ibrahimova =

Tajikistani actress

Mu'tabar Ibrahimova (Tajik: Муътабар Иброҳимова, Russian: Мутабар Ибраги́мова; 2 January 1930 – 18 May 2008) was a Tajikistani actress of the Soviet era.

Ibrahimova was born in Konibodom, and in 1945 entered the Leninabad (later Khujand) Institute of Music while working at the Leninabad Youth Theater. She was on the roster of the Pushkin Comedy Musical Theater of the Republic in 1947. Her first role was Asalkhon in Gulsara by Kamil Yashin and M. Muhammadov, in 1949, after which she played many of the main roles in works presented by the theater. Other roles which she essayed include Modar in Mother Was Worried by Faizullo Ansori; the title role in Nurkhon by Komil Yashin; Farmobini in The Rebellion of the Brides by Said Ahmad; Shamsiniso in By Order of the Cheka by Azam Sidqi; Sad Barq in The Poet's Heart by Rahim Jalil; and Shirin in Farhad and Shirin, also by Komil Yashin. Ibrohimova was also active as a screen actress, with roles in such films as When the Mill Stopped, 1973; The Unimportant Beecame Important, 1976; and Strange Luck. Named a People's Artist of the Tajik SSR in 1974, she received numerous other awards during her career, including three medals, the Order of the Badge of Honour, and the Order of the Presidium of the Supreme Soviet of Tajikistan. She remained associated with the theater in Khujand for the duration of her career, and was otherwise active in local cultural life as well.
