= Taji Sultanova =

- Born: February 9, 1918; Khujand, Tajikistan
- Died: 2010 (aged 91–92)
- Occupation: Actress

Toji Sultonova (Tajik: Тоҷӣ Султонова) sometimes called Toji Sulton (Tajik: Тоҷӣ Султон; February 9, 1918 – 2010) was a Tajikistani actress of the Soviet era.

Sultonova was born in Khujand. Beginning in 1929, she studied at the Factory School of the Kombinat, continuing until 1933; during her time there she performed with the Kombinat amateur theatrical troupe as well. In 1934 she was invited to join the company of the Pushkin Music and Drama Theater in her native city, then called Leninabad. She remained with the theater until retiring from the stage in 1976. During her career she played roles in many works by Russian, Soviet Tajik and foreign writers. Among the characterizations for which she was most notable were Katerina in The Storm by Alexander Ostrovsky; Shirin in Farhad and Shirin by Kamil Yashin; Layli in Layli and Majnun by S. Khurshed; the title role in Gulsara by Kamil Yashin and Muzaffar Muhamaddov; and Mahinbonu in Farhad and Shirin by Nâzım Hikmet. Besides her abilities as an actress, Sultonova was noted during her career as a singer and dancer. Fur her work she was awarded the Honorary Order of the Presidium of the Supreme Soviet of Tajikistan and the Order of the Badge of Honour, along with a variety of medals. She was named a People's Artist of the Tajik SSR in 1941.
