= Mayram Isoeva =

Tajikistani actress

- Born: 1 May 1937 (age 89)
- Occupation: Actress

Mayram Ne'matovna Isoeva (Tajik: Марям Неъматовна Исоева; born 1 May 1937) was a Tajikistani actress of the Soviet era.

Born in the village of Sari Khosor in the Kulob District, Isoeva graduated from middle school in Dushanbe in 1954. Two years later she enrolled in the Lunacharsky Institute of Dramatic Arts, from which she graduated in 1960. She next spent a year at the Pushkin Musical and Comedy Theater in Khujand, then called Leninabad, before joining the roster of the Lahuti Academy of Dramatic Arts. In 1971 she became a member of the Communist Party of the Soviet Union. Isoeva played main roles in tragedies and dramas during her career. She first won notice for her portrayal of Arina in Poverty is No Vice by Aleksandr Ostrovsky, a role which she took on during her studies. Later roles included Smeroldina in King Stag by Carlo Gozzi and Emilia in Othello by William Shakespeare. She also appeared in plays by Tajikistani writers, including playing Mavjuda in Woman's Resolve by Azam Sidqi and roles in two plays by Ghani Abdullo, Bakhmal in The Song of the Highlands and Tahmina in Rustam and Suhrab. During her career, Isoeva also appeared in a number of films produced by TajikFilm. For her work she was granted the title of People's Artist of the Tajik SSR in 1979, and she was also named a Distinguished Contributor to Tajik Education. She won the Nohid Prize, and received a number of medals from the government, including the Order of the Red Banner of Courage, the Jubilee Medal "In Commemoration of the 100th Anniversary of the Birth of Vladimir Ilyich Lenin", and the Honorary Order of the Presidium of the Supreme Soviet of Tajikistan. Her eightieth birthday was celebrated with a showing of some of her films in 2017.
