= Aziza Azimova =

- Born: December 5, 1915
- Died: 1997 (aged 81–82)
- Occupations: dancer; actress

Aziza Azimova (Tajik: Азиза Азимова, Russian: Ази́за Ази́мова) (December 5, 1915 – 1997) was a Soviet and Tajikistani ballet dancer and actress.

== Life ==
Born in the village of Surkhi, Uroteppa, Sughd Region, Azimova entered the Bukhara Women's Pedagogical Institute in 1927 and began working with the havaskoron amateur troupe. In 1930 she joined the roster of the traveling Theater of Tashkent Workers. In 1932 she returned to the Tajik SSR, where she began work at the Lahuti State Academy of Dramatic Arts. At this stage in her career she was an actress, appearing in such roles as Shirin in Struggle by Abulhaq Usmonov; the title role in Ra'no by Saidmurodov; and Adelma in Turandot by Carlo Gozzi. She became a member of the Communist Party of the Soviet Union in 1941. Between 1938 and 1946, Azimova performed at the State Theater in Dushanbe. Her roles there included Nozgul in Two Flowers by Aleksandr Lensky; Lise in La fille mal gardée by Peter Ludwig Hertel; and Maria in The Fountain of Bakhchisarai by Boris Asafyev. From 1946 to 1951 she attended the Lunacharsky State Institute for Theatre Arts in Moscow, receiving a degree in directorship and advanced ballet. During this time she performed in Doktor Aybolit by Igor Morozov and The Red Poppy by Reinhold Glière; the latter served as her dissertation performance. Azimova then returned to Tajikistan, serving as the chief dancer of the State Philharmonic Society, and taught younger performers as well. In 1964 and 1965 she worked in Kabul. In 1967 she became a member of the faculty at the Dushanbe Pedagogical Institute. Later in life she served as a ballet mistress. Besides ballet, she also expressed an interest in Tajik folk dance. For her work Azimova received numerous awards during her career; chief among these was the title of People's Artist of the Tajik SSR, which she received in 1941. She twice was granted the Order of the Red Banner of Labour and twice the Order of the Badge of Honour, and she was awarded numerous other medals as well. She died in 1997.

Azimova was among the first Tajikistani ballet dancers to make a career in the Russian theater. She remains a highly regarded figure in the Tajikistani cultural sphere.
