= Nigina Raufova =

Tajikistani singer and composer

Nigina Raufova (Tajik: Нигина Рауфова) (21 May 1945 – 22 December 2010) was a Tajikistani singer and composer, active beginning in the Soviet era.

== Biography ==
Born in the village of Shirmon in the Faizobod District, Raufova began her performing career working with the amateur groups of the Kombinat of Weavers in Dushanbe. Her singing career started in 1971, when she became a member of the Ensemble of Rebab Players. She began to sing for Tajikistan Radio and Television in 1975. Her repertoire encompassed popular songs from many of the Soviet republics, most especially those of the Tajik SSR, the Uzbek SSR, the Azerbaijani SSR, the Turkmen SSR, and the Russian SSR, as well as music from Afghanistan, Iran, and other areas of the Middle East. She accompanied the Ensemble when it traveled to the Belarusian SSR and the Moldovan SSR; in 1978, with the Lola Dance Ensemble, she traveled to France to give a concert. Among the songs which she is notable for having sung during her career are "Askarbacha" ("Boy Soldier"); "Bui Gul" ("The Fragrance of a Flower"); "'Ishqi Khubon" ("The Love of the Beloved"); "Sarzamini Mo" ("Our Land"); and "Kosh Mididam Turo" ("I Wish I Could See You"). Beginning in 1989 she was a member of the musical ensemble Dare of Tajikistan Radio and Television, a position which she continued to hold at the time of her death. Raufova was named a People's Artist of the Tajik SSR in 1977. Other awards which she received during her career include the Jubilee Medal "In Commemoration of the 100th Anniversary of the Birth of Vladimir Ilyich Lenin", the Honorary Order of the Presidium of the Supreme Soviet of Tajikistan, and the Order of the Red Banner of Courage. In 1996 she received the Rudaki Prize. Raufova died of a heart attack in Dushanbe.
