= Muslima Baqieva =

- Born: 7 November 1933; Bukhara, Tajikistan
- Died: 2016 (aged 82–83); Dushanbe, Tajikistan
- Resting place: Sariosiya Cemetery, Dushanbe, Tajikistan
- Occupation: Singer

Muslima Baqieva (Tajik: Муслима Боқиева; 7 November 1933 – 2016) was a Tajikistani singer of traditional music, active during the Soviet era.

== Biography ==
Born in Bukhara to an ethnic Tajik family, Baqieva began her career performing with the havaskaran amateur groups of that city. In 1953 she became a member of the Ensemble of Rubab Players of the Tajik State Philharmonic Society. Her repertoire encompassed songs in numerous languages, including Tajik, Azeri, Russian, and Turkmen; among those for which she was especially famous were such pieces as "O Flame of the East", "Flower in the Garden", "Cup of Wine", and "Souvenir". When the ensemble traveled to Iran, in 1957, and Afghanistan, in 1963 and 1973, she performed as a member of the group. She traveled to Moscow to participate in the Tajik Decade of Art and Literature, and in 1957 performed in the same city, in the sixth Youth Festival. For her work she was named a People's Artist of the Tajik SSR. At her death Baqieva was interred in the Sariosiya Cemetery in Dushanbe.
