= Nuqra Rahmatova =

Tajikistani singer

Nuqra Rahmatova (Tajik: Нуқра Раҳматова) (born January 2, 1942) was a Tajikistani folk singer and dancer of the Soviet era.

== Early life ==
Rahmatova was born in the village of Bartang in the Rushon District of the Gorno-Badakhshan Autonomous Region, and received her early education in the public schools. She began her performing career as an amateur singer and dancer; in 1958 she became a soloist with the Tarona Ensemble and began to dance for the Tajikistan State Philharmonic Society. She studied voice at the Dushanbe Institute of Music from 1963 until 1967, in which year she became a soloist with the Maqomkhoni Ensemble; her teacher at the Institute was Ahmad Bobokulov.

== Career ==
During her career she sang folk songs from many of the Republics of the Soviet Union, including the Tajik SSR, the Uzbek SSR, the Azeri SSR, and the Russian SSR; she also performed music from Afghanistan and Iran as well as other countries in the Middle East. Her career took her in performance to Afghanistan, Mongolia, Syria, and Iraq; in 1957 she went to Moscow to appear in the Youth Festival, and in 1976 she performed in the ceremonies marking the 10th Anniversary of Tajik Literature in Kyrgyzstan. In 1960, she appeared in the film Kaveh the Blacksmith, marking her only appearance in the medium. She also appeared in televised concerts, and performed for numerous visiting dignitaries. She also performed in a trio with Ulfatmo Mamadambarova and Maisara Dildorova.

== Recognition ==
Rahmatova was named a People's Artist of the Tajik SSR for her work, and received awards from the Central Committee of the Union of Workers and the Central Committee of Radio and Television. She was also nominated to be a People's Artist of the USSR, but this never came to fruition.

== Personal life ==
During the Tajikistani Civil War Rahmatova sheltered friends and family members in her apartment in Dushanbe; she retired from the stage after the war.
