= Sofia Tuibayeva =

- София Эрҷоновна Тӯйбоева
- Born: Sofia Erjonovna Tuibayeva; January 30, 1913; Kazalinsk, Kazakhstan
- Died: October 26, 1996 (aged 83)
- Occupation: Actress

Sofia Erjonovna Tuibayeva (sometimes transliterated Tuyboeva) (Tajik: София Эрҷоновна Тӯйбоева, Russian: София Эрджановна Туйбаева) (January 30, 1913 – October 26, 1996) was a Tajikistani actress of the Soviet era.

Born in Kazalinsk, Tuibayeva began her career in Bukhara in the mid-1920s. Between 1929 and 1931 she was an actress at the Hamza Dramatic Theater in Tashkent; in 1931 she joined the Lahuti State Academy of Dramatic Arts. Her career gained momentum in the 1930s; among her roles at this point were Juliet in Romeo and Juliet and Nadezhda Krupskaya in The Storm by Ghani Abdullo and Shamsi Qiyomov. During the 1940s she worked with directors such as Nikolai Akimov. Tuibayeva began to work in cinema in 1934; her films include Man bo Dukhtari Vokhurdam (I Met a Girl, 1957), in which she played Mehrinisokhola; Qismati Shoir (The Lot of the Poet, 1959), in which she played Boy; Vaqti Zangirii Pisaram Rasid (It Is Time for My Son to Get Married, 1960), in which she appeared as Saidabonu; and Zumrad (Zumrad, 1961), in which she played Modari Jalil. Named a People's Artist of the Tajik SSR in 1941, Tuibayeva is recognized as one of the founders of the Tajik National Theater, and was instrumental in the training of many younger Tajikistani artists. For her work she received the Order of Lenin and the Order of the Red Banner of Labour, the latter three times over. She died in Dushanbe.
