= Bozgul Isoeva =

Tajikistani ballet dancer (1937–2008)

Bozgul Mamedova Isoeva
- Born: November 3, 1937; Dushanbe, Tajik SSR, Soviet Union
- Died: 2008 (aged 70–71)
- Career
- Dances: Ballet dance

Bozgul Mamedova Isoeva (Tajik: Бозгул Исоева; 3 November 1937 – 2008) was a Tajikistani ballet dancer of the Soviet era.

Isoeva was born in Dushanbe, and grew up in an orphanage in Shahri Nov. She studied at the Leninabad Institute of Choreography from 1949 until 1958, in the latter year becoming a soloist at the Ayni State Theater for Opera and Ballet; she was among the school's first graduates, and while there studied with M. V. Boyarchikov and N. A. Zheleznov. Among the roles which she had in her repertoire there were the title role in Giselle by Adolphe Adam; Odette in Swan Lake by Pyotr Illych Tchaikovsky; Mercedes in Don Quixote by Ludwig Minkus; and The Great Waltz by Johann Strauss II. She appeared in works by other composers as well, including pieces by Tajikistani composers. She also danced a number of solos in concert, performing works such as The Dying Swan of Camille Saint-Saëns and other numbers set to the music of Christoph Willibald Gluck and other composers. While with the company she participated in a number of international tours. She also appeared in films during her career. For her work Isoeva was named a People's Artist of the Tajik SSR in 1971.
