= Tamara Abdushukurova =

Tajik actress (1940–2025)

Minister of Culture of Tajikistan
- In office 1990–1992
- Preceded by: Nur Tabar
- Succeeded by: Ato Hamdam

Personal details
- Born: 24 August 1940 Shulmak, Rahimzoda, Rasht District, Tajikistan SSR
- Died: 7 July 2025 (aged 84) Dushanbe, Tajikistan
- Education: Russian Institute of Theatre Arts
- Occupation: Actress, Theatre director, academic

Tamara Abdushukurova (Tajik: Тамара Абдушукурова; 24 August 1940 – 7 July 2025) was a Tajik actress and theatre director.

== Life and career ==
Abdushukurova was born 24 August 1940 in Shulmak, Gharm District, Tajik SSR, USSR. In 1956, after winning a youth amateur competition, she enrolled at the Tajik Studio of the Lunacharsky Moscow Institute of Theatrical Arts (GITIS).

Throughout her career, she performed in numerous stage plays, and created works such as The Chosen Marriage, Beloved Friends, and The Unequipped.

In 1970, she was awarded the People's Artist of the Tajik SSR award.

Tamara Abdushukurova died in Dushanbe on 7 July 2025, at the age of 84.
