= Oydina Usmonova =

Tajikistani stage actress (1928–2014)

- Born: Oydina Yahioevna Usmonova; 10 January 1928
- Died: 2014 (aged 85–86)
- Occupation: Actress

Oydina Yahioevna Usmonova (Tajik: Ойдина Усмонова; 10 January 1928 – 2014) was a Tajik stage actress of the Soviet era.

Born in Samarkand, Usmonova began acting in her youth. In 1944 she was accepted by the Pushkin Music and Drama Theatre in Khujand, at the time called Leninabad. That year she went to Dushanbe to work at the Sadriddin Ayni State Theatre for Opera and Ballet, where she continued to be listed as a member of the company until 1949. In that year she returned to Leninabad to the Pushkin Music and Drama Theatre to continue her career. Her work there was varied; among the roles she performed were Desdemona in Othello and Larisa in Without a Dowry by Aleksandr Ostrovsky. She also appeared in work by Tajikistani playwrights, playing Modar in Shahla by Aminjon Shukuhi and Askar Hakimov. She was named a People's Artist of the Tajik SSR in 1964. Usmonova received a number of awards and decorations from the Soviet government during her career, including the Order of the Red Banner of Courage and the Jubilee Medal "In Commemoration of the 100th Anniversary of the Birth of Vladimir Ilyich Lenin". Usmonova died in 2014.
