= Ulfatmo Mamadambarova =

Musical artist from Gorno-Badakhshan

Ulfatmo Mamadambarova Улфатмо Мамадамбарова
- Born: March 10, 1937; Khorog
- Died: May 4, 2024 (aged 87) Khorog
- Instrument: Voice
- Spouse: Gulbek Saodatov

Ulfatmo Mamadambarova, in Tajik: Улфатмо Мамадамбарова (10 March 1937, Khorog - 4 May 2024, Khorog) was a Pamirian singer from Gorno-Badakhshan, an autonomous region of Tajikistan, whose contributions to music meant that she was recognised as an Honored Artist of Tajikistan.

In 2019, she recorded new material for a compilation of Tajik folksongs. Recordings of her work are part of the Smithsonian's Centre for Folklife and Cultural Heritage. In 2002, she sang and played doira and chang at the Smithsonian Folklife Festival, as part of an ensemble performing Badakhshani music alongside Nobovar Tchanorov, Mouborakcho Djoumaev, Zarina Kobilova, Djoumakhon Madjidov, Moussavar Minakov and her husband. Her career included work as the soloist in the ensemble Pamir. She also performed in a trio with Nuqra Rahmatova and Maisara Dildorova. Music by the Tajik poet Kurbonmamad Shodmonbekov was also in her repertoire.

Mamadambarova trained at Khorog's Musical and Drama Theater named after A. Rudaki, along with Dildorova and Kimatsho Imatshoev. She was also trained in shashmaqam by Shokhnazar Sokibov. She was married to singer Gulbek Saodatov.
