= Bashoratkhon Tojiboeva =

Bashoratkhon Tojiboeva (Tajik: Башоратхон Тоҷибоева) (10 November 1916 – 20 August 1965) was a Tajikistani actress of the Soviet era.

Tojiboeva was born in Namangan. Little is known about her early life and career; she is first recorded as having worked with the Konibodom Comedy and Drama Theater from 1932 to 1934. Beginning in the latter year and continuing to 1935, she worked for the Nav Drama and Music Theater, and between 1936 and 1938 she worked for the Chikalov Drama Theater. In 1938 she joined the Pushkin Comedy and Music Theater of Khujand, then known as Leninabad, where she would remain on the roster for the rest of her life. Roles which Tojiboeva essayed during her career included Varvara in The Storm by Aleksandr Ostrovsky; Khonzoda in The Rich Man and the Servant by Hamza Hakimzade Niyazi; Saltanat in Celebration by Sanad Ghani; and the title roles in three plays by Komil Yashin, Gulsara, Oftobkhon, and Nurkhon. For her work she was named a People's Artist of the Tajik SSR in 1943. During her career she also received the Order of the Badge of Honour and the Honorary Order of the Presidium of the Supreme Soviet of Tajikistan, as well as a number of medals. She died in Leninabad.
