= Porshinev =

- Jamoat
- Location in Tajikistan
- Coordinates: 37°35′N 71°31′E
- Country: Tajikistan
- Region: Gorno-Badakhshan Autonomous Region
- District: Shughnon District

Population (2015)
  - Total: 8,723
- Time zone: UTC+5 (TJT)
- Official languages: Russian (Interethnic); Tajik (State) (Note: Constitution of Tajikistan)

Porshinev (Russian and Tajik: Поршинев), also called Porshnev, is a jamoat in eastern Tajikistan. It is located in Shughnon District in Gorno-Badakhshan Autonomous Region. The jamoat has a total population of 8,723 (2015). Its main village is Vahdat.

In the pre-Soviet period Porshinev was written in Persian as Porshinev (پارشنیو) or Porshinef (پارشنیف).
