= Tajikistan Football Federation =

Governing body of association football in Tajikistan

AFC
- Short name: FFT
- Founded: 1936; 90 years ago
- Headquarters: Dushanbe
- FIFA affiliation: 1994
- AFC affiliation: 1993 (Associate member), 1994
- CAFA affiliation: 2015
- President: Rustam Emomali
- Website: http://www.fft.tj

The Tajikistan Football Federation (Note: Tajik: Федеросиюни футболи Тоҷикистон, romanized: Federosiyuni futboli Tojikiston) (TFF) is the governing body of football in Tajikistan. The federation was founded in 1936 in the Tajikistan SSR as a sub-federation of the Football Federation of the Soviet Union. It was not until 1994 when the Federation was accepted by the international community including the continental and global associations.

== Association staff ==
Name	Position	Source
(Tajikistan) Rustam Emomali	President	
(Tajikistan) Khurshed Mirzo	Vice President	
(Tajikistan) Dilshod Juraev	2nd Vice President	
(Tajikistan) Alisher Urunov	3rd Vice President	
(Tajikistan) Davlatmand Islomov	General Secretary	
(Tajikistan) Sherali Kholov	Treasurer	
(Tajikistan) Salokhidin Gafurov	Technical Director	
(Croatia) Petar Šegrt	Team Coach (Men's)	
(Tajikistan) Ildar Rakhmanov	Team Coach (Women's)	
(Serbia) Dejan Đedović	Futsal Team Coach (Men's)	
(Tajikistan) Faridum Saliev	Media/Communications Manager	
(Tajikistan) Damir Kameletdinov	Futsal Coordinator	
(Tajikistan) Abdurakhim Babayev	Referee Coordinator	

== See also ==
- Badakhshan national football team
