= Abduhalim Nazarzoda =

Major General Abduhalim Nazarzoda
- Абдухалим Назарзода
- Born: 1 January 1964; Rudaki District, Tajik SSR, Soviet Union
- Died: September 16, 2015 (aged 51); Vahdat, Tajikistan
- Military career
- Allegiance: USSR; Tajikistan
- Branch: Soviet Armed Forces; Tajik Armed Forces
- Service years: 1983–1985; 1997–2015
- Rank: Major General
- Nickname: Hodzhi Holim (Ходжи Холим)

Abduhalim Mirzo Nazarzoda (1 January 1964 – 17 September 2015) was a military leader in the Tajik National Army and the former Deputy Minister of Defense of the Republic of Tajikistan.

== Early life ==
He was born in the Guliston village of the Rudaki District of the Tajik SSR on 1 January 1964, to a family of workers. In 1981 he graduated from secondary school No.63 in Dushanbe. After finishing school he worked in a Dushanbe textile factory until 1983. From 1983 to 1985, Nazarzoda served in the Soviet Armed Forces. According to Asia-Plus, between 1993 and 1997, Nazarzoda was one of the field commanders of the armed formations of the United Tajik Opposition. According to the Ministry of Defense, on 7 September 1997, after signing a peace agreement, Nazarzoda was appointed commander of military unit 31001 of the Tajik National Army.

== Later career ==
From 2005 to 2007, he served as the first deputy commander of the ground forces. Nazarzoda in 2007 graduated from the Combined Arms Academy of the Armed Forces of the Russian Federation. In 2009 he graduated from the Tajik National University. Between 2007 and 2014, he served in many of Tajikistan's security services. Nazarzoda was appointed deputy defense minister in January 2014, which will be his final appointment. He was dismissed from his post on 4 September 2015, after Tajikistani Authorities accused him of "Committing a Crime" after there was violence between Nazarzoda's followers and government forces. He became a fugitive in Tajikistan after he was dismissed.

== Death ==
Nazarzoda and 135 of his supporters attacked the Police Department of a small town of Vakhdat on 16 September 2015, killing five policemen and four riot police officers. He was killed in a shootout between his followers and troops of the Interior Ministry the next day.

== See also ==
- Armed Forces of the Republic of Tajikistan
- Ministry of Defence (Tajikistan)
- Tajikistan insurgency
