= Sergey Balasanian =

Soviet Armenian composer (1902–1982)

Sergey Artemyevich Balasanian (Russian: Серге́й Арте́мьевич Баласаня́н; 26 August 1902 – 3 June 1982) was a Soviet Armenian composer.

== Life and career ==
Sergey Artemyevich Balasanian was born on 26 August 1902 in Ashgabat, Russian Empire. He studied at the Moscow Conservatory (MC) where he graduated with a degree in music history in 1935. One of his teachers at the MC was Dmitry Kabalevsky with whom he studied music composition.

He joined the academic staff of the Moscow Conservatory in 1948; ultimately rising to the position of chair of the music composition program from 1962-1971. Balasanian wrote the first Tajik opera – The Uprising at Vosse (first staged in 1939). It was debuted in Moscow in 1941 as part of a 10-day exhibition of Tajik art.

Sergey Balasanian was awarded the Stalin Prize (1949) and five orders. In 1964 he was named an Honored Art Worker of the Russian SFSR, and in 1970 he was decorated as People's Artist of the Tajik SSR.

Balasanian died in Moscow on 3 June 1982.

== Works ==
- Sakuntala (ballet)
- The Uprising at Vosse (opera,1939)
- Blacksmith Kova (opera, 1941)
- Song of Anger (musical drama, 1942)
- Armenian Rhapsody (orchestral suite, 1944)
- Leyli and Majnun (ballet, 1947)
- Bakhtior and Nisso (opera, 1954)
- Afghan Pictures (symphonic cycle, 1959)
- Four Folk Songs of Africa (song cycle, 1961)
- Cello Sonata (1976)
- Across Armenia (1978)
