= Jonon Bobokalonova =

Tajik writer and literary critic (1929–2005)

Jonon Karimovna Bobokalonova (sometimes Bobokalanova) (Tajik: Ҷонон Каримовна Бобокалонова) (13 September 1929 – 17 June 2005) was a Tajikistani writer, literary critic, and academic of the Soviet era. Her name is sometimes given as Jonon Karim.

== Biography ==
Bobokalonova was born into a working-class family in the village of Pulodon in Konibodom. She graduated from the Dushanbe Pedagogical Institute in 1949. That same year she took a post at the Sadriddin Ayni High School in the same city, teaching the Tajik language and literature; at the same time she became head of one of the departments of the children's magazine Piyanir. She continued her studies at the pedagogical institute, performing postgraduate research there from 1950 until 1951. In 1954, she returned once more to the Institute to teach Tajik literature, with an emphasis on works for children, at the Department of Tajik Literature. In 1958, she became a member of the Communist Party of the Soviet Union. In the same year, she defended her thesis, on the children's works of Mirsaid Mirshakar at the Faculty of Eastern Studies at the Leningrad Academy of Arts, marking the first time such a scholarly work had been written on Tajik children's literature.

Later, she became chair of Tajik literature at the Pedagogical Institute. She received a doctorate in philology in 1983, being named a professor two years later. Bobokalonova was among the first literary critics to concern herself with Tajikistani literature for children; during her career, she also developed an interest in the work of other children's writers from various Soviet republics. Later in her career, she also began to write on the subject of women's history. She became a member of the Union of Writers in Tajikistan in 1991, and a member of the Union of Journalists of Tajikistan in 1995. She received a number of medals and awards during her career, including being named a Prominent Scientific Figure of the Republic of Tajikistan in 1994.

== Selected works ==
Taken from

- Some Considerations Regarding Literature for Tajik Children (1954)
- Miroz Mirshakar's Post-War Stories for Children (1956)
- Anthology of Soviet Children's Literature (Dushanbe, 1971)
- Materials Pertaining to Literature for Tajik Children (Dushanbe, 1975)
- Mirashkar: A Children's Poet (1976)
- Tajik Children's Literature (Dushanbe, 1982)
- The Great Life Expositionist (Dushanbe, 1985)
- The Hero and Time (Dushanbe, 1991)
- From the Peak of the Glorious Mountain (Dushanbe, 1992)
- The Sun on Top of the Mountain (Dushanbe, 1998)
- The Role of Women in the King's Letters (Dushanbe, 1998)
- The Wings of Art (Dushanbe, 1999)
- Zan va Zamon (Dushanbe, 2000)
- The Role of Women in Farsi-Tajik Literature (five volumes)
- Great Man of Art
- A Look at the History of Literary Criticism of Farsi-Tajik Literature
- Good Deeds Will Remain Forever (selected writings)
- various poems and stories for children

She also participated as an editor in the publication of the five-volume Collection of Children's Literature, published in Dushanbe between 1979 and 1984, and assisted in the compilation of a textbook on children's literature.
