= Oroshori dialect =

Shughni dialect of Tajikistan and Afghanistan

Oroshori
- Roshorvi
- Орошори Orošori; Орошори зив Orošori ziv
- Native to: Tajikistan, Afghanistan
- Region: Gorno-Badakhshan, Badakhshan Province
- Ethnicity: Oroshoris
- Native speakers: (1,500 cited 2001)
- Language family: Indo-European: Indo-Iranian; Iranian; Southeastern Iranian; Shughni-Yazghulami-Munji; Shughni-Yazghulami; Shughni-Sarikoli; Shughni; Bartangi-Oroshori; Oroshori
- Writing system: Cyrillic script (Tajik Cyrillic alphabet)

Language codes
- ISO 639-3: –
- Glottolog: oros1238 Oroshor
- ELP: Oroshor

Oroshori (also known as Roshorvi) is a dialect of Shughni, a Pamiri language spoken in the Gorno-Badakhshan Autonomous Region in Tajikistan as well as 267 speakers in Afghanistan's Badakhshan Province. It is similar to other dialects of Shughni such as Rushani and Bartangi. Oroshori contains many loanwords from Sarikoli as well as Kyrgyz.
