= People's Artist of the Tajik SSR =

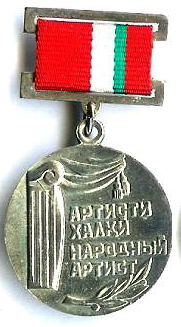
- Awarded for: Outstanding achievements in the performing arts
- Country: Tajik SSR, Soviet Union
- Presented by: Chairman of the Supreme Soviet of the Tajik SSR
- First award: March 18, 1941; 85 years ago

People's Artist of the Tajik SSR (Russian: Народный артист Таджикской ССР, Tajik: Артисти халқии РСС Тоҷикистон), is an honorary title awarded to citizens of the Tajik SSR in the Soviet Union. It is awarded for outstanding performance in the performing arts, whose merits are exceptional in the sphere of the development of the performing arts (theatre, music, dance, circus, cinema, etc.).

== Partial list of recipients ==
- Tamara Abdushukurova
- Nikolay Akimov
- Aziza Azimova
- Savsan Bandishoeva
- Muslima Baqieva
- Sergey Balasanian
- Zahir Dusmatov
- Tuhfa Fozilova
- Hashim Gadoev
- Rena Galibova
- Mu'tabar Ibrohimova
- Bozgul Isoeva
- Mayram Isoeva
- Barno Itzhakova
- Shoista Mullojonova
- Nuqra Rahmatova
- Nigina Raufova
- Sabzajon Shoismoilova
- Toji Sultonova
- Bashoratkhon Tojiboeva
- Sofia Tuibayeva
- Oydina Usmonova

== See also ==
- People's Artist of the USSR
