= Mirsaid Mirshakar =

Soviet-Tajik artist and chairman (1912–1993)

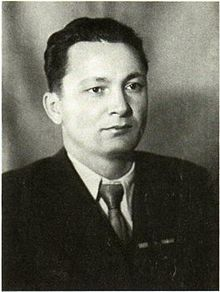
- Born: 5 May 1912; Fergana Oblast, Russian Empire
- Died: 1 August 1993 (aged 81); Dushanbe, Tajikistan
- Occupations: Poet, writer, dramatist, editor

Mirsaid Mirshakar or Mirsaid Mirshakarov (Russian: Мирсаид Миршакар или Миршакаров; 5 May 1912 – 1 August 1993) was a Soviet and Tajikistani poet, writer, dramatist and editor. A representative of the Supreme Council of the SSR of Tajikistan, a member of the Central Committee of the Republic of Tajikistan, the chairman of the Republican Committee of Sympathy with Asian and African Countries, a member of the Presidium of the Soviet Committee of Sympathy with Asian and African Countries, a member of the board of the Union of Writers of Tajikistan.

== Life and career ==
Mirsaid Mirshakar was the son of a farmer, born in the village of Sindev, Pamir, Russian Empire, now Gorno-Badakhshan Autonomous Province, Tajikistan. He graduated from the Central Soviet Party School in Dushanbe in 1930, and his works began to appear in print the same year. He became a member of the Communist Party of the Soviet Union in 1944 and was the People's Poet of the Tajik Soviet Socialist Republic in 1962.

From 1932 to 33, Mirshakar served as the editor of the newspaper Sokhtmoni Vakhsh. He wrote narrative poems glorifying historic events in the life of the Tajik people after the October Revolution. Mirshakar was considered one of the founders of Tajik children's literature. His writings for children were the subject of the doctoral thesis of literary critic Jonon Bobokalonova.

Mirshakar served as the executive secretary of the Writers’ Union in Tadzhik from 1940 to 1943 and from 1946 to 1959. He also served in a number of administrative positions, including Chairman of the Supreme Soviet of the Tajik SSR. For his service as a poet, Mirshakar was awarded several state prizes for his works.

== Honors and awards ==
- Two Orders of Lenin
- Two Orders of the Red Banner of Labour
- Two Orders of the Badge of Honour
- Order of Friendship of Peoples
- Order of the October Revolution
- Jubilee Medal "In Commemoration of the 100th Anniversary of the Birth of Vladimir Ilyich Lenin"
- Medal "For Valiant Labour in the Great Patriotic War 1941–1945"
- Stalin Prize

== Works ==
Selected works include:

- The Golden Kishlak, 1942
- She’rho va poëmaho, Dushanbe, 1945
- The Turbulent Piandzh, 1949
- She’rho va dostonho, Dushanbe, 1954
- Lenin in the Pamirs, 1955
- Kulliyot, parts 1–3, Dushanbe, 1970–73
- Stikhotvoreniia i poemy, Moscow, 1951
- Love and Duty, 1962
- Lenin’s Gaze, 1962
- Liubov’ i dolg. Poemy, Moscow, 1964
- Polovod’ia zhizni, Moscow, 1972

Plays

- Tashbek and Gul’kubran, 1946
- The Golden Kishlak, 1949
- My City, 1951
