= Gorno-Badakhshan =

Autonomous region of Tajikistan

Coordinates: 38°0′N 73°0′E

- Autonomous region
- Badakhshan Mountainous Autonomous Region

Name transcription(s)
  - Tajik: Вилояти Мухтори Кӯҳистони Бадахшон
  - Russian: Горно-Бадахшанская автономная область
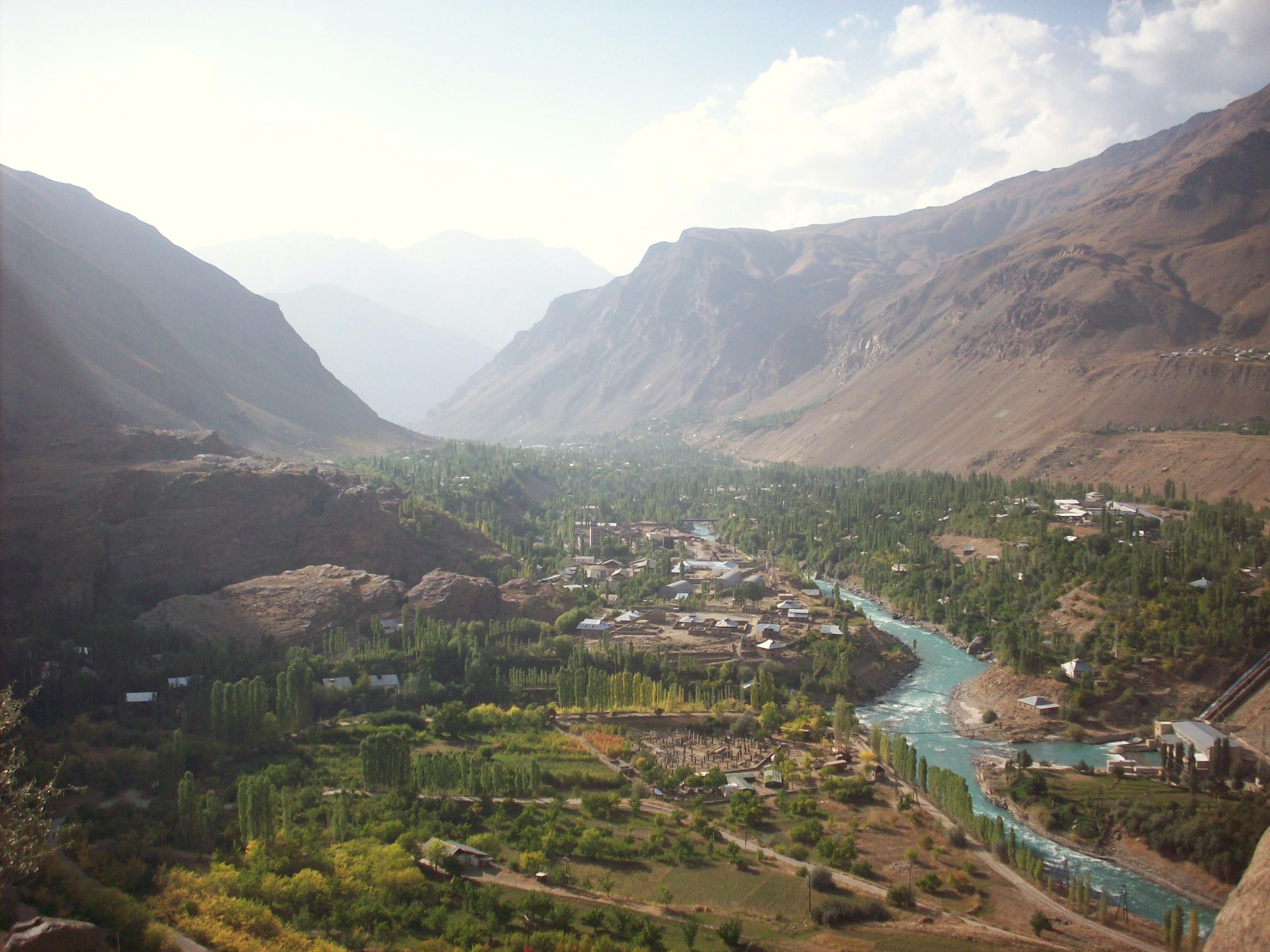
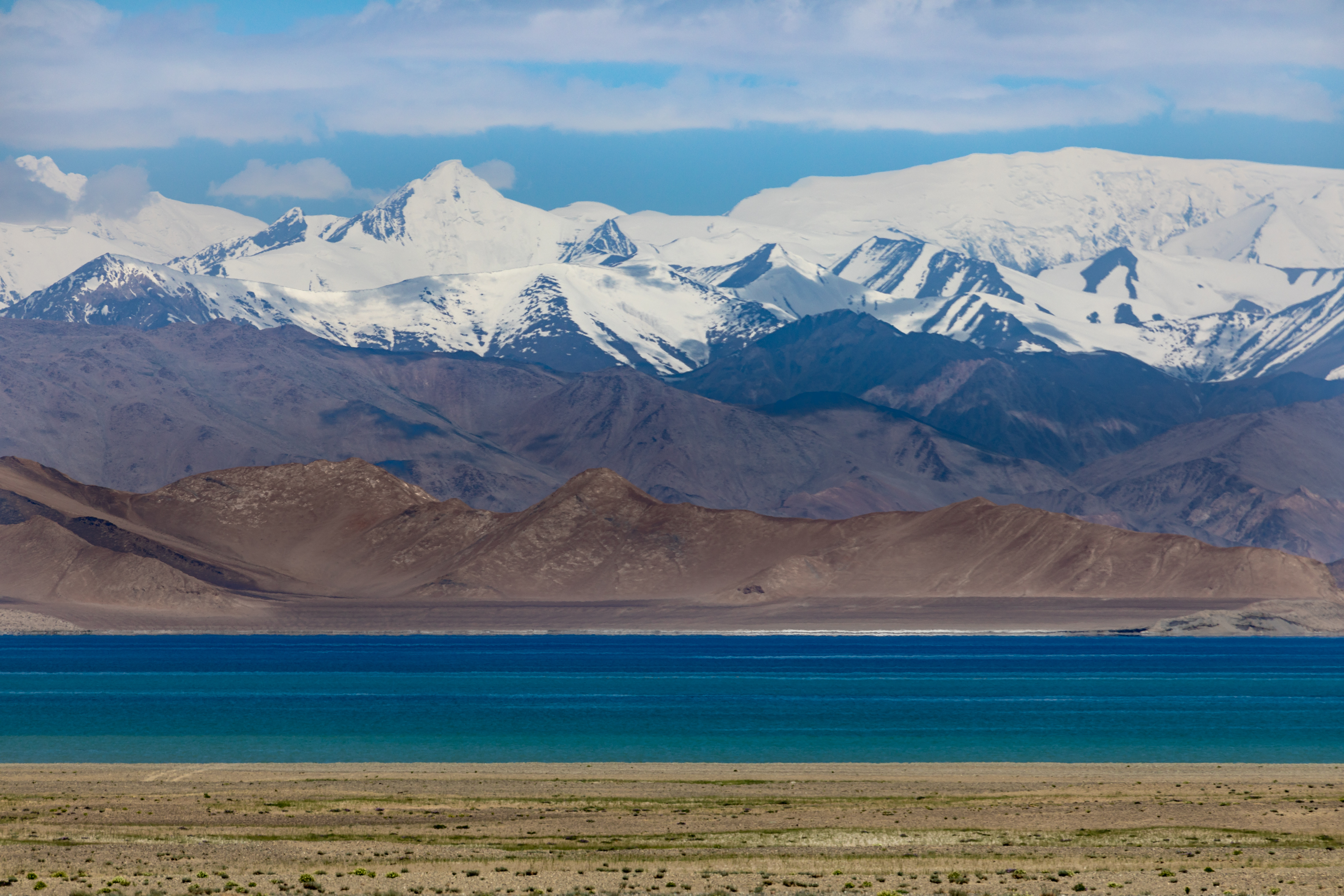
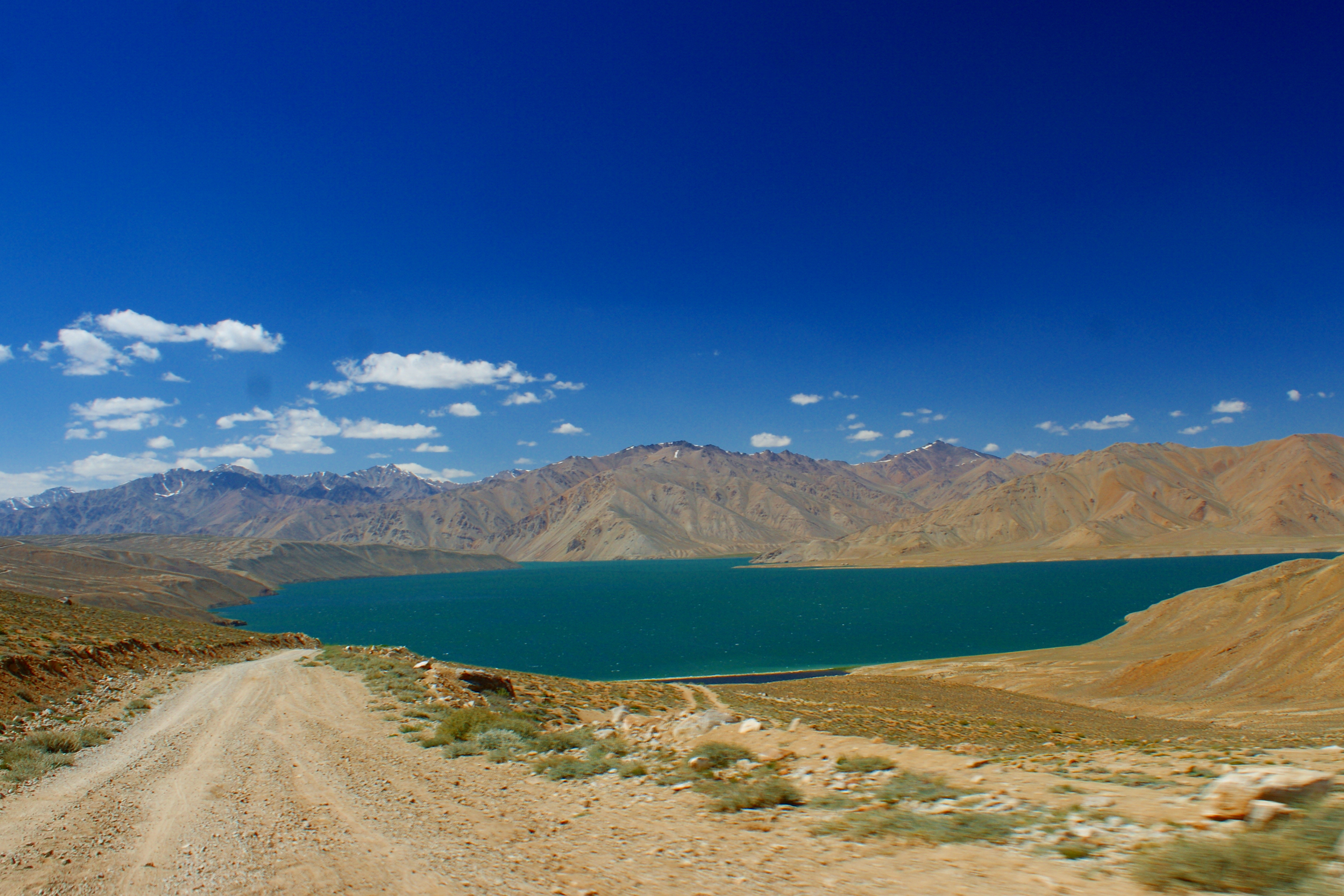
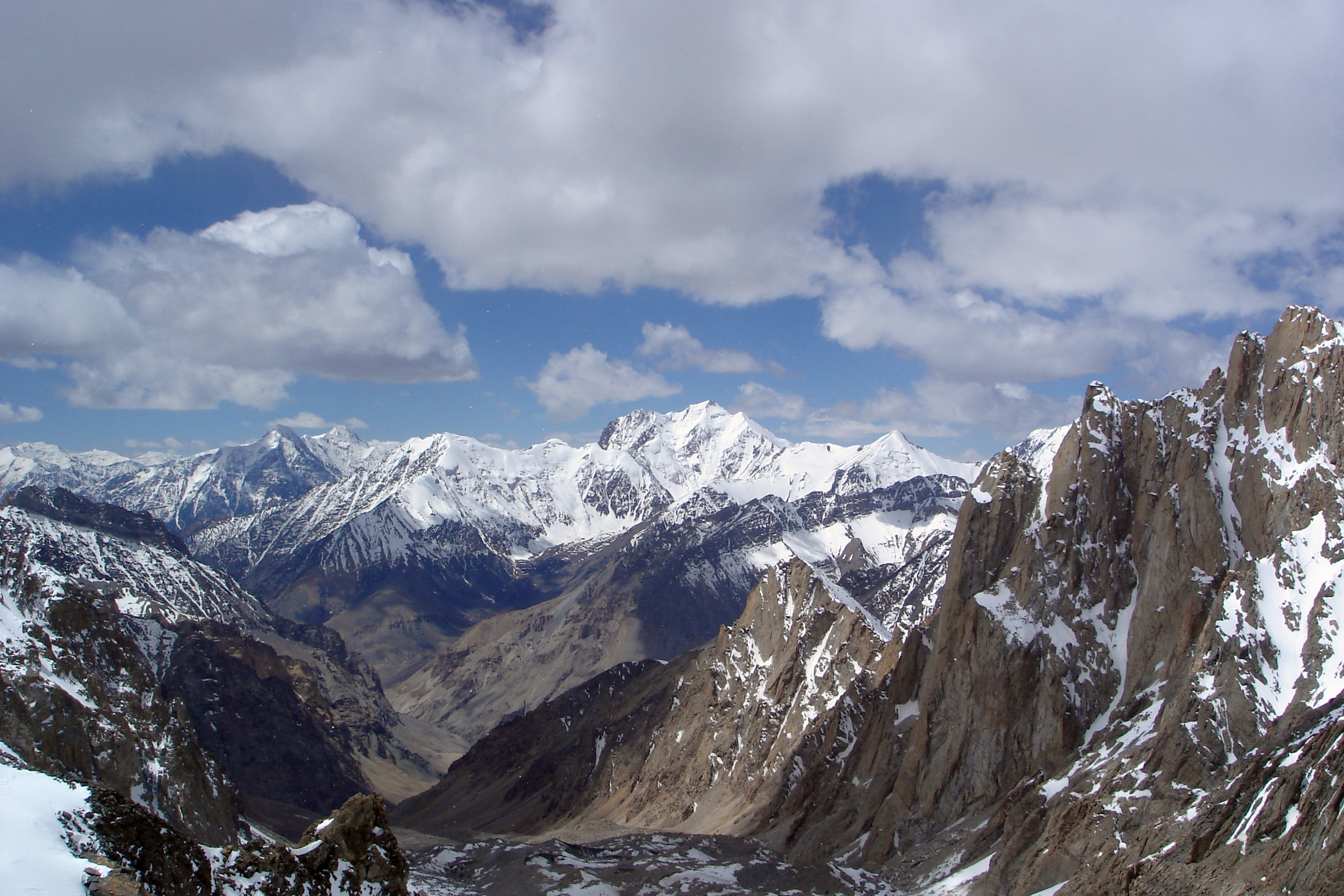
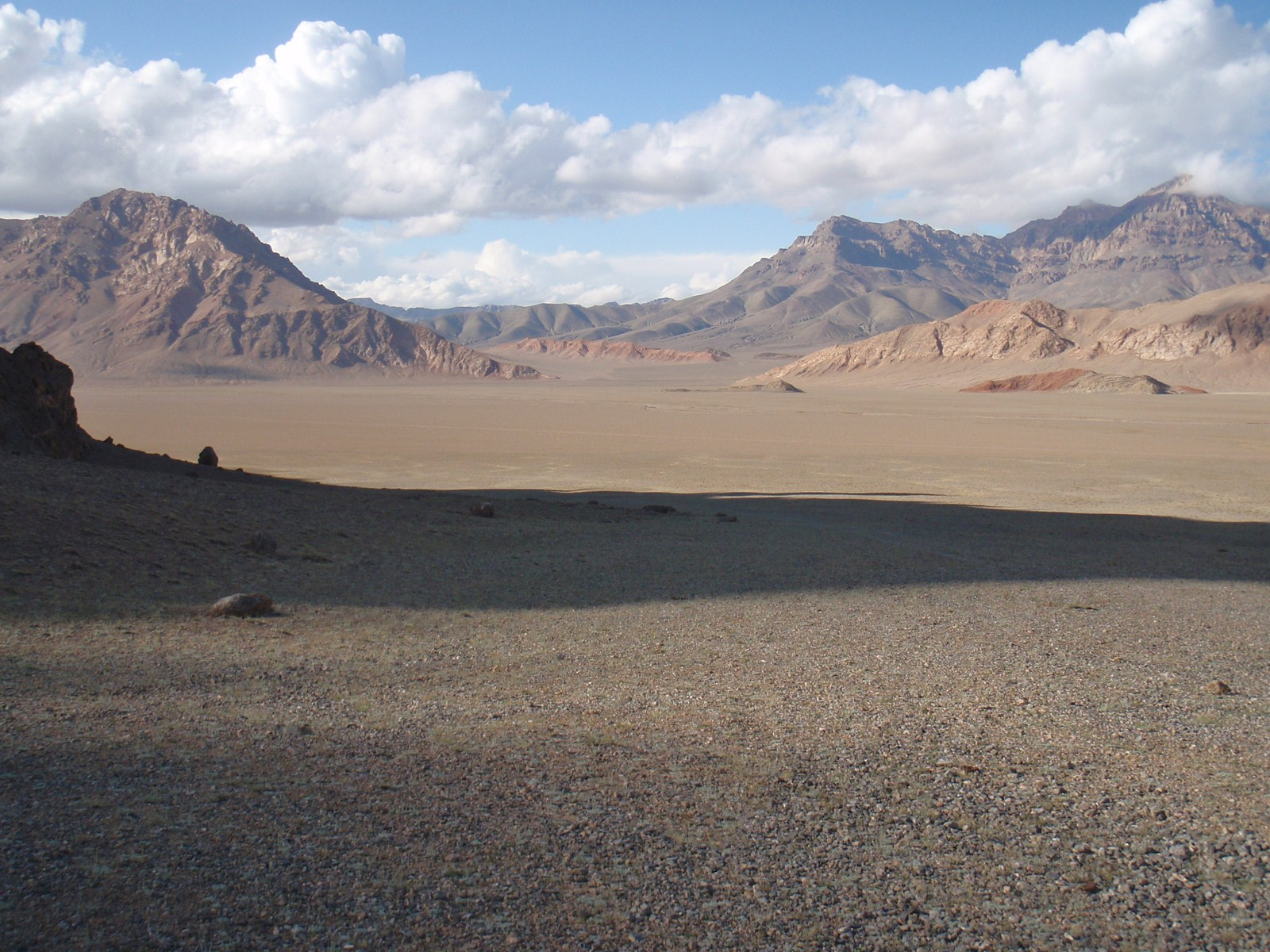
- Khorog Karakul Lake Bulunkul Lake Pamir Mountains Kurteskei Valley

- Gorno-Badakhshan in Tajikistan
- Country: Tajikistan
- Capital: Khorog

Government
  - Chairman: Vacant

Area
  - Total: 64,200 km^{2} (24,800 sq mi)

Population (2019)
  - Total: 226,900
  - Density: 3.53/km^{2} (9.15/sq mi)
- ISO 3166 code: TJ-GB
- HDI (2023): 0.700 high
- Official languages: Russian (Interethnic); Tajik (State)
- Indigenous minority languages: Bartangi; Ishkashimi; Khufi; Kyrgyz; Rushani; Sanglechi; Shughni; Wakhi; Yazgulyam

Gorno-Badakhshan, (Note: /ˈɡɔːrnoʊ bəˈdɑːkʃɑːn/; lit. 'Mountainous Badakhshan' in Russian) officially the Badakhshan Mountainous Autonomous Region, (Note: Tajik: Вилояти Мухтори Кӯҳистони Бадахшон (ВМКБ), romanized: Viloyati Mukhtori Ko‘histoni Badakhshon (VMKB), IPA: [ʋɪlɔˈjatʰɪ mʊχˈtʰɔɾɪ kʰɵhɪsˈtʰɔnɪ bɐdɐχˈʃɔn (ˌʋeˌmeˌkʰeˈbe)]; Russian: Горно-Бадахшанская автономная область (ГБАО), romanized: Gorno-Badahšanskaja avtonomnaja oblastj (GBAO), IPA: [ˈgornə bədɐxˈʂanskəjə ɐftɐˈnomnəjə ˈobɫəsʲtʲ (ˌgɛˌbɛˌaˈo)]) is an autonomous region in eastern Tajikistan, in the Pamir Mountains. It makes up nearly forty-five percent of the country's land area but only two percent of its population.

== Name ==
The official English name of the autonomous region is the Badakhshan Mountainous Autonomous Region. The name Badakhshan (from Russian: Бадахшан; Tajik: Бадахшон) is derived from the Sasanian title bēdaxš or badaxš. "Gorno-Badakhshan" literally means "mountainous Badakhshan" and is the Russian name of the autonomous region, Gorno-Badakhshanskaya avtonomnaya oblastʹ (literally Gorno-Badakshan autonomous oblast). The Russian abbreviation "GBAO" is also commonly used in English-language publications by national and international bodies such as the government of Tajikistan and the United Nations.

== History ==
Borders and political authority in the Western Pamir had always been contested by imperial powers. Between the 17th and 19th century, several semi-self governing statelets, including Darwaz, Shughnun-Rushan and Wakhan, ruled over the territories that are today a part of Gorno-Badakhshan Autonomous Region in Tajikistan and Badakhshan Province in Afghanistan. In the late 19th century, the emirates of Kokand and then Bukhara held political authority over the region until the Western Pamir was colonized by Russia, completed in 1896. Although Russia and the British empire in 1896 denominated their shared border through the Pamir, which resulted in the creation of the Wakhan corridor, other regional powers like China and Afghanistan, but also the ruling elites of Badakhshan, Bukhara, Kashgaria and Kashmir equally worked for expending their influence in the Pamir. So, the Sarykol range has been demarked de facto as Eastern border in 1894 between the Qing empire and the Russian empire. This imperial history still has relevance nowadays as it determined contemporary southeastern borders of the present-day autonomous region.

=== Soviet Union ===
The Tajikistani Badakhshan as distinctive polity with its contemporary Western borders and the Russian designation GBAO was created as autonomous republic in 1925. Later in 1929, this was changed to autonomous oblast, of the Tajik Soviet Socialist Republic (Tajik SSR). The Soviet Orientalists' obsession with categorization of peoples led to the fixation of among others the identity category of Pamiris, or 'Mountain Tajiks' in the Soviet ethnogenesis. During the Soviet Union years, a lot of resources had been allocated to Gorno Badakhshan as borderland of the Soviet Union, for instance through privileged access to higher education and the construction of infrastructure like the Pamir highway in 1935, which is still remembered nowadays as a time of modernity. Therefore, people from the Pamirs used to have facilitated upwards mobility and access to political offices in the Tajik SSR. In scholarly discourse, this is regarded as a measure to safeguard loyalty to state socialism of the subjects at the strategically important Soviet 'frontier'.

=== Since Independence ===
When the Tajikistani Civil War broke out in 1992, the local government in Gorno-Badakhshan declared independence from Tajikistan. Many politically active Pamiris later joined the democratic political movement La’al-e Badakhshan during the Tajik Civil war, which demanded autonomy and democratic rule for the region. Regionalism was an important structuring factor in the Tajik Civil war, so that the Ismaili identity became a key marker of mobilization. La'al-e Badakhsan joined the United Tajik Opposition in 1997. Because of that, they were subsequently targeted by the popular front, which constituted the later government and then excluded from the political sphere of independent Tajikistan. The Gorno-Badakhshan government later backed down from its calls for independence.

After the disintegration of the Soviet Union, the Ismaili development organization AKDN delivered supplies to Gorno-Badakhshan from Kyrgyzstan, which prevented the starvation of the population during the civil war. While the AKDN itself frames this engagement as temporary measure, many of the inhabitants demand a permanent presence of humanitarian aid. Many see it as continuation from the provisioning of goods during the Soviet times. This shared experience of Soviet and Ismaili development aid together with the neglect and crackdown by the Tajik state led to people perceiving themselves as Pamiri rather than Tajik.

In 2011, Tajikistan ratified a 1999 treaty to cede 1,000 km^{2} (390 sq mi) of land in the Pamir Mountains to the People's Republic of China (PRC), from the Chinese state perspective ending a 130-year-old border dispute and China's claims to over 28,000 km^{2} (11,000 sq mi) of Tajik territory. At other instances Chinese scholars claimed control over the entire Pamir Mountains. However, the government of the Republic of China (ROC) based in Taipei does not recognize this treaty and continues to claim the territory, as reflected in its official maps. Whereas the government of Tajikistan celebrates the ceding of land as diplomatic victory, many Tajikistani scholars, opposition and parts of the population contest the existence of a 'dispute' altogether, seeing Badakhshan's territory in its entirety belonging to Tajikistan. Instead, the ceding of land belonging to Kuhistani Badakhshan in 2011 to China by some, especially in Gorno-Badakhshan was perceived as territorial loss and sparked anxieties about further encroachments of the Chinese state.

=== 21st century civil unrest ===
A number of violent clashes and demonstrations have occurred in the region since the end of the civil war, with major incidences of civil unrest in 2012, 2014, 2018, 2021, and 2022. Clashes erupted on 24 July 2012 between the Tajik military and militants loyal to the former warlord Tolib Ayombekov, after Ayombekov was accused of murdering a Tajik general. On 18 May 2022, around 200 anti-government demonstrators, led by Mamadboqir Mamadboqirov, blocked a road in Rushon which led to the regional capital Khorog. The violent clashes between Tajiikistani military and the GBAO population in 2012, 2014, 2018, 2021 and in 2022 are peaks in the steady militarization of the region. Spectators assess these actions by the government as strategy to gain full political control over the formerly autonomous Gorno-Badakhshan, as well as over the informal opium trade, culminating in the assassination of several influential local leaders. This violates the Tajik peace accord.

In May 2022, Tajik government forces killed 40 civilians protesting against the torture and murdering of the youth representative Gulbiddin Ziyobekov. The Tajik interior ministry stated that the protestors attempted to "destabilise the social and political situation" in the region. Many of the protestors, but also journalists and human rights activists were detained in the subsequent cover-up. Additionally, the government seized properties and kidnapped even oppositional Pamiris abroad. Some human rights activists describe the situation as 'ethnic cleansing'. Genocide watch is stressing the polarization and the persecution of Pamiris through the government.

== Districts and geography ==
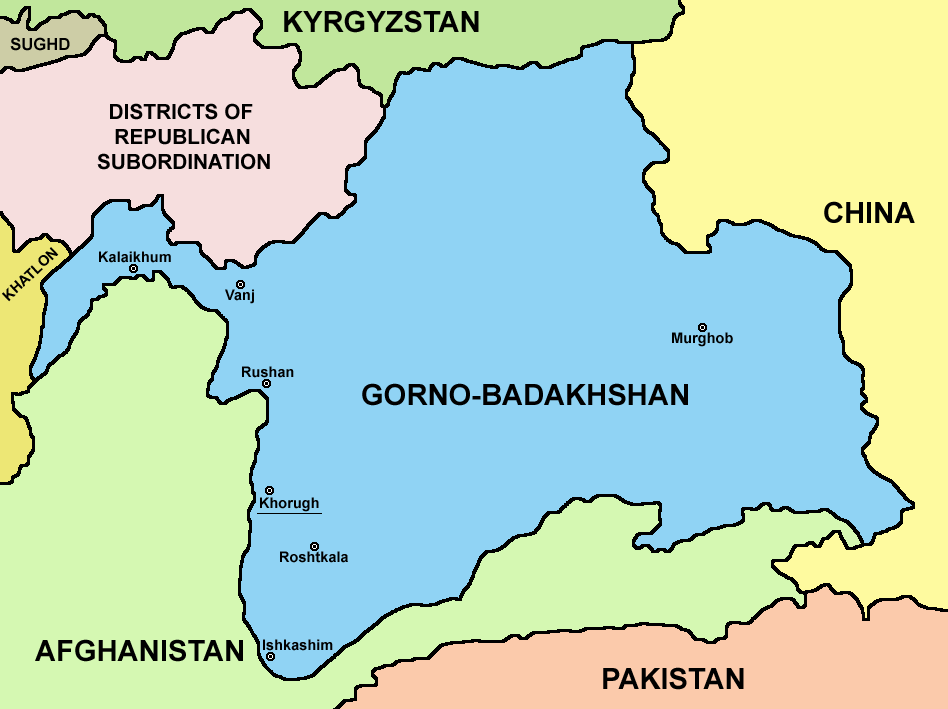
Map of Gorno-Badakhshan and surrounding territories

Darvoz District is the western "beak" of the province. West-central Gorno-Badakhshan is mostly a series of east–west mountain ranges separated by valleys of rivers that flow into the Panj. The districts correspond to the river valleys. Murghob District occupies the eastern half of the province and is mostly a desolate plateau with high mountains on the west.

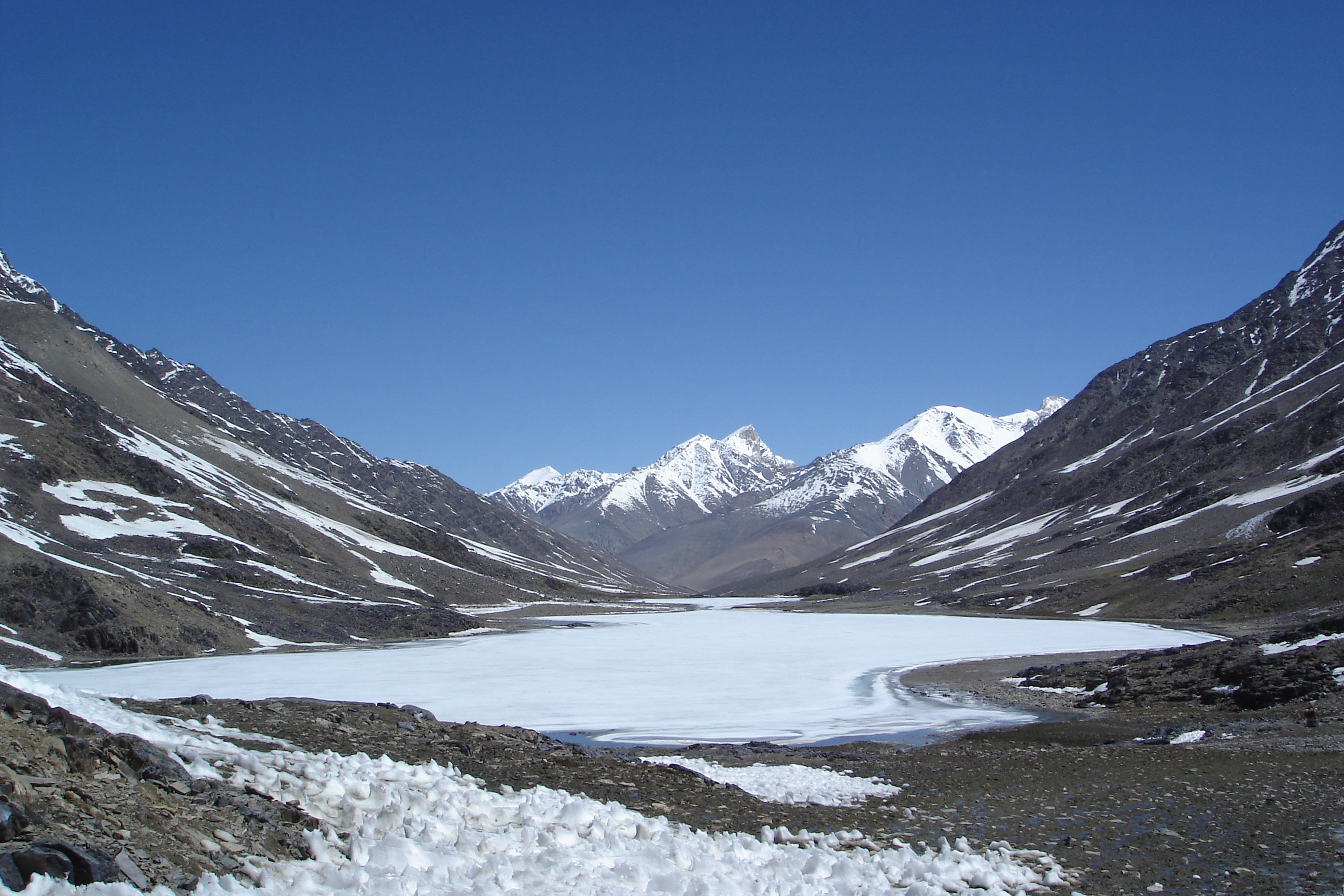
Takhtaqorum Pass

The districts of Gorno-Badakhshan are:

- Darvoz District (westernmost, north)
- Vanj District (west, north)
- Rushon District (west, center)
- Shughnon District (west, center)
- Roshtqal'a District (west, south)
- Ishkoshim District (west, southernmost)
- Murghob District (eastern two-thirds)

Gorno-Badakhshan covers the entire eastern part of Tajikistan and borders China's Xinjiang Uyghur Autonomous Region to the east, Afghanistan's Badakhshan Province to the south, and Kyrgyzstan's Osh Region to the north. Within Tajikistan, Gorno-Badakhshan's western border is with the Districts of Republican Subordination (DRP) and the tip of its southwestern finger (Darvoz District) borders Khatlon Region. The highest elevations in the region are in the Pamir Mountains (notably Mount Imeon), nicknamed "the roof of the world" by locals. Three of the five 7,000 meter summits in Central Asia are located here, including Ismoil Somoni Peak (formerly Communism Peak, and, before that, Stalin Peak; 7,495 m), Ibn Sina Peak (formerly Lenin Peak, and still known by that name on its Kyrgyz flank; 7,134 m), and Peak Ozodi (formerly Korzhenevskoi Peak, 7,105 m).

== Demographics ==
Historical population
Year	Pop.	±% p.a.
1979	126,783	—
1989	160,860	+2.41%
1999	206,004	+2.50%
2010	205,949	−0.00%
2020	228,900	+1.06%
Source: Citypopulation

The population living in Gorno-Badakhshan as of 2019 is estimated at 226,900. The largest city in Gorno-Badakhshan is Khorog, with a population of 30,300 (2019 est.); Murghob is the second largest, with about 4,000 residents.

According to the State Statistical Committee of Tajikistan, most inhabitants of Gorno-Badakhshan identify as Pamiris. The remainder of the population perceive themselves as either Kyrgyz or of other nationalities.

=== Languages ===
The de jure official languages of the Badakhshan (Gorno-Badakhshan) Mountainous Autonomous Region are Tajik as the state language and Russian as the interethnic language. Both languages are widely spoken in the region and most residents living in the Pamir are multilingual, as different languages are used in different situations.

Gorno-Badakhshan is home to a number of distinct languages and dialects of the Pamir languages group. The Pamiri language speakers represented in Gorno-Badakshan are speakers of Shughni, Rushani, Wakhi, Ishkashimi, Sarikoli, Bartangi, Khufi, Yazgulyam, and Oroshori. Vanji, formerly spoken in the Vanj River valley, became extinct in the 19th century. There is a sizable population of Kyrgyz speakers in the Murghab district. Many Eastern-Iranian languages spoken in Gorno-Badakhshan are on the endangered list of the UNESCO.

==== Linguistic discrimination ====
The Pamiris are increasingly being marginalized in linguistic and religious terms, as they deviate from the vision for nationhood of the Tajik state. Standard Tajik is used as an instrument of assimilation of smaller linguistic communities.

An inconsistently-enforced and now annulled 2010 law on language required all documents to be made available in Tajik and Russian; the caveat having been to produce such documents originally in Tajik. This created difficulties for the many inhabitants of Gorno Badakhshan who did not speak Tajik to access state services. In this context, Russian is perceived as a more neutral language and secularism can be seen as unequally applied. Facing this marginalization, Pamiris express their distinctive identity against western Tajiks along sectarian lines, even though there is considerable difference in ethnicity, religion and language amongst themselves.

=== Religions ===
The majority religion in Gorno-Badakhshan is Ismaili Shi'ite and adherence to the Aga Khan is widespread. Still, there are also Sunni Muslims in Gorno-Badakhshan. The Tablighi Jama’at, a Sunni missionary movement conducted da'wa in the 2000s. The government banned and persecuted this movement among others as part of their wider campaign against non-state Islam.

In 2009, the year of Hanafi Islam was celebrated, but the majority of Pamiris are followers of Ismaili Shia Islam. Subsequently, religious institutions had to be re-registered, leaving all institutions ousted that did not fit the state's religious beliefs.

== Government ==
=== Soviet era ===
The First Secretary of the Gorno–Badakhshan Regional Committee of the Communist Party of Tajikistan was the highest position in the region during the Soviet era.

==== List of first secretaries ====
Name	Term start	Term end
[data missing]	1925	1928
Konstantin Moiseyenko	1928	1930
Abdul Zennatshayev	1930	1934
[data missing]	1934	1939
Andrey Kuznetsov	1939	1941
Nikolay Rogatkin	1941	1945
Kurbonsho Gadoliyev	1945	1949
Ismail Burkhanov	1950?	1951
Rakhimbobo Tursunov	1951	1956
Nadzhmiddin Abdullayev	1956	1961
Grizi Dzhavov	1961	1963
Moyensho Nazarshoyev	July 1963	April 1970
Khushkadam Davlyatkadamov	April 1970	1978
Aloviddin Babayev	1978	1982
Mukhitdin Zairov	June 1982	11 April 1987
Soibnazar Beknazarov	11 April 1987	August 1991

=== Since independence ===
The chairman of the Badakhshan Mountainous Autonomous Region is the head of the regional government. They are appointed by the president of Tajikistan.

==== List of chairmen ====
Name	Term start	Term end
Alimamad Niyozmamadov	December 1994	25 November 2006
Kadyr Kasim (Note: Acting chairman until 12 February 2007)	25 November 2006	19 November 2013
Shodikhon Jamshedov	19 November 2013	2018
Yodgor Fayzov	2018	5 November 2021
Alisher Mirzonabot	5 November 2021	17 June 2026

== Transport ==
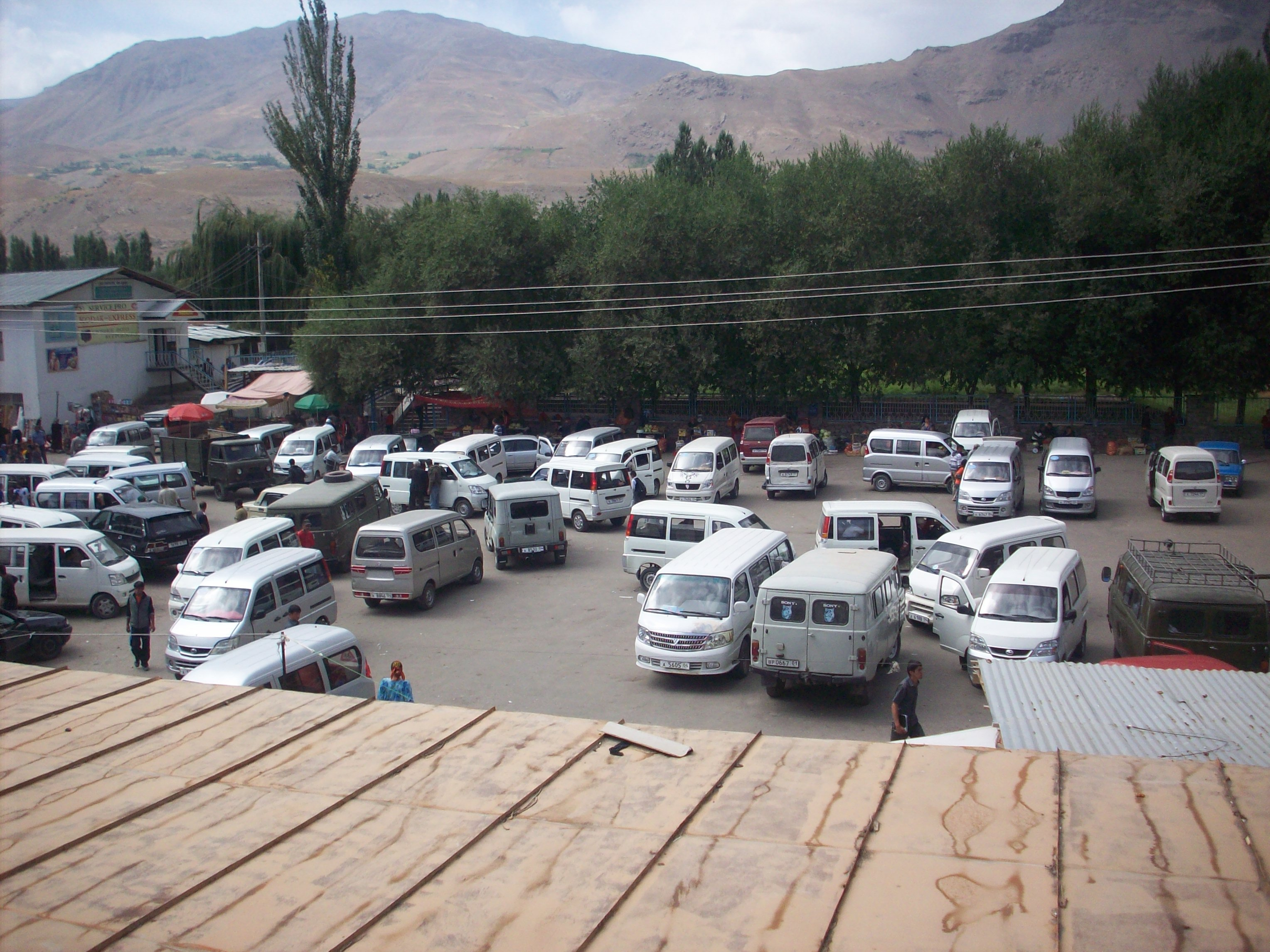
Marshrutka depot in Khorog

During the 20th century, the Soviet modernity project to establish roads connections in the Pamir led to the communities becoming part of a transit district between Osh, Khorog and Dushanbe. Nowadays, the routes Khorog–Osh and Khorog–Dushanbe are both segments of the Pamir Highway. A third road was constructed through the Kulma Pass in 2004 by China in order to connect Khorog to Tashkurgan. Gorno-Badakhshan is separated from the Pakistani territories of Khyber Pakhtunkhwa and Gilgit Baltistan by the narrow, but nearly impassable, Wakhan Corridor. Another road leads from Khorog to Wakhan and across the Afghan border.

Even though connectivity is promoted in Gorno-Badakhshan, as the "Golden gate of Tajikistan" local traders largely do not profit from the rise of trade. Instead logistic companies and elites from Dushanbe dominate the long-distance trade, as the Pamiris are increasingly excluded from central posts and have to obtain visas from Dushanbe to travel to China, which is very costly. In June 2022, after local protesters blocking the road were imprisoned, some even killed, a Chinese company started the modernization of a Pamir highway section at the cost of US$200 million.

== Energy ==
In 2019, the European Union and Germany, in coordination with Tajikistan, committed 37 million euros to finance the construction of an 11 MW run-of-the-river hydro power plant along the Shokhdara river. The project is intended to also supply energy to Badakhshan, Afghanistan.

== Sports ==
Khorog is the highest location where bandy has been played.

== Notable individuals ==
- Qimmatgul Aliberdiyeva
- Tolibbek Ayyombekov
- Savsan Bandishoeva
- Nobovar Chanorov
- Nazarsho Dodkhudoev
- Akbarsho Iskandrov
- Manuchehr Kholiqnazarov
- Davlat Khudonazarov
- Ulfatmo Mamadambarova
- Mirsaid Mirshakar
- Muboraksho Mirzoshoyev
- Muhammadboqir Muhammadboqirov
- Qozidavlat Qoimdodov
- Nuqra Rahmatova
- Shodi Shabdolov
- Sabzajon Shoismoilova
- Shirinsho Shotemur
- Khudoyor Yusufbekov
- Gurminj Zavkibekov

== See also ==
- Badakhshan
- Afghanistani Badakhshan
- Extreme points of Tajikistan
- Tajik National Park
- Badakhshan national football team
