= Shughnon District =

- District
- Russian: Шугнанский район Tajik: Ноҳияи Шуғнон
- Location of Shughnon District in Tajikistan
- Coordinates: 37°35′N 71°45′E
- Country: Tajikistan
- Region: Gorno-Badakhshan Autonomous Region
- Capital: Vahdat

Area
  - Total: 4,600 km^{2} (1,800 sq mi)

Population (2020)
  - Total: 38,000
  - Density: 8.3/km^{2} (21/sq mi)
- Time zone: UTC+5 (TJT)
- Postal code: 736100
- Area code: +992 355
- Official languages: Russian (Interethnic); Tajik (State)
- Website: shugnon.tj

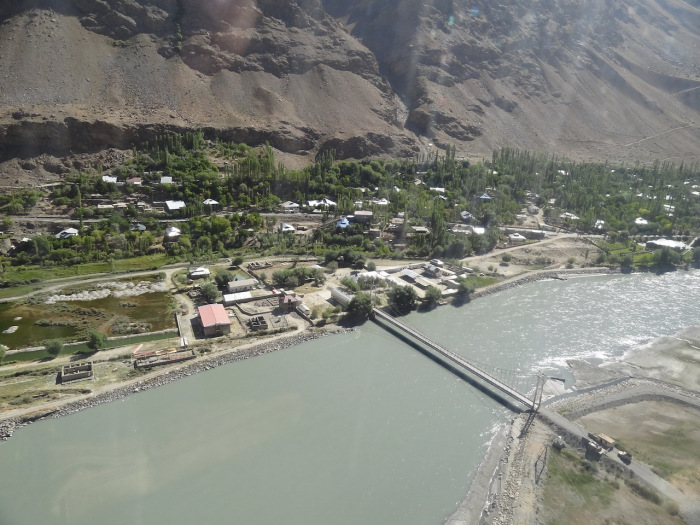
Friendship Bridge between Afghanistan and Tajikistan across the river Panj in Shughnon District

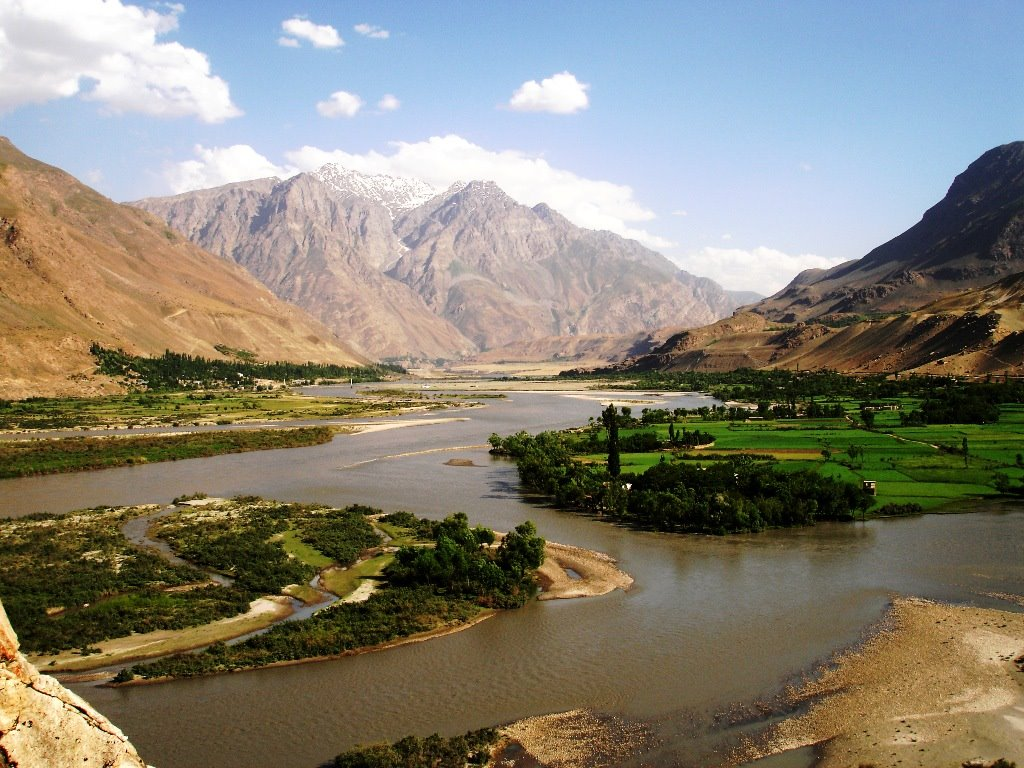
A view of the Panj, the border between Afghanistan and Tajikistan in Shughnon District

Shughnon District (Note: Russian: Шугнанский район, IPA: [ʂʊgˈnanskʲɪj rɐˈjɵn]; Tajik: Ноҳияи Шуғнон, romanized: Nohiyayi Shug‘non, IPA: [nɔhɪˈjaɪ ʃʊʁˈnɔn]; Shughni: Хуг̌ну̊н ноийа, romanized: Xuɣ̌nůn noiya, pronounced [χʊɣˈnɵn nɔɪˈja]) is a district in eastern Tajikistan, in the central-western part of Gorno-Badakhshan Autonomous Region (GBAO). It is bordered by the river Panj and Afghanistan on the west, the Rushan Range and Rushon District on the north, Murghob District on the east and the Shughnon Range and Roshtqal'a District on the south. It corresponds to the valley of the river Gunt. The district seat is the village Vahdat. The population of Shughnon District is 38,000 (1 January 2020 estimate).

== Administrative divisions ==
The district has an area of about 4,600 km^{2} (2,000 sq mi) and is divided administratively into seven jamoats. They are as follows:

Jamoat	Population (Jan. 2015)
Navobod	6,864
Porshinev	8,723
Shahbozov (Darmorakht)	2,759
Shirinjonov (Sokhcharv)	2,932
Suchon	8,436
Vanqal'a	5,575
Ver	4,891
