= Khorog =

Capital of Gorno-Badakhshan, Tajikistan

Khorog Хоруғ (Tajik) Хорог (Russian) Харағ (Shughni) Khorugh, Kharagh
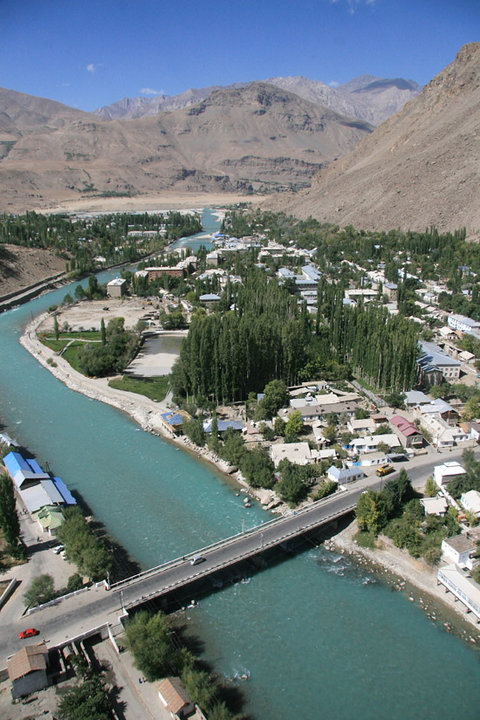
- Interactive map of Khorog
- Location of Khorog in Tajikistan
- Coordinates: 37°29′30″N 71°33′21″E
- Country: Tajikistan
- Region: Gorno-Badakhshan
- Established: 1932

Government
  - Mayor: Rizo Nazarzoda
- Elevation: 2,123 m (6,965 ft)

Population (2020)
  - Total: 30,500
- Time zone: GMT+5
- Postal code: 736000
- Area code: +992 3522
- Climate: BSk
- Official languages: Russian (Interethnic); Tajik (State)

Khorog (Russian: Хорог [xɐˈrok]), also Khorugh (Tajik: Хоруғ [χɔˈɾuʁ]) or Kharagh (Shughni: Харағ [χɐˈɾaʁ]), is the capital of Gorno-Badakhshan, Tajikistan. It is also the capital of the Shughnon District of Gorno-Badakhshan. It has a population of 30,500 (2020 est.).

Khorog is 2,200 metres (7,200 ft) above sea level in the Pamir Mountains (ancient Mount Imeon) at the confluence of the rivers Ghunt and Panj. The city is bounded to the south (Nivodak) and to the north (Tem) by the deltas of the Shakhdara and Ghunt, respectively. The two rivers merge in the eastern part of the city flow through the city, dividing it almost evenly until its delta in the Panj, on the border with Afghanistan. Khorog is known for its poplar trees that dominate the flora of the city.

== History ==
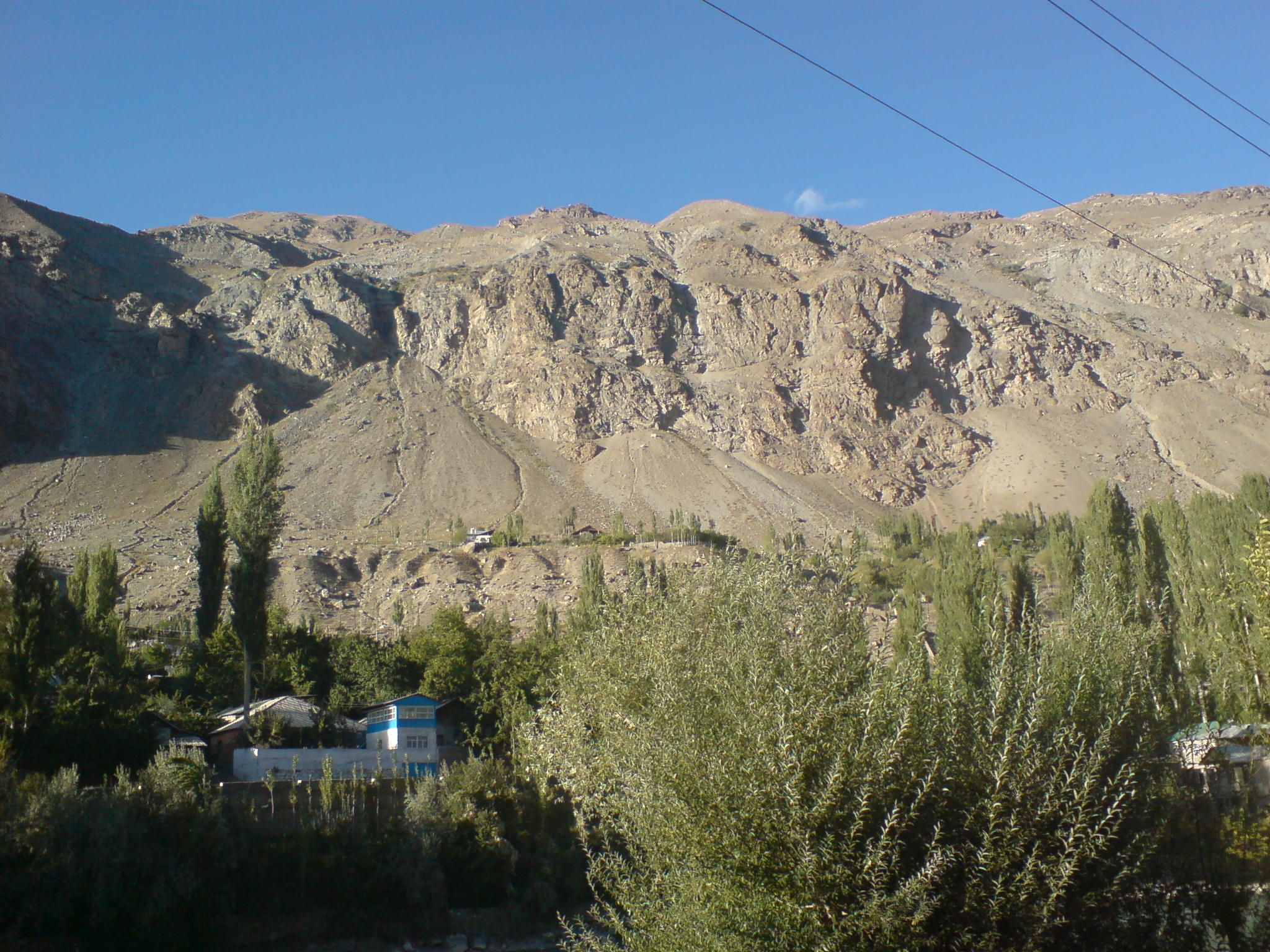
Typical scenery in the area

Until the late 19th century, Khorog was in an area disputed between the Emir of Bukhara, Shah of Afghanistan, Russia and Britain. The Russians emerged the winners of the region after The Great Game, which fixed the current northern border of Afghanistan on the Panj River and established the territory of Russian Pamir around Khorog.

Before 1896, when the Russians arrived and built a fort, the main town in the area was Kala-i Bar Panj (or Bar Panja Qal'a) somewhat downriver on the Afghan side. Following the fall of czarist Russia and the rise of the Soviet Union, Khorog became the capital of Gorno-Badakhshan in 1925. Soviet leaders encouraged the migration of settlers to the area with promises of pay, medals and automobiles, but with no industry and little arable land, the effort was not successful.

Khorog occupied headlines in July 2012 due to a government forces clash with guerrillas. Over 40 people, including 12 soldiers were killed (many reports indicated that the number of casualties could be higher). The country's security forces moved in to arrest suspects in the murder of secret services General Abdullo Nazarov. The alleged criminals were linked to former guerrilla leader-turned-border patrol commander Tolib Ayombekov. Ayombekov is alleged to have been involved in drug trafficking and the smuggling of tobacco and precious stones for many years. In 2014, 2018, 2021 and most recently in May 2022, Khorog was the scene of violent clashes and demonstrations against suspected human rights violations by security forces.

Pamir's botanical garden is the most popular view of Khorog. It was established in 1940 to test the survival rate of various plants in mountain climate conditions. More than 30,000 varieties of plants have been checked according to official statistics, which now covers around 4,000 types of garden collection. Located close to Khorog, the botanic garden of Pamir opens up a great panoramic view of the entire city.

== Facilities and education ==
Modern Khorog is one of the poorest areas of Tajikistan, with the non-profit Aga Khan Foundation providing almost the only source of cash income. However, the city does have its own university (Khorog State University, founded in 1992), twelve schools, and several hospitals. There is a museum, the Khorog Regional Museum, an Ismaili Centre, and the second-highest botanical garden in the world, the Pamir Botanical Garden.

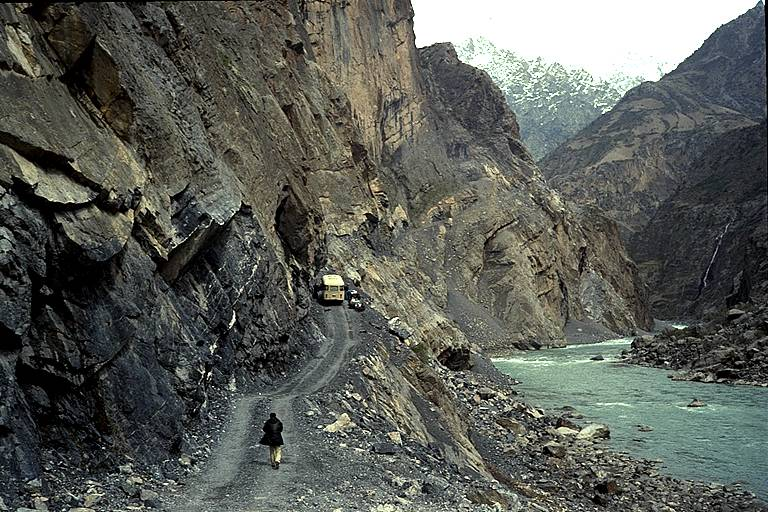
Along the Dushanbe–Khorog highway

Khorog is also host to the Aga Khan Lycee and one of the three campuses of the University of Central Asia. The university was founded in 2000 by the governments of Kazakhstan, the Kyrgyz Republic and Tajikistan, and The Aga Khan. It is the world's first internationally chartered institution of higher education. UCA has three Schools – School of Arts and Sciences, Graduate School of Development and the School of Professional and Continuing Education. The Khorog campus offers Bachelor of Arts and Bachelor of Science degrees in Global Economics and Earth and Environmental Sciences.

== Transportation ==
There is a bridge to the Afghan side of the river. Khorog is situated along the Pamir Highway at the point where it leaves the Panj valley and heads east up the Ghunt valley. The Pamir highway is the main road in Gorno-Badakhshan and connects the Tajik capital of Dushanbe toward the west to the Republic of Kyrgyzstan to the northeast.

The highway is very difficult to pass in both directions, especially during winter and spring. Khorog also has a small airport, which can accommodate smaller airplanes like AN-28 turboprop and the Yakovlev YAK-40, or helicopters. Currently, in 2026, there are weekly flights between Khorog and Dushanbe on Tajik Air's final AN-28.

== Climate ==
Khorog experiences a semi-arid climate (Köppen climate classification BSk) with cold, snowy winters and hot, dry summers.

Climate data for Khorog (1991–2020, extremes 1898–present)
Month	Jan	Feb	Mar	Apr	May	Jun	Jul	Aug	Sep	Oct	Nov	Dec	Year
Record high °C (°F)	9.7 (49.5)	12.6 (54.7)	21.6 (70.9)	30.2 (86.4)	35.0 (95.0)	36.6 (97.9)	39.0 (102.2)	38.2 (100.8)	36.0 (96.8)	29.5 (85.1)	20.5 (68.9)	14.0 (57.2)	39.0 (102.2)
Mean daily maximum °C (°F)	−1.4 (29.5)	1.2 (34.2)	7.6 (45.7)	16.2 (61.2)	21.9 (71.4)	26.8 (80.2)	30.2 (86.4)	30.4 (86.7)	26.3 (79.3)	18.3 (64.9)	10.3 (50.5)	2.3 (36.1)	15.8 (60.5)
Daily mean °C (°F)	−6.8 (19.8)	−3.8 (25.2)	2.8 (37.0)	10.5 (50.9)	15.1 (59.2)	19.3 (66.7)	22.7 (72.9)	22.8 (73.0)	18.2 (64.8)	10.7 (51.3)	4.2 (39.6)	−2.7 (27.1)	9.4 (49.0)
Mean daily minimum °C (°F)	−10.5 (13.1)	−7.6 (18.3)	−0.9 (30.4)	5.8 (42.4)	9.5 (49.1)	12.6 (54.7)	15.4 (59.7)	15.3 (59.5)	10.6 (51.1)	4.6 (40.3)	0.1 (32.2)	−6.0 (21.2)	4.1 (39.3)
Record low °C (°F)	−27.1 (−16.8)	−28.7 (−19.7)	−19.8 (−3.6)	−7.6 (18.3)	−1.3 (29.7)	1.9 (35.4)	2.2 (36.0)	5.4 (41.7)	1.5 (34.7)	−7.7 (18.1)	−13.2 (8.2)	−24.7 (−12.5)	−28.7 (−19.7)
Average precipitation mm (inches)	30 (1.2)	32 (1.3)	32 (1.3)	34 (1.3)	26 (1.0)	11 (0.4)	3 (0.1)	0.5 (0.02)	1 (0.0)	11 (0.4)	18 (0.7)	22 (0.9)	221 (8.7)
Average precipitation days	11.5	13.2	16.4	13.5	12.2	5.7	3.7	1.4	1.0	5.6	7.5	11.5	103.2
Average relative humidity (%)	72.2	70.7	61.8	51.6	52.8	48.0	43.9	40.7	43.8	54.3	60.1	64.9	55.4
Mean monthly sunshine hours	108	103	139	178	223	262	269	275	245	181	144	105	2,232
Source 1: Pogoda.ru.net, NOAA (sun 1961–1990)
Source 2: climatebase.ru (precipitation days, humidity)

== Notable people ==
The following is a list of well-known people who were born or brought up in Khorog:

- Oleg Fesov, prominent Pamiri musical artist
- Ulfatmo Mamadambarova, singer and musician and Honoured Artist of Tajikistan
- Muhammadboqir Muhammadboqirov, Tajik opposition politician killed in clashes with government forces in 2022
- Shodi Shabdolov, chairman of the Communist Party of Tajikistan from 1991 to 2016

== Sports ==
Khorog is the locality of highest altitude where bandy has been played.

There is also a football team, called FC KhorogCity.

== Photo gallery ==
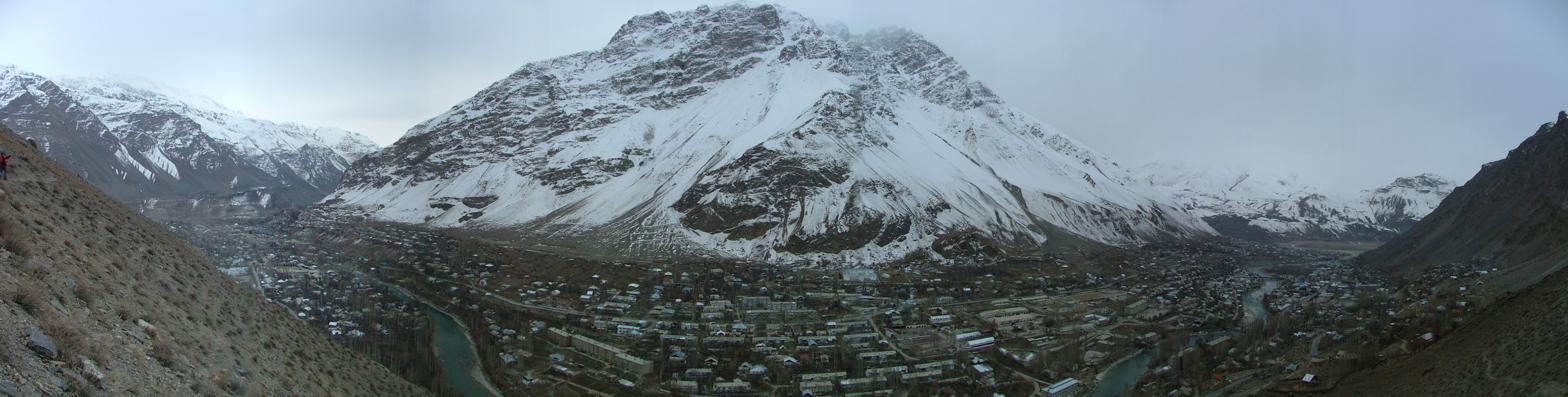
Panorama of Khorog from the north

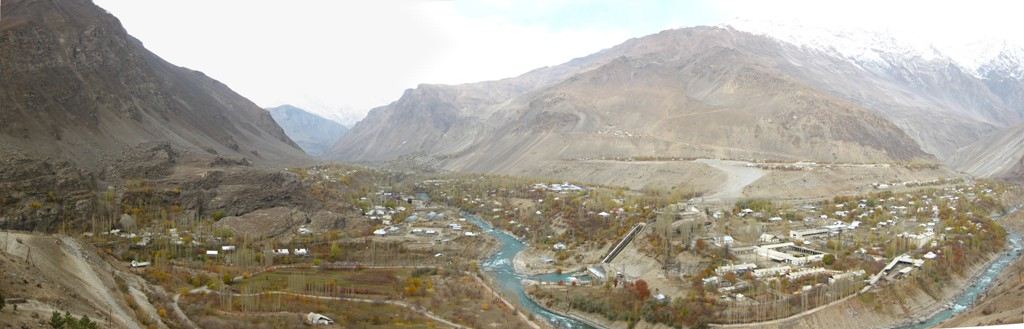
Panorama of Khorog from the east
