= Subligaculum =

Undergarment worn in Ancient Rome

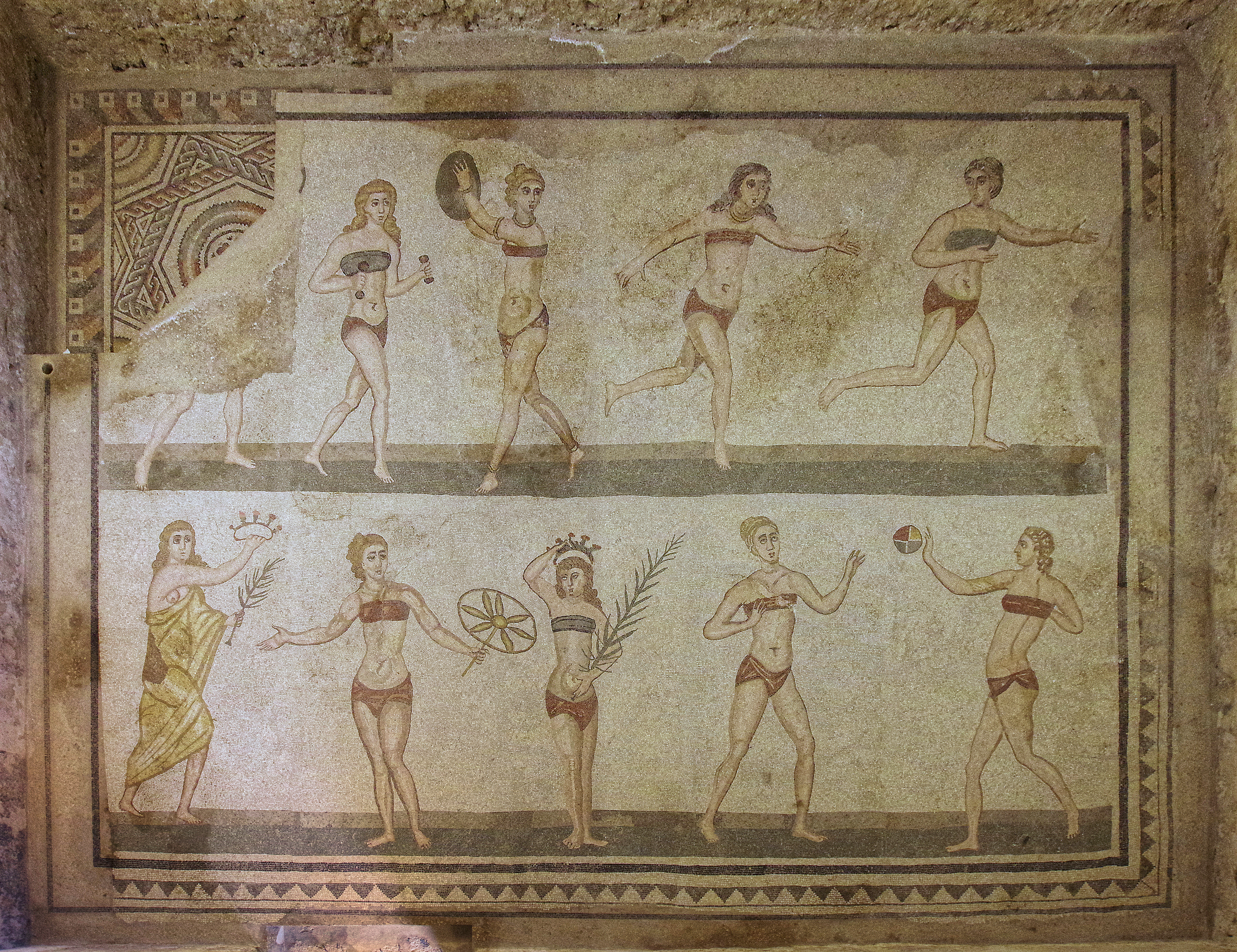
- Female athletes wearing a bikini-like combination of a subligaculum and a very strophium (breast-cloth) (Sicily, c. 300 AD)
- Type: Undergarment

A subligaculum was a kind of underwear worn by ancient Romans. It could come either in the form of a pair of shorts, or in the form of a simple loincloth wrapped around the lower body. It could be worn both by men and women. In particular, it was part of the dress of gladiators, athletes, and actors on the stage. Leather subligacula have been found in excavations of 1st century Roman London.

== Design and Function ==
The longer-form subligaculum that forms a loin cloth is tied as follows: First, the strings are tied around the waist with the long part hanging down back, covering the buttocks. Next, the long part is brought down between the legs and pulled up behind the knot tied in front. Then it is draped over the ties so it forms a loincloth.

== Use by Gladiators ==
The subligaculum undergarment was commonly worn by Roman Gladiators, particularly the provocator, one of the more traditional types. This challenger-class fighter, active from the Republic into Imperial times, typically wore the subligaculum along with standard gear like a visored helmet, a single greave on the left leg, and minimal armour. The subligaculum was a functional and essential part of a gladiator’s attire, offering modesty and freedom of movement in combat.

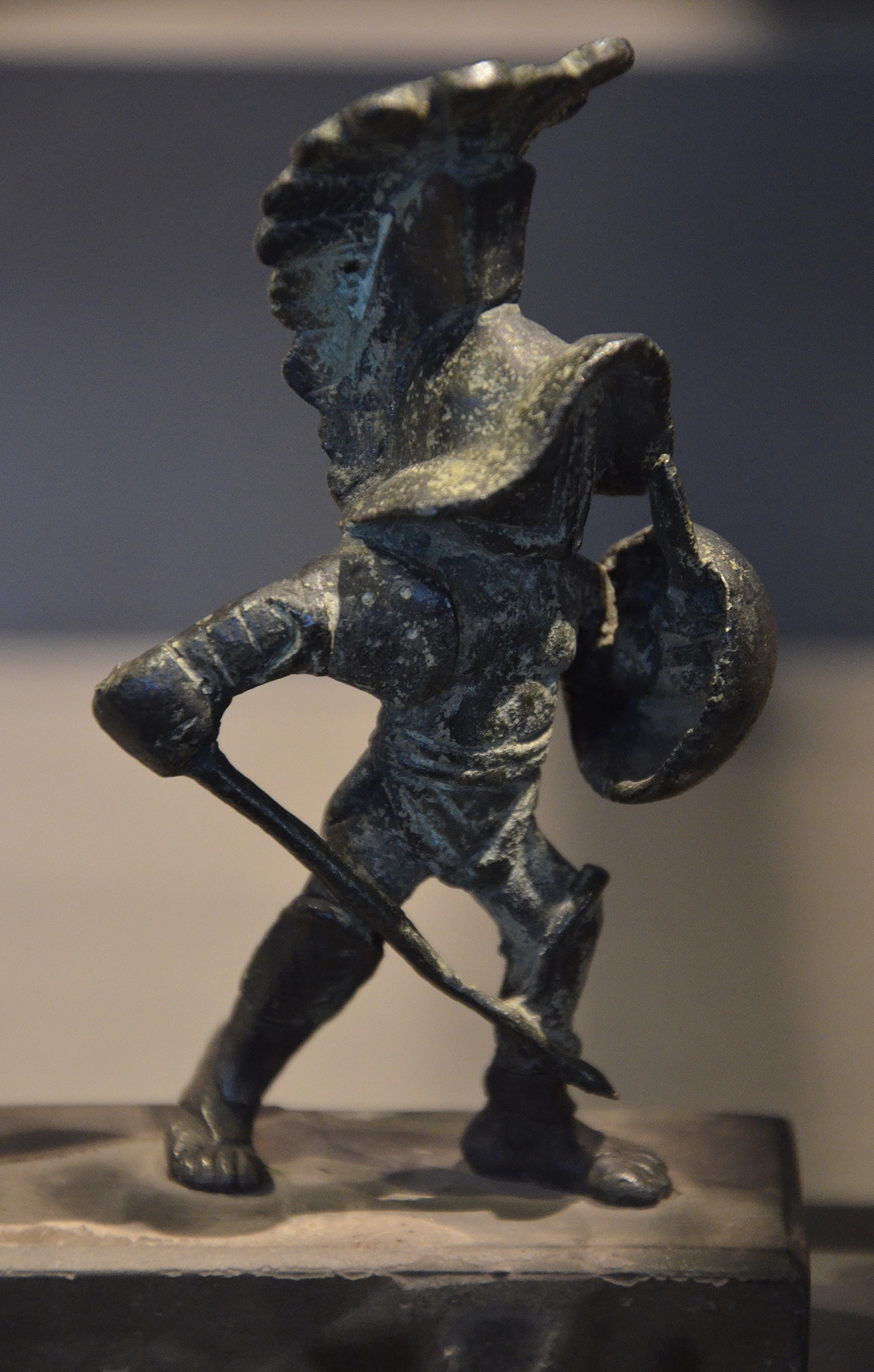
A statuette of a Hoplomachus (pl. hoplomachi) gladiator in ancient Rome, armed to resemble a Greek Hoplite (soldier with heavy armor and helmet, a round shield, a spear and a sword) wearing a bronze helmet, a manica on his right arm, loincloth (subligaculum).

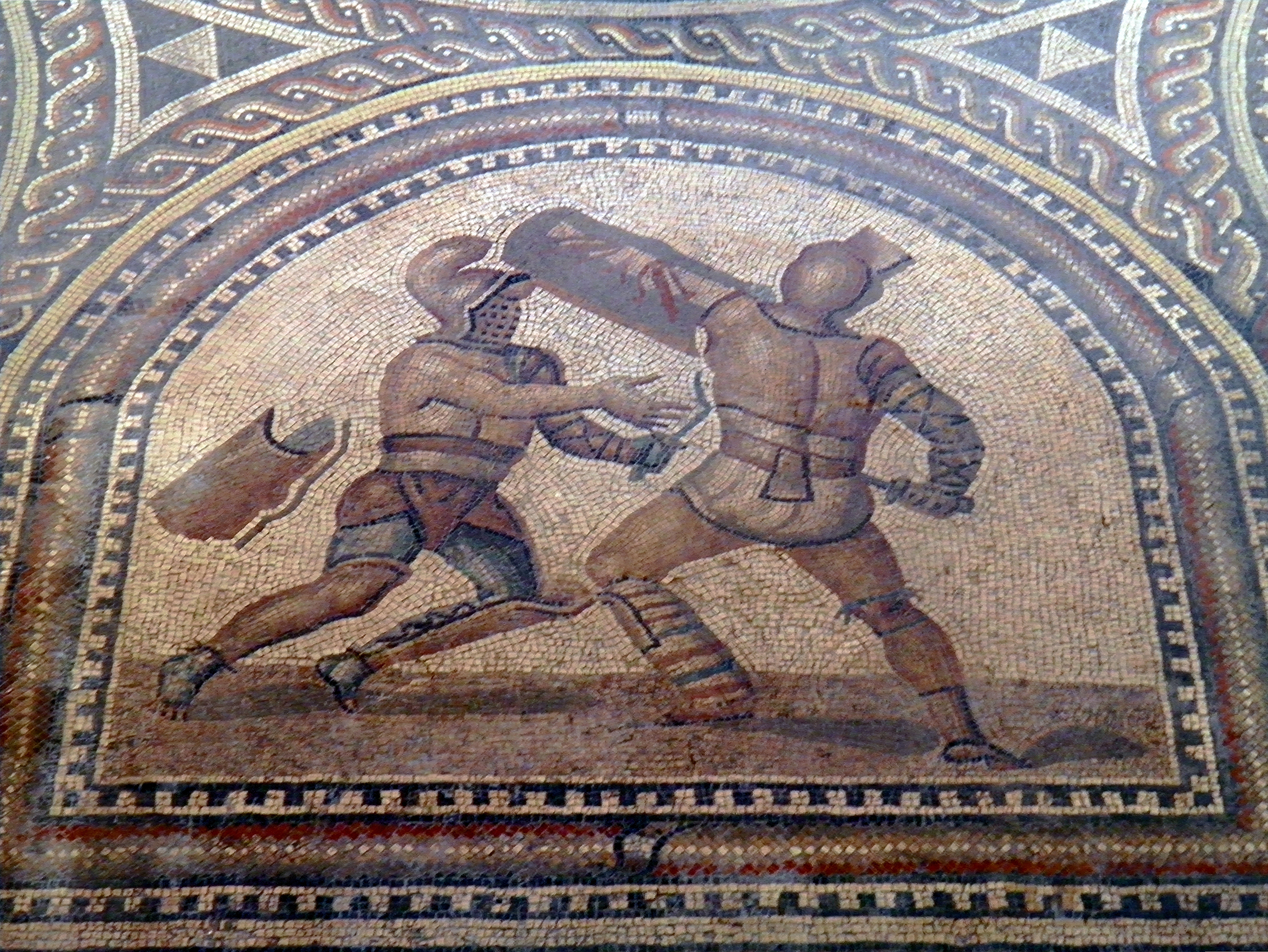
Detail of Gladiator mosaic showing a Thraex and a Murmillo gladiator fighting, each wearing distinct armor and Subligaculum loincloth.

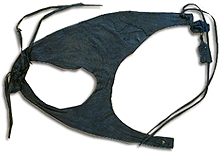
Bikini-like leather subligaculum found in excavations of Roman London (Museum of London)

== See also ==
- Dhoti
- Fundoshi
- Kacchera
- Kaupinam
- Loincloth
- Lungi
- Mawashi
- Perizoma
- Temple garment
- Thong
