= Perizoma (loincloth) =

Type of loincloth

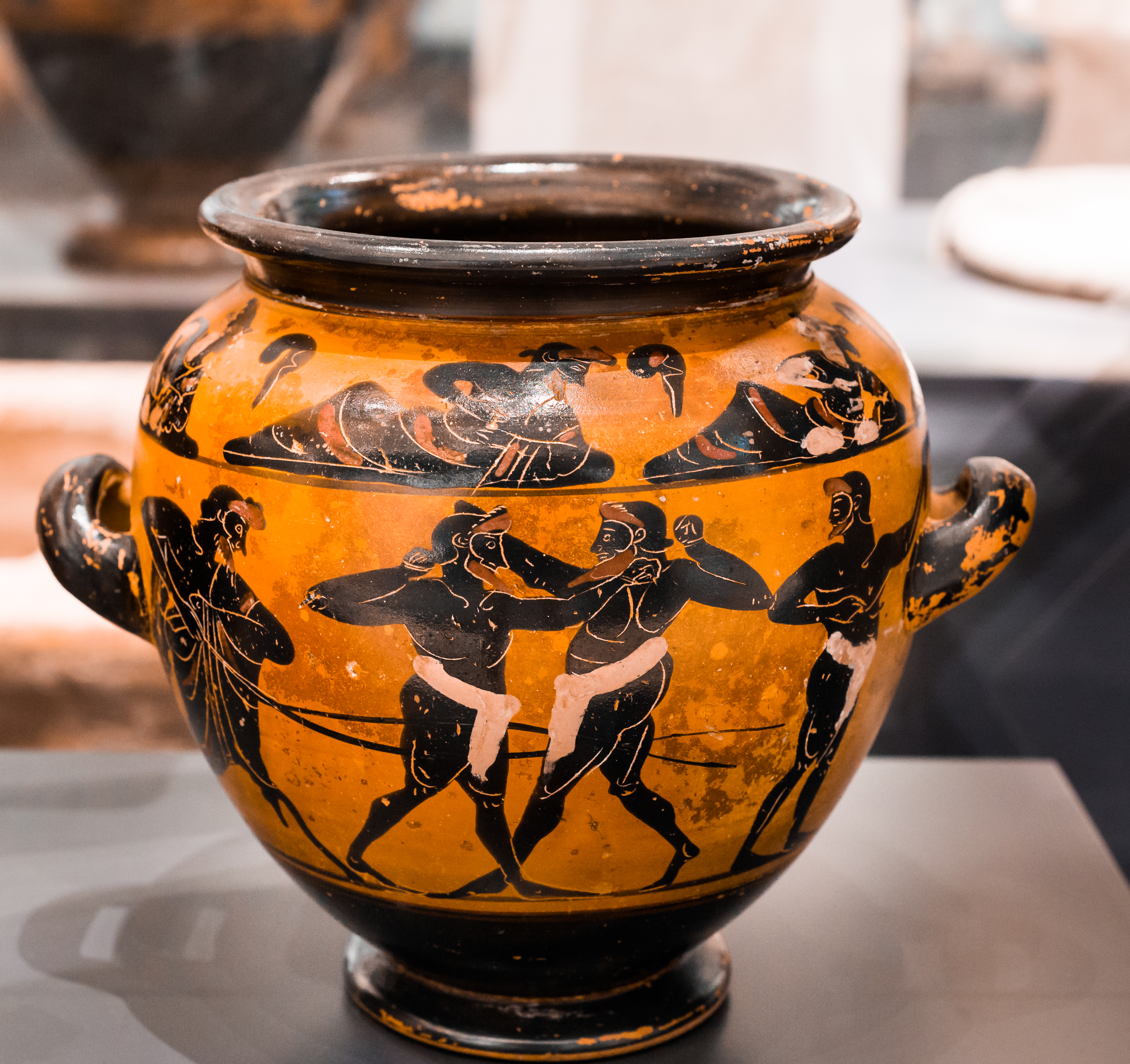
Greek athletes wearing perizoma loincloths boxing

Perizoma (Greek περίζωμα, plural; perizomata) is a type of loincloth that was worn in Ancient Greece. The perizoma was typically worn by manual laborers or athletes. This garment could be worn independently or with a short chiton or even underneath a longer chiton. Homer references the perizoma in his epic The Iliad underscoring its role in ancient Greek dress.

The perizoma is thought to have originated with the Minoan civilization in Crete. Surviving depictions show it being worn by male and female acrobats (for example, in the Bull-Leaping Fresco).

A perizoma was possibly worn by Jesus during his crucifixion. It is a standard feature of the crucifixion in the arts. However, the Roman custom was to crucify victims naked, and there is no evidence to suggest that Jesus was an exception. Perizoma was likely added by later artists to preserve modesty (see fig leaf) and first appeared in the 8th century. Aachen Cathedral claims to have the actual relic of the perizoma, preserved inside the Marienschrein reliquary.

== Etymology ==
The word perizoma is derived from peri "around, about" and zoma "loin-cloth, drawers, band, belt"

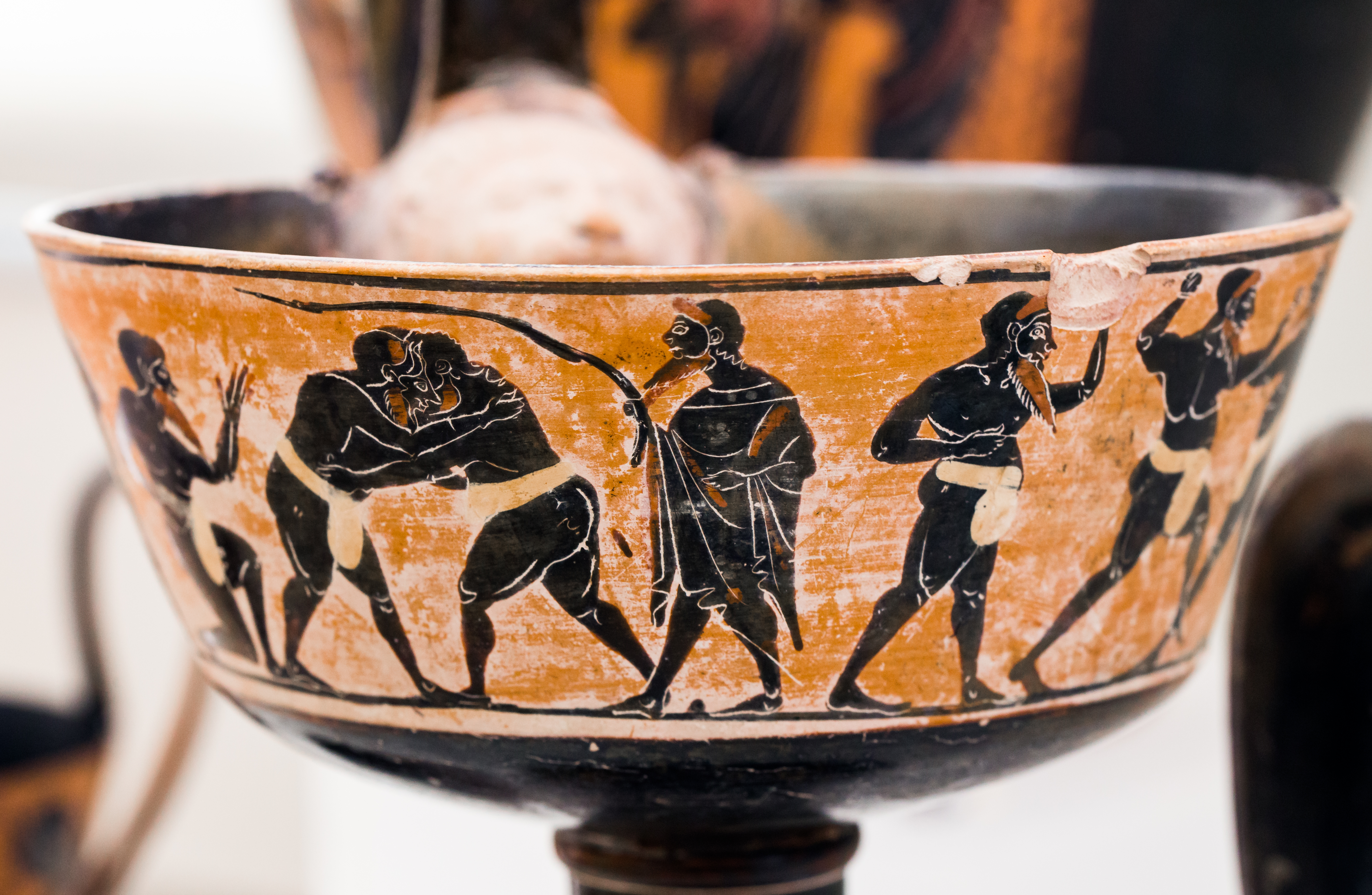
Athletes in perizomata (boxers, wrestlers, runner, jumper, diskobolos, acontist) and draped bearded trainers with switch

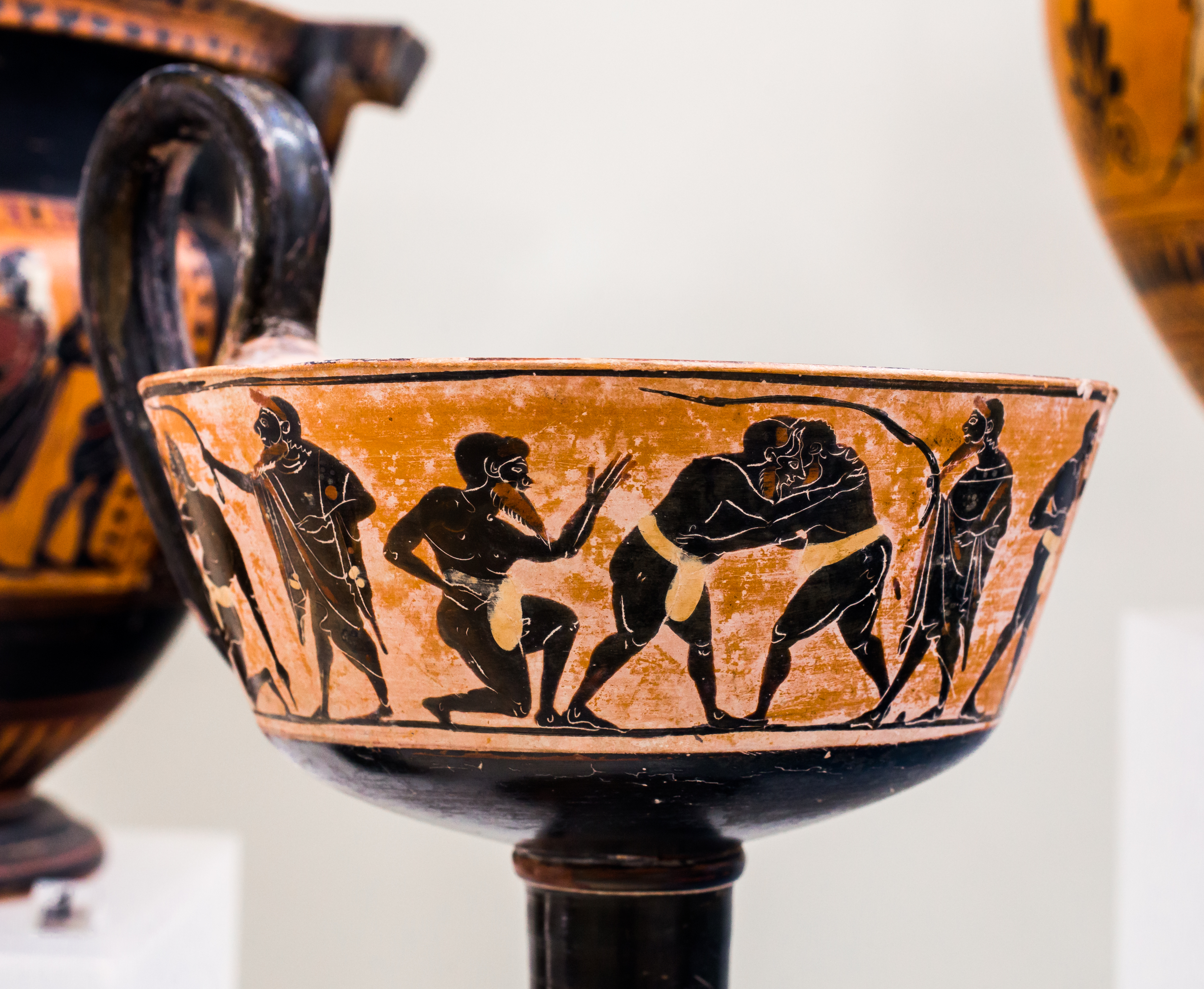
Bearded Greek athletes in perizomata (boxers, wrestlers, runner, jumper, diskobolos, acontist) and draped bearded trainers

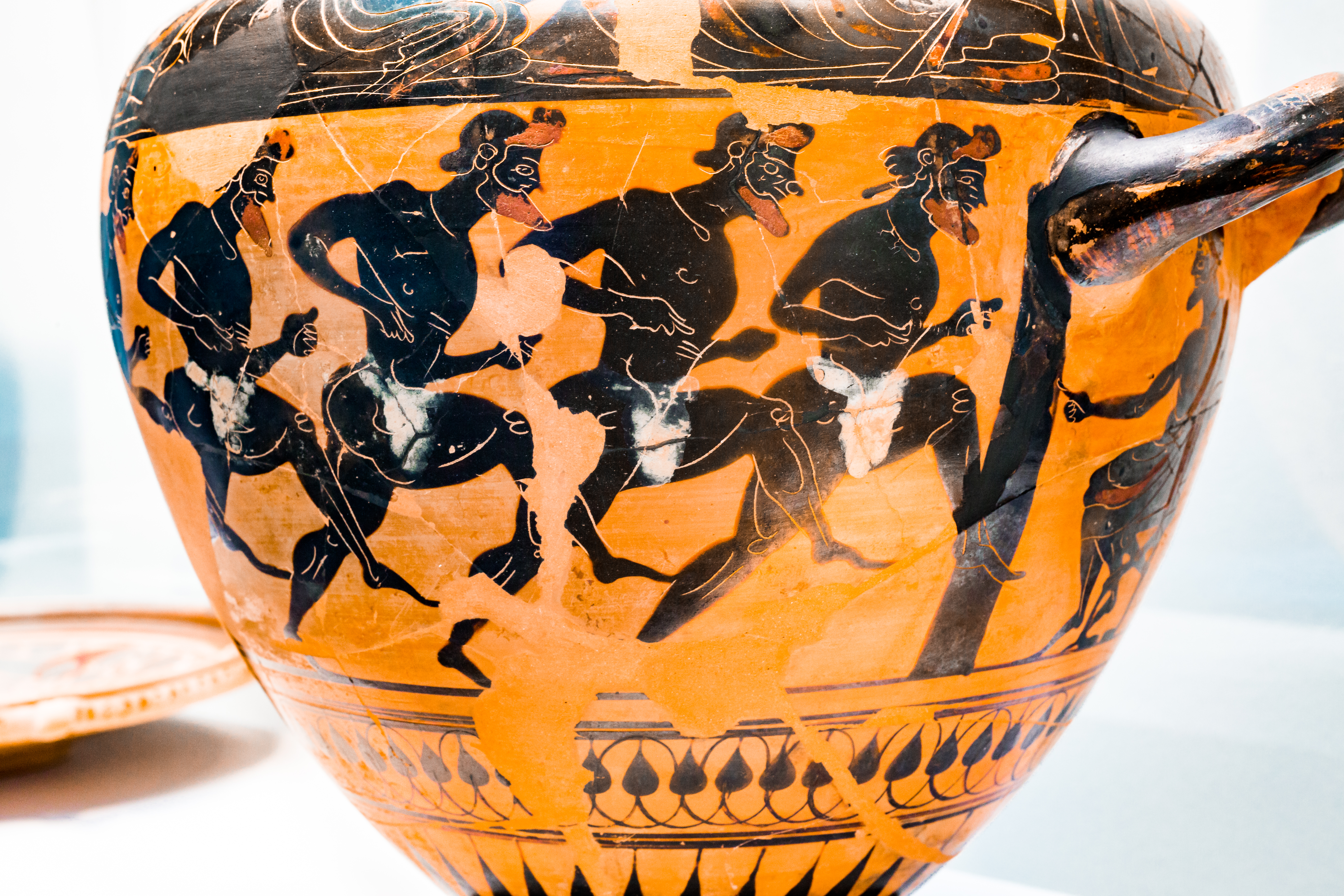
Bearded Greek athletes wearing perizomata running

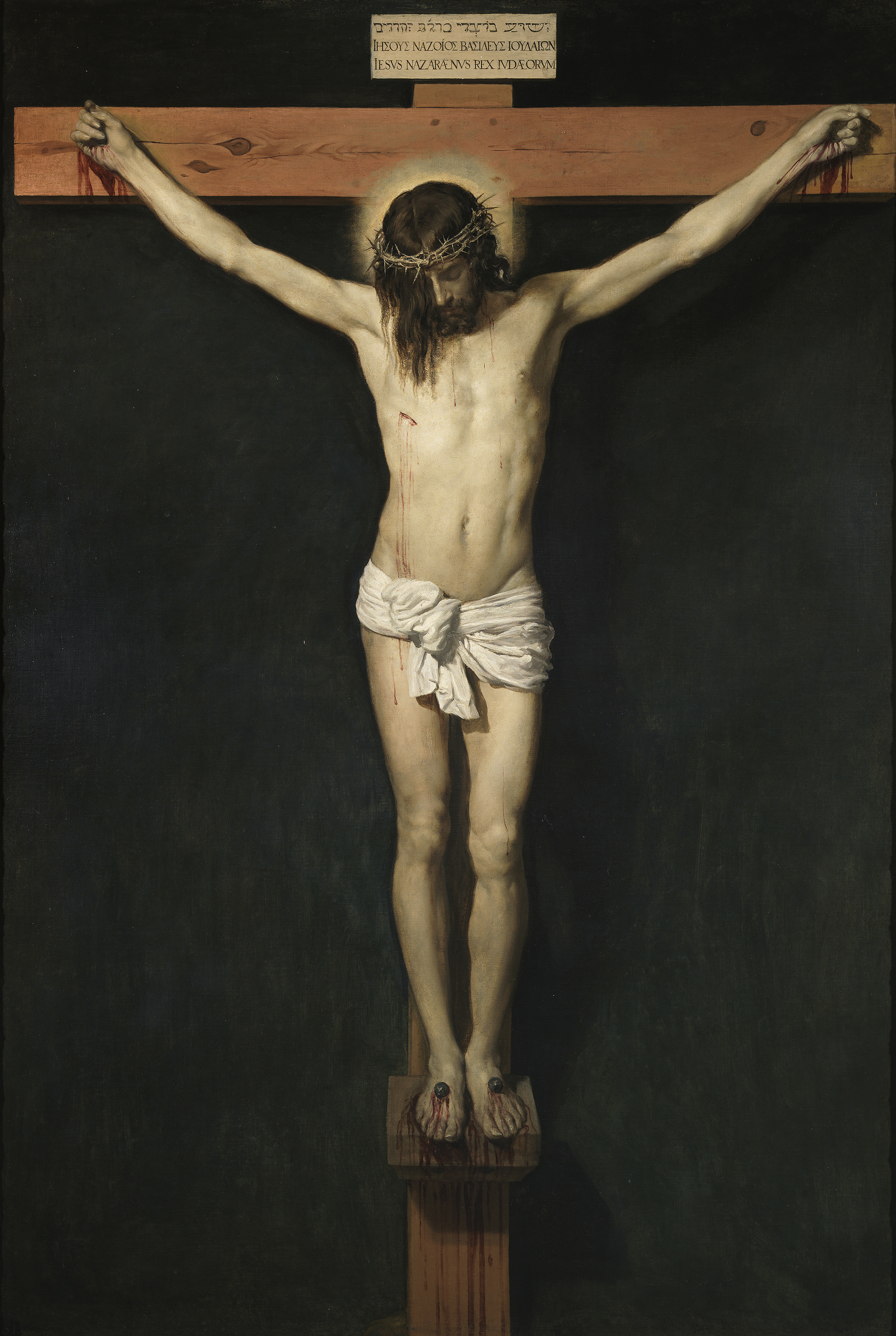
Christ Crucified by Diego Velázquez shows Jesus wearing a perizoma

== See also ==
- Dhoti
- Fundoshi
- Kacchera
- Kaupinam
- Loincloth
- Lungi
- Mawashi
- Subligaculum
- Temple garment
- Thong
