= Fundoshi =

Traditional Japanese undergarment

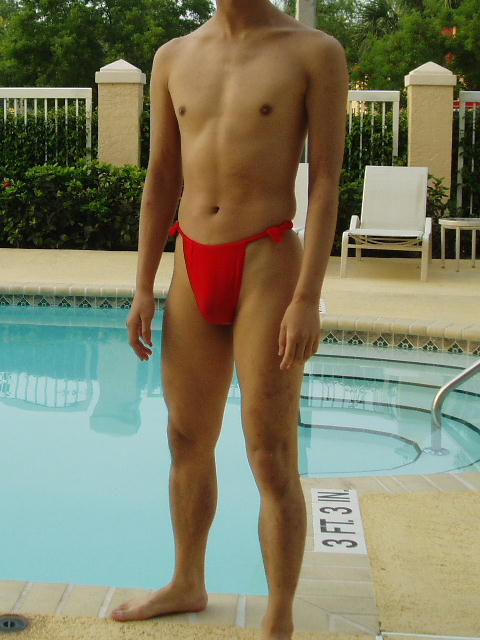
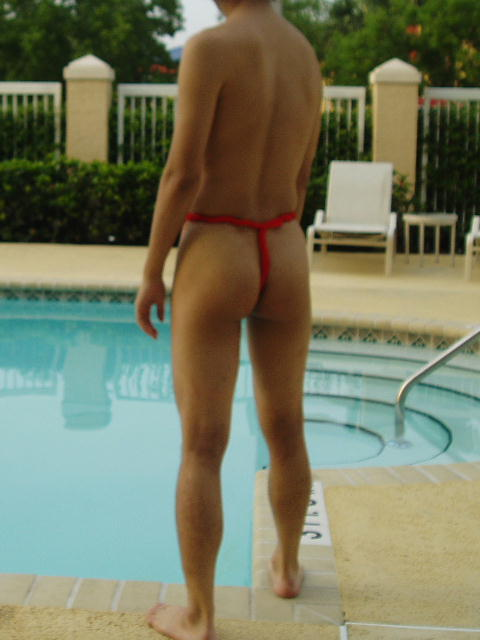
A man wearing a red rokushaku fundoshi (front and back)

Fundoshi (ふんどし/褌) is a traditional Japanese undergarment made from a length of cotton. Before World War II, it was the main form of underwear for Japanese men, boys, women and girls, but fell out of use quickly after the war with the introduction of new underpants to the Japanese market, such as briefs, boxer briefs and panties. Nowadays, the fundoshi is mainly used not as underwear but as festival (matsuri) clothing at Hadaka Matsuri or, sometimes, as swimwear.

== Types and uses ==
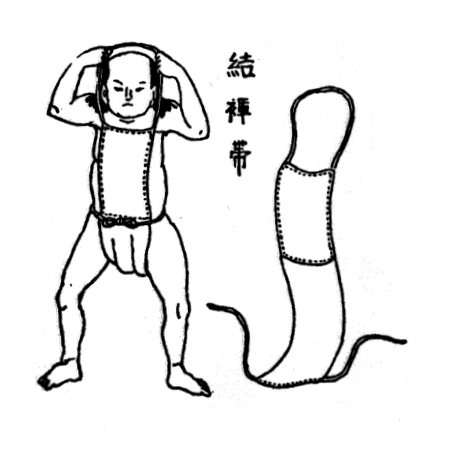
An Edo period wood block print of a samurai putting on a fundoshi

Japanese courier in Fundoshi in early Meiji period

The fundoshi is first mentioned in the classic Japanese history text, the Nihon Shoki. They are also depicted on clay figurines, haniwa. The fundoshi was the underwear of choice for all males regardless of age, wealth or social status, as well as ama divers. This changed after the Second World War, when Americanization popularized elasticized undergarments. There are several types of fundoshi, including rokushaku, kuroneko, mokko and etchū.

Fundoshi are worn in several basic styles depending upon how they are wrapped around the body. The most relaxed type consists of a strip of cloth, wound around the hips, secured at the small of the back by knotting or twisting, with the excess brought forward between the legs, and tucked through the cloth belt in front to hang as an apron.

The rokushaku fundoshi (Japanese: 六尺ふんどし／六尺褌) is traditionally favored as activewear. Its name is derived from its traditional measurements of a cloth that is six ("roku") shaku (1.818 m (5 ft 11.6 in)) long and one shaku (30.3 cm (11.9 in)) wide. It is formed by winding the cloth around the hips, then bringing the excess length back between the legs to twist around the belt cloth at the back. The fundoshi is often twisted to create a thong effect at the back. This was worn as the standard male bathing suit. Male children were often told to wear this kind of fundoshi because a boy in trouble could be easily lifted out of the water by the back cloth of his fundoshi.

The third style, called Etchū fundoshi (Japanese:越中褌), originated from Etchū Province (now Toyama Prefecture). Etchū fundoshi is a long rectangle of cloth; however, it has a strip of material at the waist to form a fastening or string. The dimensions are 14 inches (360 mm) width by about 40 inches (1,000 mm) length, and it is tied with the material strip in front of the body. The wearer ties the tapes around the hips, with the cloth at the small of the back, and then pulls the cloth between the legs and through the belt, letting the remainder hang as an apron. Such fundoshi was issued to Japanese troops in World War II, and often were the sole garb of Allied POWs in tropical areas. Common materials for fundoshi include white linen or white cotton; silk crepe may be used according to one's taste, but plain silk is not suitable. In winter it may be lined with similar material, but in other seasons it is always single. Both ends (or front and back) are hemmed to put cords through. One of the cords forms a loop to suspend the front end from the neck, and the other secures the back end by being tied in the front.

=== Variations ===
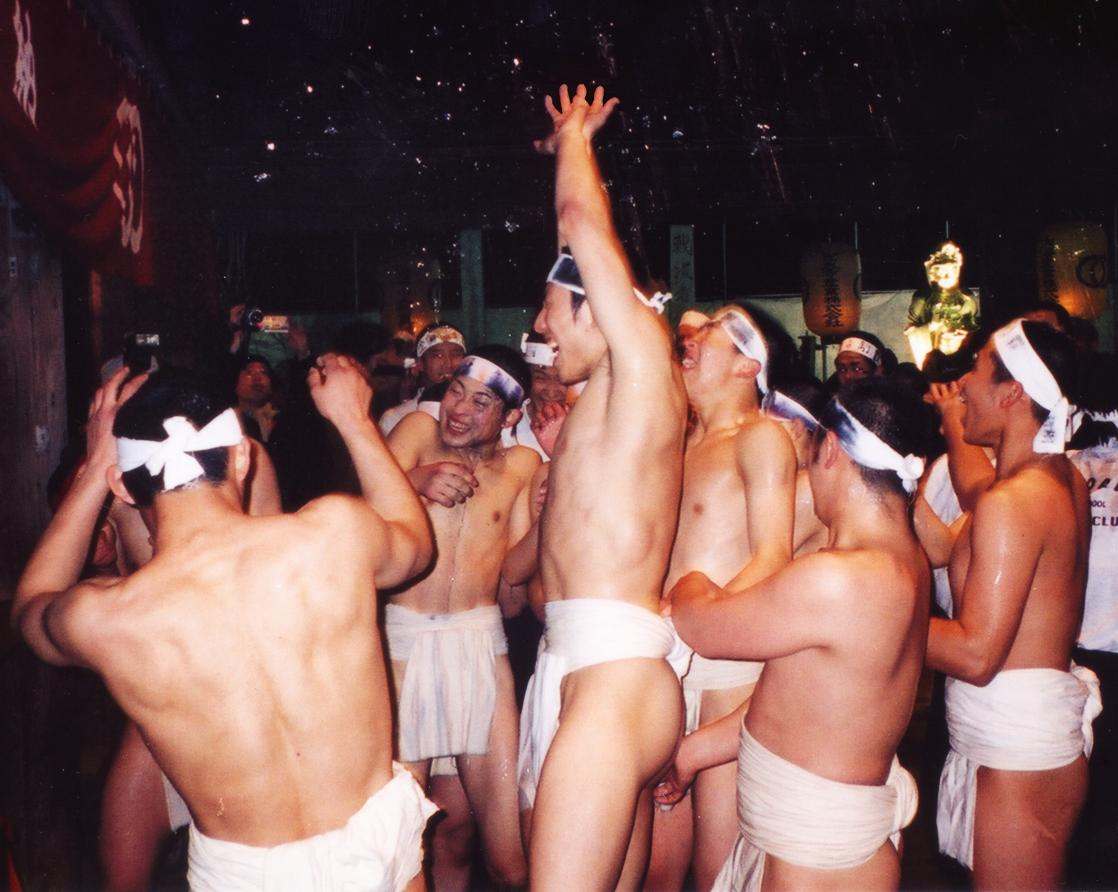
Participants receiving purification by water at the Hadaka Matsuri in Okayama

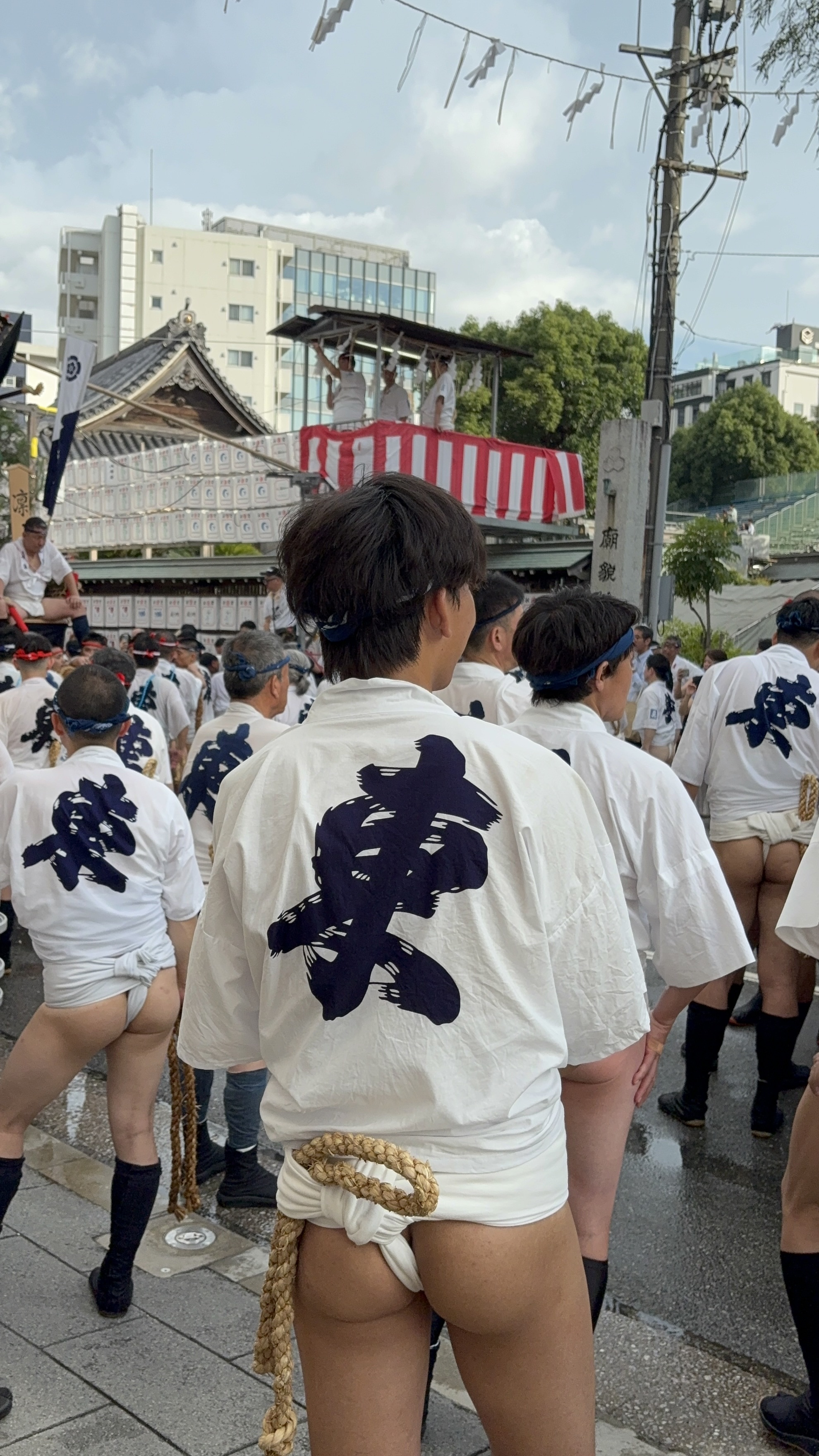
Participants at the Hakata Gion Yamakasa in Fukuoka

There are many other varieties of fundoshi as there are many variations on the principle of a loincloth. For example, the mokko-fundoshi (literally "earth-basket loincloth" because it looks like the traditional baskets used in construction), is made like the Etchū-fundoshi but without a front apron; the cloth is secured to the belt to make a bikini effect. The kuro-neko fundoshi (literally "black cat fundoshi") is like the mokko-fundoshi except that the portion that passes from front to back is tailored to create a thong effect. Fundoshi are not typically worn as everyday clothing. Fundoshi is mainly worn on specific, traditional occasions, particularly when participating in Hadaka Matsuri. During February, nearly 10,000 men will gather at Saidaiji Temple in Okayama wearing only fundoshi to participate in the festival in hopes of gaining luck for the entire year.

Samurai wore fundoshi as underwear with armor, combined with a shitagi shirt. Sumo wrestlers also wear a form of this garment, the mawashi. Fundoshi are often worn with a hanten or happi (a short cotton jacket with straight sleeves) during summer festivals by carriers of mikoshi (portable shrines) in Shinto processions. Outside Japan, it is perhaps best known from drumming groups Ondekoza and Kodo, whose members appear dressed in only white fundoshi and headbands. Fundoshi is sometimes used as traditional swimsuits. In some high schools, boys swim wearing fundoshi; incumbent Emperor of Japan Naruhito also swam in fundoshi in his childhood.

In late 2008, Wacoal began marketing fundoshi for women and have had greater than expected sales. These loincloths come in seven different colors and two designs—plain and chequered.

== Cultural comparisons ==
The Japanese idiom "fundoshi o shimete kakaru" ('tighten your loincloth') means the same as the English phrase "roll up your sleeves" or even more accurately "gird up your loins"—in other words, get ready for some hard work. The Japanese idiom "tanin no fundoshi" (literally, 'anyone else's fundoshi') is often used in a cautionary context about borrowing or using tools or materials belonging to someone else, the meaning extended to that of profiting at another's expense or taking risks with someone else's money.

== See also ==
- List of Japanese clothing
- Hadaka Matsuri (裸祭り, naked festival)
- Mawashi, loincloth worn in sumo wrestling
- Ondekoza
- Kodō
- Dhoti
- Kacchera
- Kaupina
- Kaupinam
- Loincloth
- Lungi
- Mawashi
- Perizoma
- Subligaculum
- Temple garment
- Thong
