= Kaupinam =

Undergarment

The kaupinam, kovanam, kaupina, langot, or lungooty is a loincloth worn by men in the Indian subcontinent as underclothing. It is still commonly worn in South Asia by pehlwans (wrestlers) while exercising or sparring in a dangal. It is basically a rectangular strip of cloth used to cover the genitals, with strings connected to the four ends of the cloth, for binding it around the waist and between the legs.

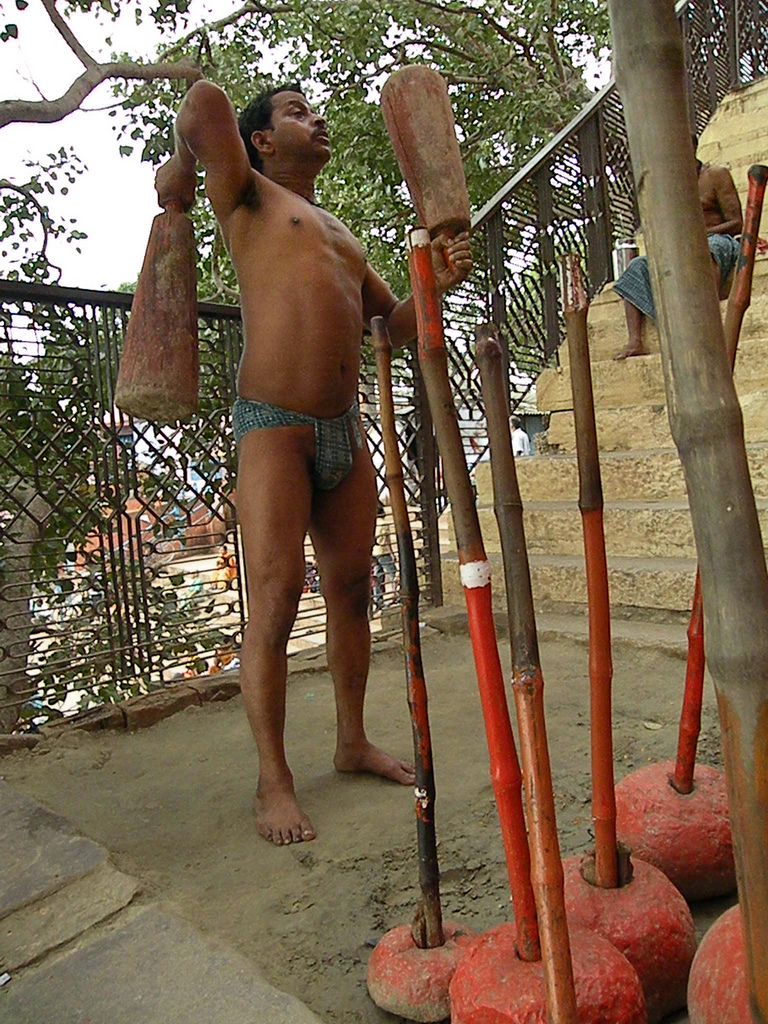
A pehlwan sports a langoti at an akhara

The short type of lungooty worn by naga sadhus or babas often leaves the buttocks bare, it is also known as ''coopees''.

== Use ==
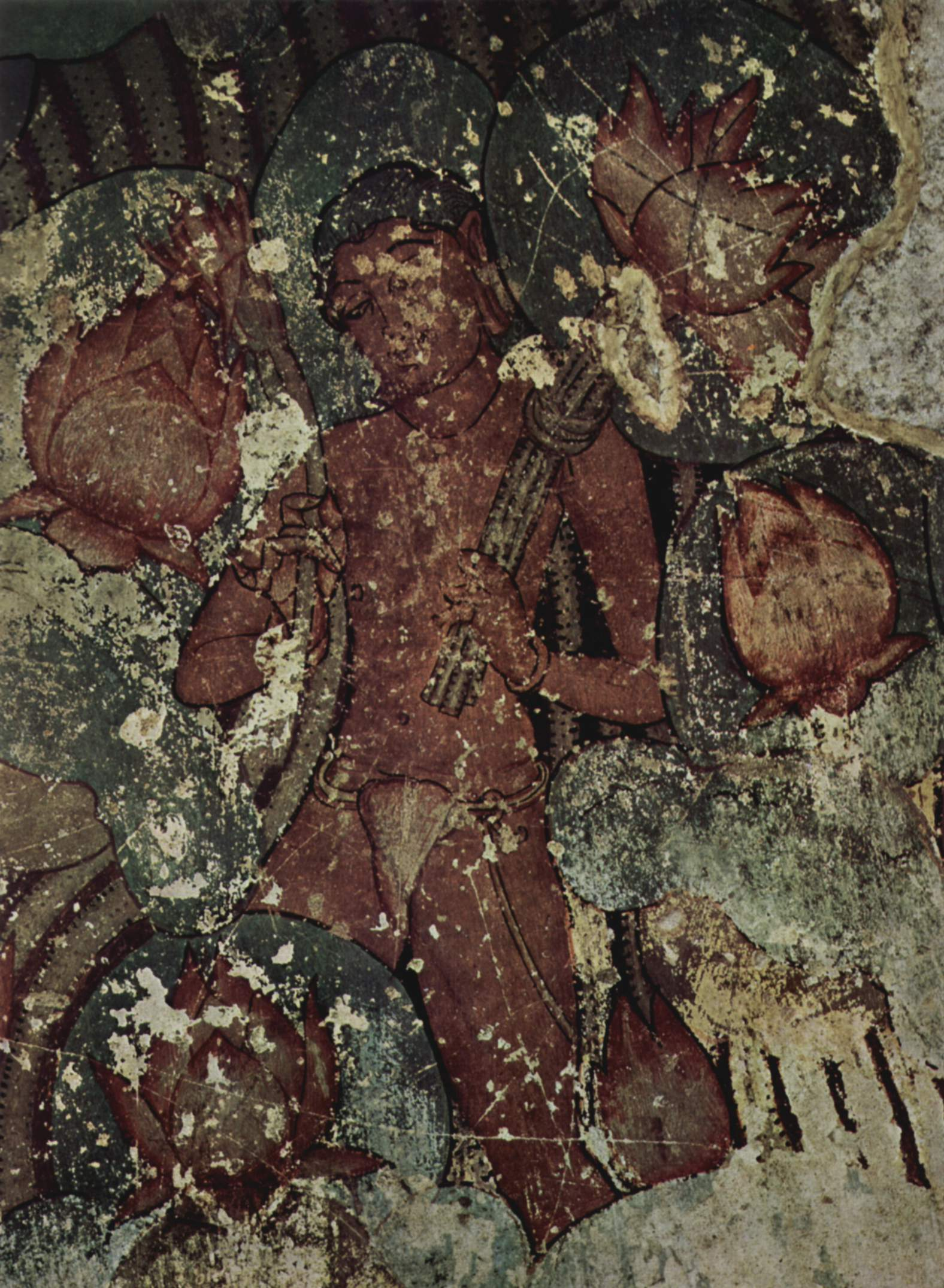
Painting depicting youth in kaupina harvesting lotus in pond, circa 850 CE.

It is still used extensively by Kalaripayattu (martial artists), bodyguards (ang-rakshaks) and wrestlers (pehelwans) in rural India, especially in games of Malla-yuddha and the medieval variation Pehlwani (a form of sparring from West Asia and South Asia). It is also worn during fitness training & sports coaching (kasrat); by men performing any form of physically straining activity and weight lifting such as farming.

Langot is a male sports gear and undergarment, associated with almost every form of physically straining sports like kushti and kabaddi of Indian traditions. It has been worn by henchmen and sportsmen during practices and sessions, in a similar way to the contemporary use of gym shorts and jock briefs since ancient times. Wrestlers and bodyguards also wear an abdominal guard underneath, to protect and support their genitals.

The kaupinam is a very ancient form of sportswear and was in use since the early Vedic Period (2000–1500 BC), as is evident from a verse in the Sam Veda of Hindu scriptures. The devotees of the Hindu god Shiva were said to be wearing kaupinam.

== Religious significance ==
Kaupina Panchakam

Kaupina vantah kalu bagya vantah
Vedanta Vakyeshu sada ramayantah
Bikshanna matrena tustimantah
vishokamantah karane charantah
kaupina vantah kalu bagyavantah

— Adi Shankara

It has religious significance attached to asceticism for the Hindus. The Bhagavata Purana enjoins that a true ascetic should not wear anything other than a kaupina. Sometimes the god Shiva himself is depicted wearing Kaupina. The deities Murugan of Palani and Hanuman are said to be wearing this garment. Langot or kaupin is associated with celibacy. Adi Shankara composed a verse called Kaupina Panchakam to assert the significance of asceticism. Famous Maharashtrian sant Samarth Ramdas and Tamil rishi Ramana Maharshi were always depicted wearing a langot in popular pictures.

== Langota ==
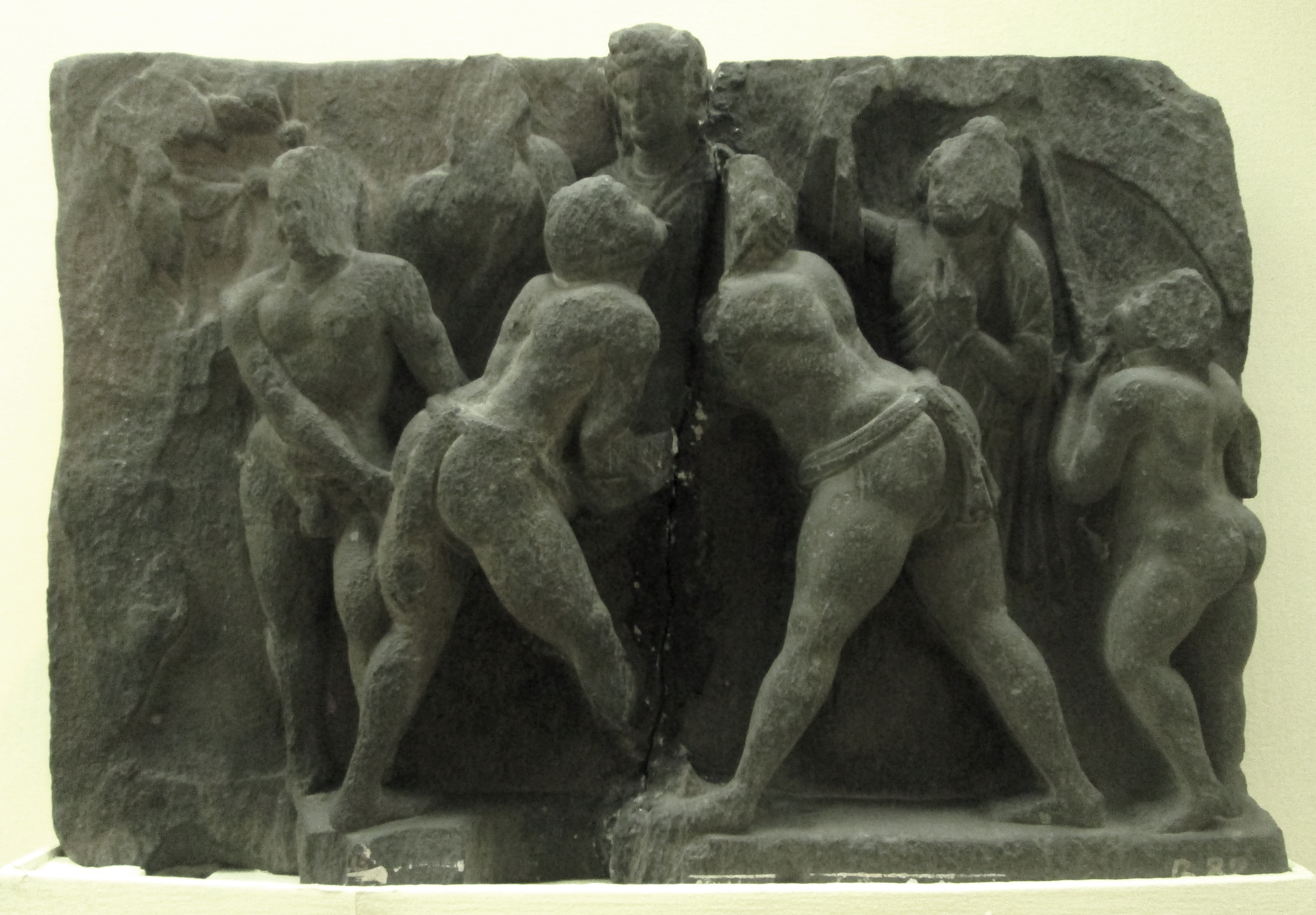
Sculpture of athletes in a similar undergarment at the Indian Museum, Calcutta, recovered from the Graeco-Buddhist site of Jamalgarhi in NWFP, present-day Pakistan.

The older Kapinaum form is distinct from the present-day Langota or Langoti which is sewn and covers the buttocks. It was worn as underwear in dangal held at akharas. It is now mainly used by men when exercising and other intense physical games especially wrestling, to prevent hernias and hydrocele.

The loincloth is about 3" wide and 24" long single piece of cotton cloth. It is first put between the legs and then wrapped around the waist very tightly.

== In media ==
A langot was worn by Mowgli, the main hero of The Jungle Book franchise including the 1942, 1967–1971, 1967, 1994, 2003, 2016, and 2018 films.

== See also ==
- Similar Indian clothes
  - Kacchera
- Related Indian clothes
  - Clothing in India
  - Dhoti
  - Lungi
  - Veshti
- Similar foreign clothes
  - Bahag
  - Breechcloth
  - Fundoshi
  - Loincloth
  - Mawashi
  - Perizoma
  - Subligaculum
  - Thong
- Related foreign clothes
  - Tallit katan
  - Temple garment: religious undergarments worn by many Mormons
