= Veshti =

Cloth wrap for the lower body

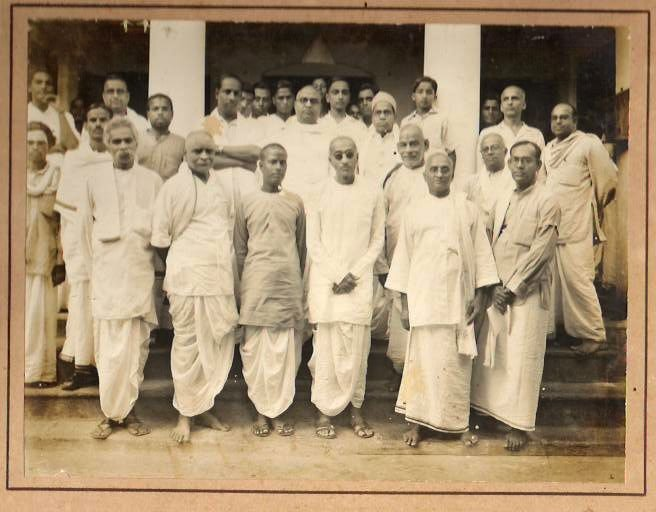
Tamils wearing veshti in 1930s

A veshti or vēṭṭi is a rectangular piece of non-stitched cloth, with varying lengths, used as a wrap for the lower body by the Tamils. It is often white, bordered in brightly coloured stripes. It is generally wrapped around the legs, knotted and secured by a corner being tucked beneath the wrapped cloth at the waist. The style of draping might vary between communities, and men sometimes wear a hip belt to hold the veshti in place. Predominantly worn by men, it is sometimes worn by women and the drape is known as vetti-mundu.

Dhoti is a costume similar to veshti, which is a long, white rectangular piece of non-stitched cloth, that is wrapped around the waist, looped around the legs (similar to trousers) and knotted at the waist. A lungi is also similar to a veshti but made tubular with the ends stitched together, designed with colourful batik patterns, and is a common form of male attire in the countryside.
