= Mawashi =

Loincloth worn by sumo wrestlers

In sumo, a mawashi (廻し) is the loincloth that rikishi (sumo wrestlers) wear during training or in competition. Upper ranked professional wrestlers wear a keshō-mawashi as part of the ring entry ceremony or dohyō-iri.

== Mawashi ==
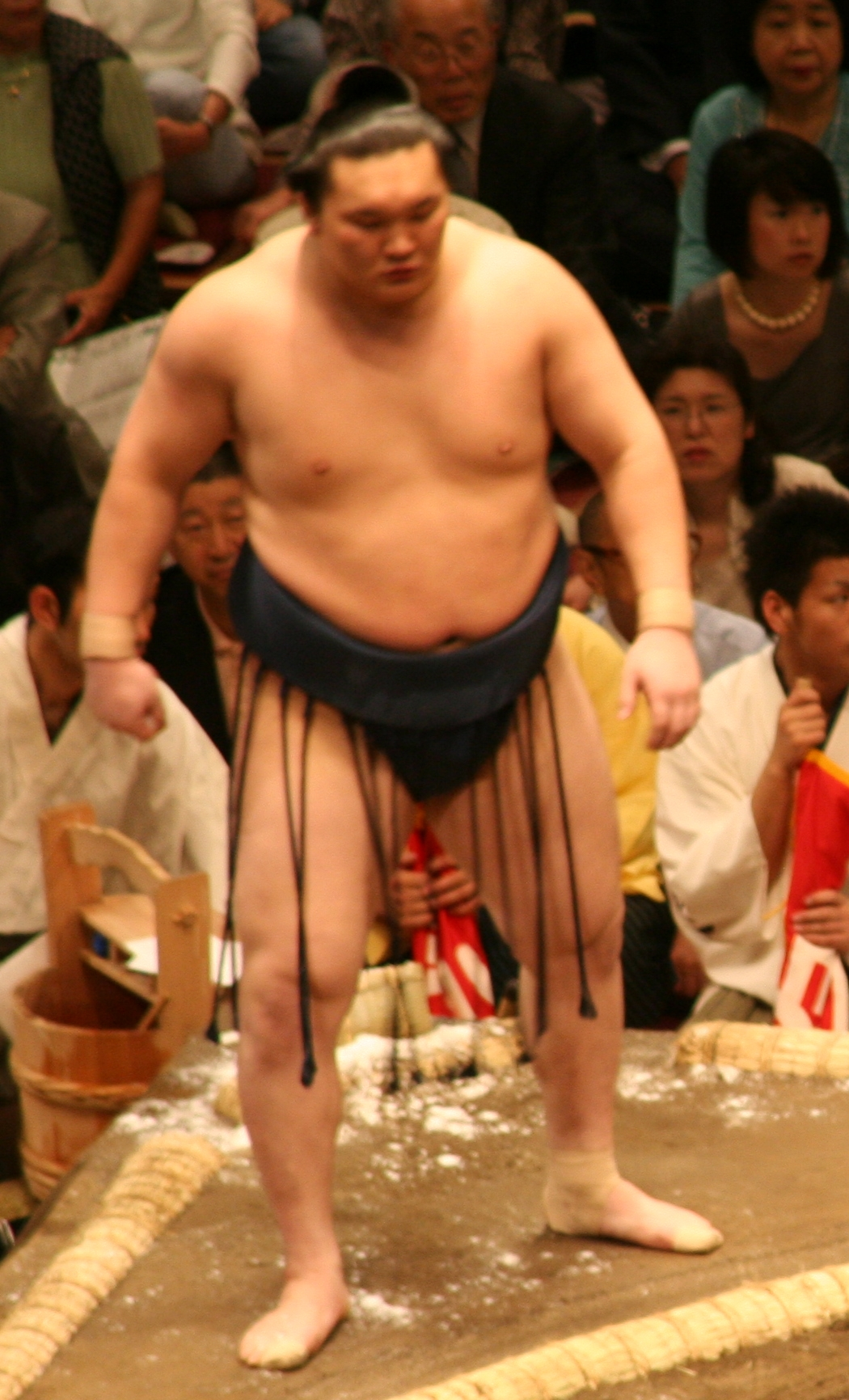
Hakuhō Shō in a silk mawashi, worn by sekitori during tournaments. Colour matching sagari strings hang from the mawashi across his legs.

=== Sekitori ===
==== During competition ====
For top ranked professional rikishi (known as sekitori), the mawashi is made of silk and comes in a variety of colours. It is approximately 30 feet (9 m) in length when unwrapped, about 2 ft (0.6 m) wide and weighs about 8 to 11 lb (4 to 5 kg). It is wrapped several times around the rikishi and fastened in the back by a large knot. A series of stiffened silk fronds of matching colour called sagari (下がり) are inserted into the front of the mawashi. Their number varies from 13 to 25, and is always an odd number. They mark out the only part of the mawashi that it is illegal to grab on to: the vertical part covering the sumotori's groin, and if the sagari fall out during competition the gyōji (referee) throws them from the ring at the first opportunity.

Many rikishi are superstitious and change the color of their mawashi to change their luck. Sometimes a poor performance causes them to change colors for the next tournament, or even during a tournament, to improve their luck. Ōnoshō did this during the 2020 July tournament, when, after several losses in a row, he changed from crimson to dark gray.

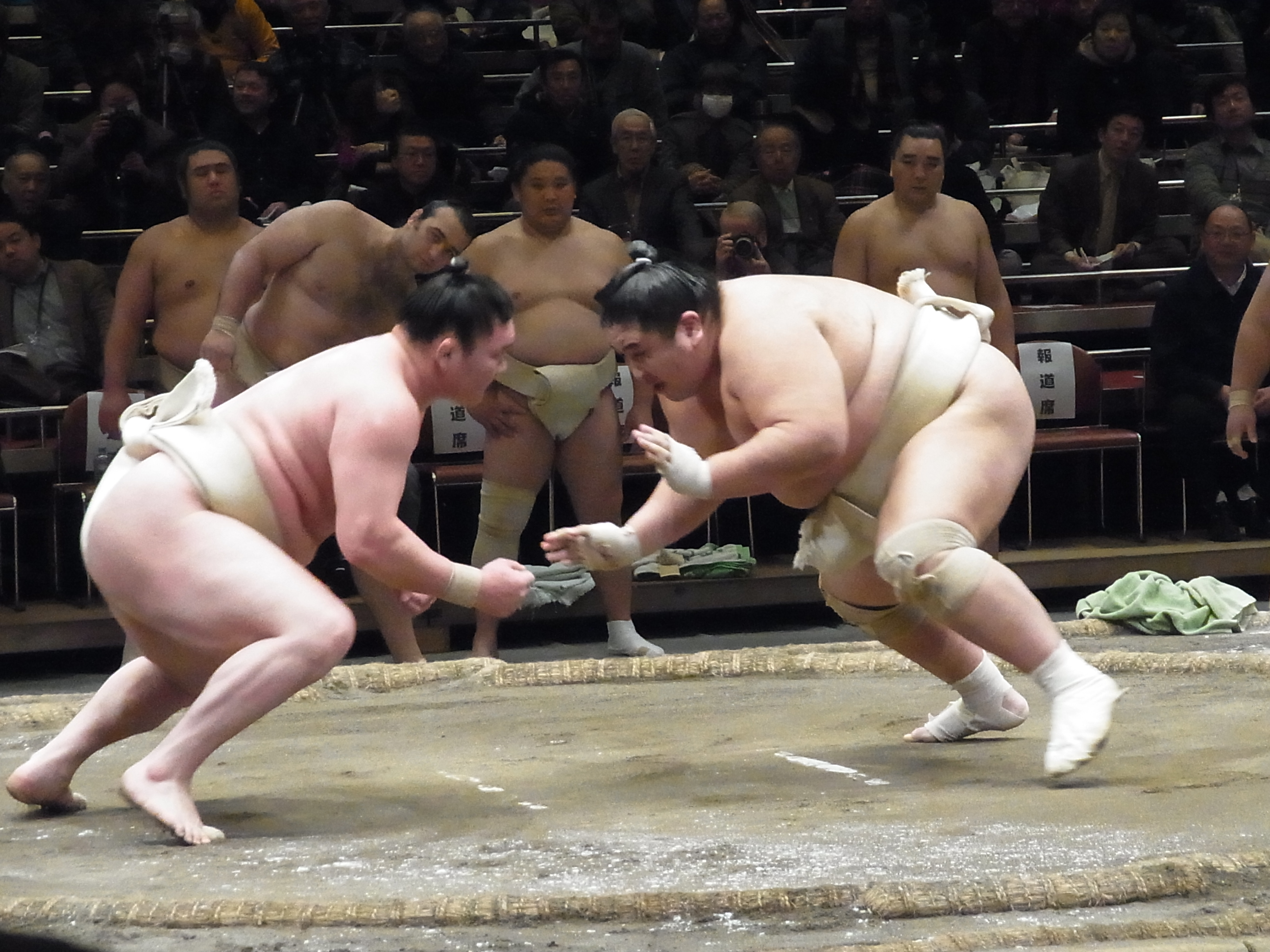
Sekitori in white cotton training mawashi.

==== During training ====
Sekitori only wear the silk mawashi during competitive bouts either during ranking tournaments or touring displays. During training, wrestlers wear a heavy white cotton mawashi. Senior sekitori in the top two divisions wear a white mashi with one end distinctively looped at the front. Wrestlers do not wear a Sagari during training.

=== Lower-division rikishi ===
Rikishi ranked in the lower professional divisions wear a black cotton mawashi both for training and in competition. In competition, cotton sagari are inserted into the belt, but these are not stiffened.

=== Amateur sumo ===
Amateur sumo wrestlers wear a cotton mawashi of any color without the looping accorded to the senior professional's training garb. Additionally, they may wear a tag on the front of their mawashi that identifies them individually or the nation they are competing for, depending on the competition. Amateur sumo wrestlers are also allowed (or required, in the case of women wrestlers) to wear shorts or leotards under their mawashi while professional rikishi are not.

=== Techniques and rules ===
Sometimes a rikishi may wear his mawashi in such a way as to give him some advantage over his opponent. He may wear it loosely to make it more difficult for an opponent to throw him, or may wrap it tightly and splash a little water on it to help prevent his opponent from getting a good grip on it. His choice depends on the techniques he employs in his bouts. Thus a wrestler who prefers belt sumo usually wears it more loosely, while one who prefers pushing techniques tend to wear the mawashi more tightly.

If a wrestler's mawashi comes off during a tournament bout, he is automatically disqualified. This is extremely rare, but did occur in May 2000, when sandanme wrestler Asanokiri's mawashi came off during a match with Chiyohakuhō. However, for most of sumo's history, whether or not a wrestler's mawashi came off during a bout was considered irrelevant, and the policy of disqualification only came into place when Japan began adopting European attitudes towards nudity.

== Keshō-mawashi ==
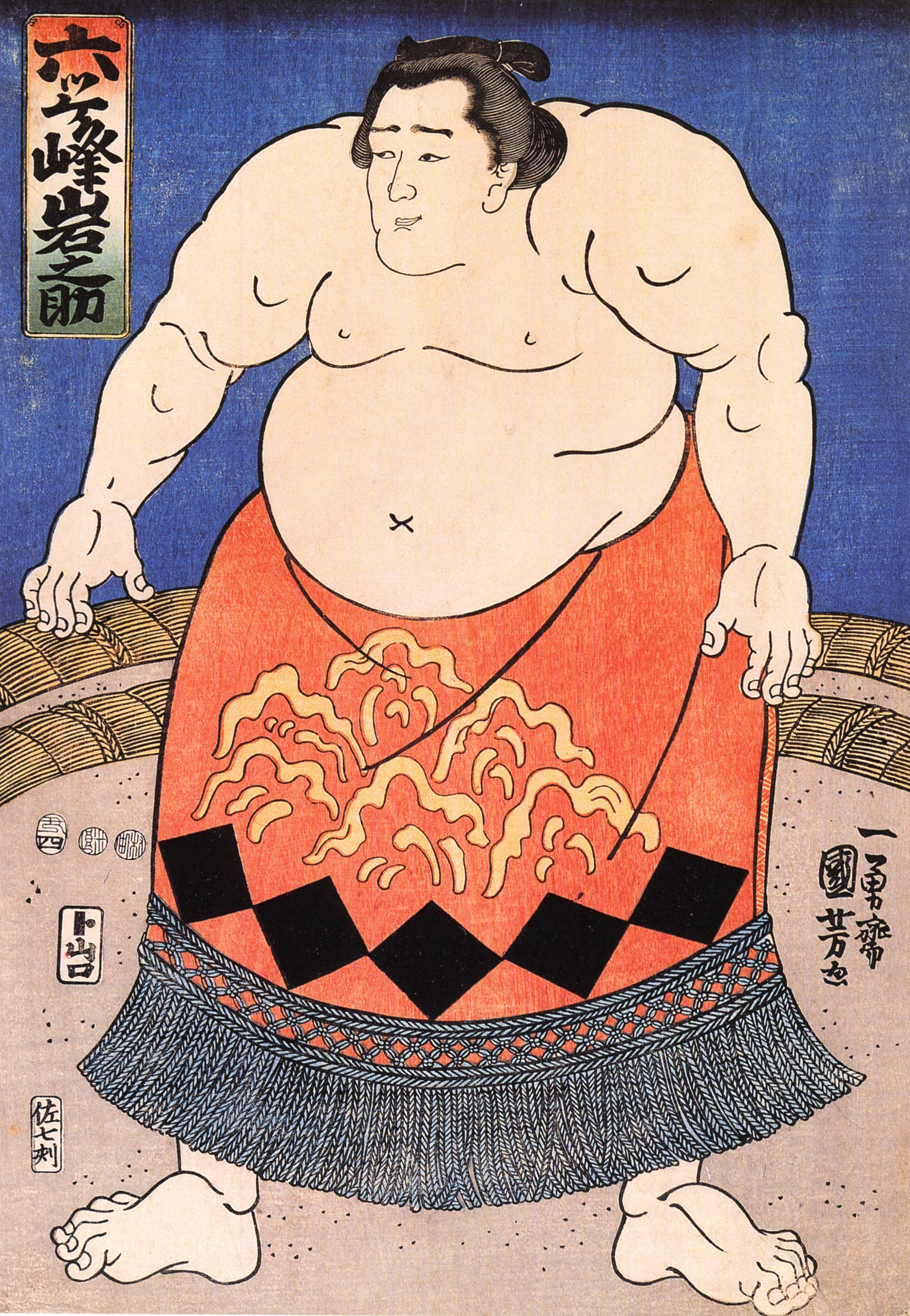
Edo Period wrestler in keshō-mawashi

Wrestlers in the two upper divisions, makuuchi and jūryō, are allowed to wear a second ceremonial keshō-mawashi during their ring entering ceremony. The silk 'belt' opens out at one end into a large apron, which is usually heavily embroidered and with thick tassels at the bottom. The fringe and tassels of the keshō-mawashi are usually gold but may be any color except purple, which is reserved for use by yokozuna and ōzeki only.

The keshō-mawashi may advertise the produce of a sponsor of the rikishi (for example Bulgarian ōzeki Kotoōshū was sponsored by a Japanese brand of yogurt, Bulgaria, which was prominently displayed on the front of his keshō-mawashi) or be a gift from one of the rikishi's support groups. Alternatively, some foreign-born rikishi (such as Czech-born Takanoyama) bear their national flag on their keshō-mawashi. Popular rikishi may be given many of these keshō-mawashi.

Yokozuna have matching sets of three keshō-mawashi, with two being worn by his wrestler "assistants" (his tachimochi and tsuyuharai) during his ring entrance ceremony.

In the Edo period, the keshō-mawashi also served as the wrestler's fighting mawashi. However, as the aprons become more ornate, eventually the two functions were split apart. In this period wrestlers were normally sponsored by feudal daimyō or overlords, whose clan crest would therefore appear on the keshō-mawashi.

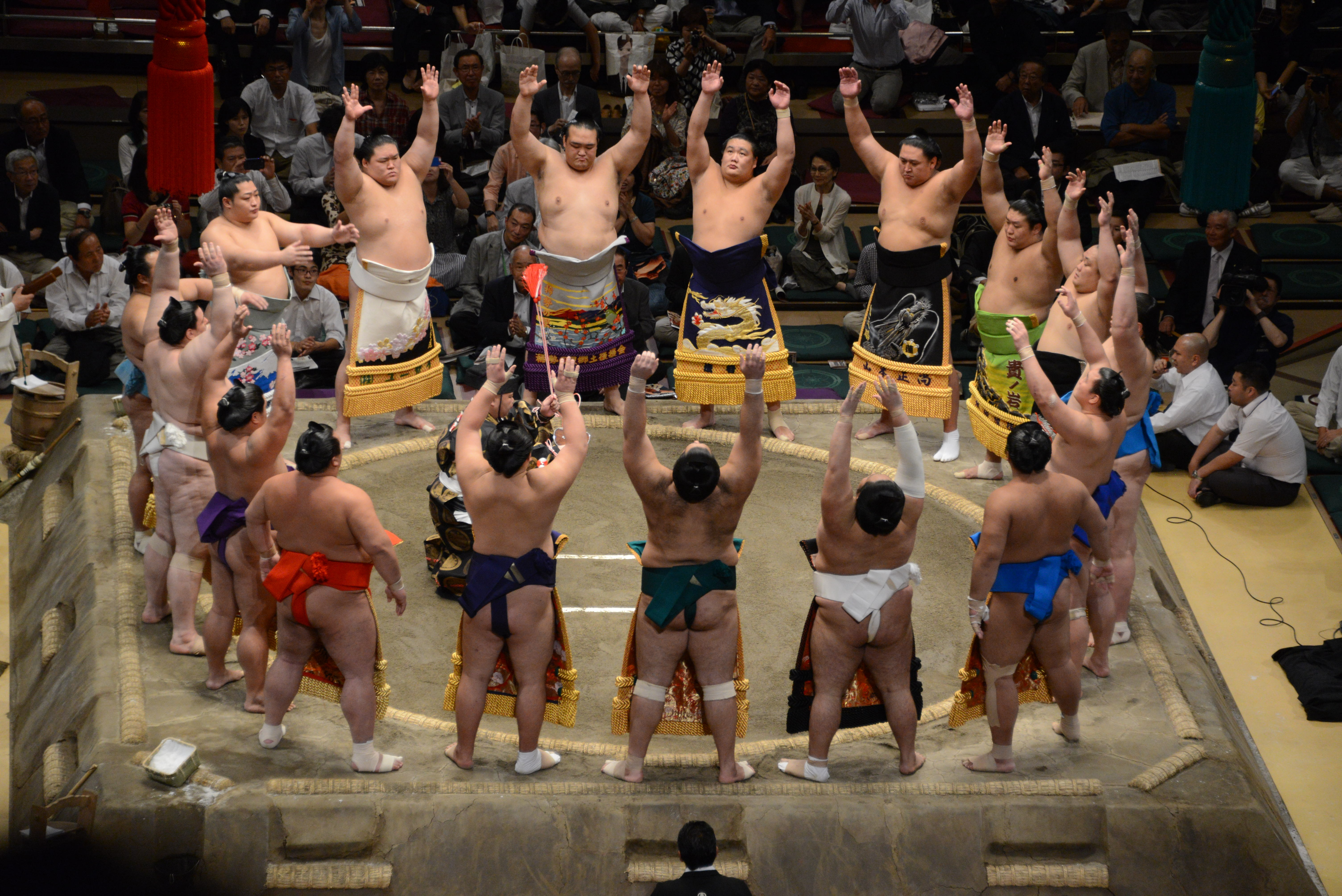
Modern sumo wrestlers in top division ring entrance ceremony, wearing keshō-mawashi

== See also ==
- Fundoshi
- Glossary of sumo terms
- Kaupinam
