= Lungi =

Men's skirt from the Indian subcontinent

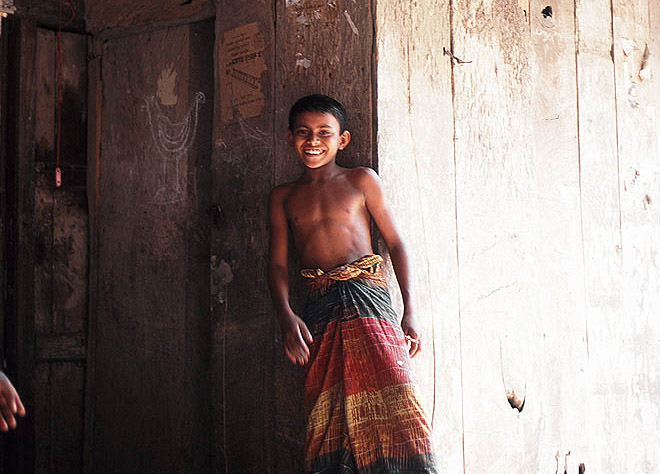
A boy in a village of Narail, Bangladesh wearing a lungi with simple twist knot

The lungi is a men's skirt usually tied around the lower waist below the navel that originated in the Indian subcontinent. It can be worn as casual wear and night wear. The lungi, which usually multicoloured, is favoured in hot and humid climates where the airflow it allows makes it more comfortable than alternatives. It is similar to the sarong in Southeast Asia.

== Design ==
They are especially worn in hot regions. There are also cheaper "open" lungis, in identical dimensions but not sewn into a tube shape. The standard adult lungi is 115 centimetres (45 in) in height and 200 cm (79 in) in length, when open. Children's lungis are approximately two-thirds of this size. They are normally woven from cotton and come in a variety of designs and colors. Silk lungis are used for ceremonial purposes such as weddings. The most common styles are solid-colored and plaid, reflecting the relative ease and cost-effectiveness of producing these patterns on a power loom. Blue is particularly popular, since it fades to pleasant tones in contrast to other colors. Regardless of the design or color, lungis are often lined at the top and bottom with a black/white stripe containing reinforced weaving to prevent fraying.

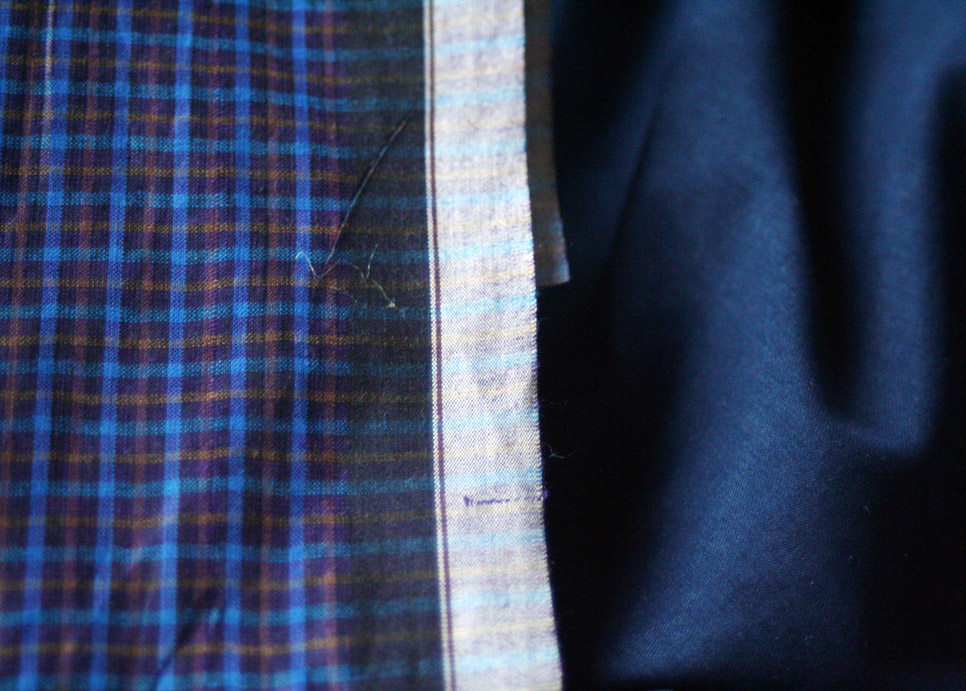
The border of a Bangladeshi lungi, showing the black & white reinforced weave border to minimize fraying

== Usage ==
Depending on local tradition, lungis can be worn by men or, more rarely, women. They are tied or fastened in various ways and can be used in different cultural activities, ranging from normal daily life to elaborate wedding ceremonies. For daily purposes, a simple "double twist" knot is most popular, where two points in the upper edge of lungi are brought together and twisted around twice, with the ends tucked in at the waist. However, it is also common for wearers to simply tie a double "pretzel knot" from 2 points on the upper border, which produces a more secure knot. The lungi's length can also be adjusted, for example, by tucking in the lungi at the waist to make it resemble a short skirt. This is mostly used for labourers who have to work for a long time under a hot sun.

== Regional variations ==
=== Bangladesh ===
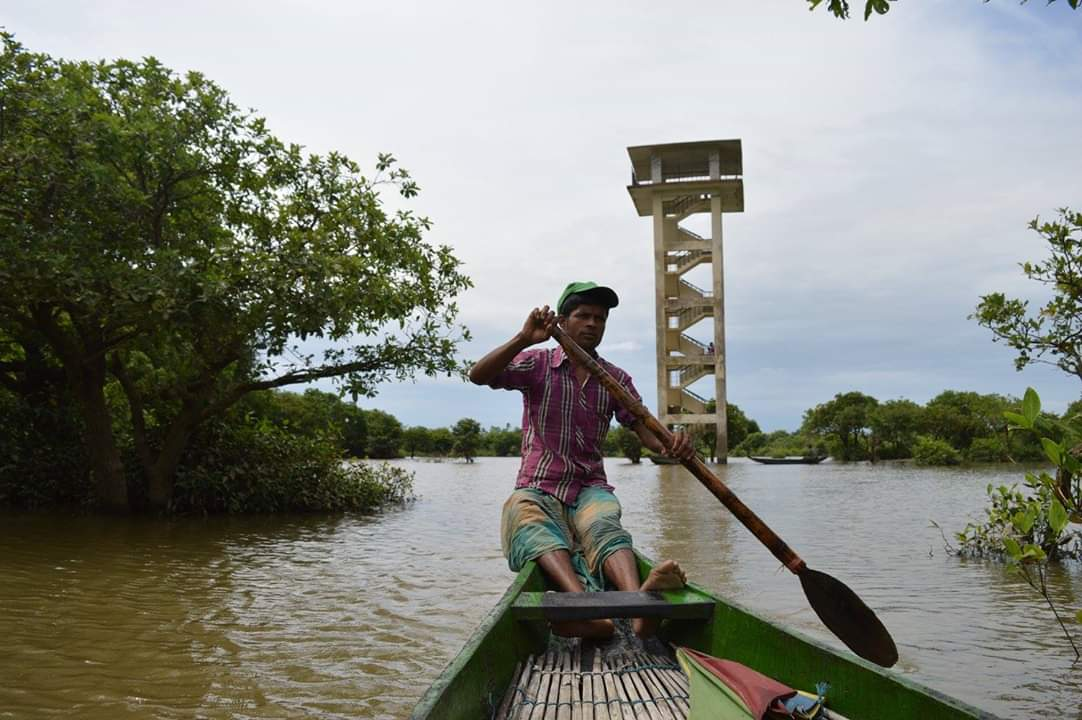
A Boatman in Bangladesh wearing a lungi in Ratargul Swamp Forest, Sylhet

The lungi (Bengali: লুঙ্গি), is the most commonly seen dress of Bangladeshi men, although it is not normally worn for formal occasions. In Bangladesh, lungis are worn by men, almost universally indoors, but commonly outdoors as well. Elaborately designed tartan cotton, batik, or silk lungis are often presented as wedding gifts to the groom in a Bangladeshi wedding. The typical Bangladeshi lungi is a seamless tubular shape, as opposed to the single sheet worn in other parts of South and Southeast Asia. In Bangladesh, the lungi industry is concentrated in Sirajganj, Kushtia, Pabna, and Khulna. Bangladeshi women do not wear lungis, although non-Bengali tribal women do wear similar garments in the Chittagong Hill Tracts. The lungi tradition of Bangladesh can be traced back to Bengal Sultanate when Men used to wear lungis or sarongs of cotton fabrics of various colors along with turbans, dhutis, leather shoes, and belts to wrap their robes on the waist. The word Lungi is a Burmese influenced word in the Bengali vocabulary, came from the word Longyi. Lungi is also believed to be a variation of Dhoti, the word Dhoti came from the Bengali word "Dhowa" which means "Wash".

In April 2013, the Baridhara Housing Society—a housing society in Dhaka—banned the lungi and began refusing entry to those who wore them. Many opposed the ban, however, taking to social media sites such as Facebook and Twitter to criticize the decision. A march took place on 13 April to oppose the ban. U.S Ambassador Dan Mozena has been seen wearing a lungi in front of his house.

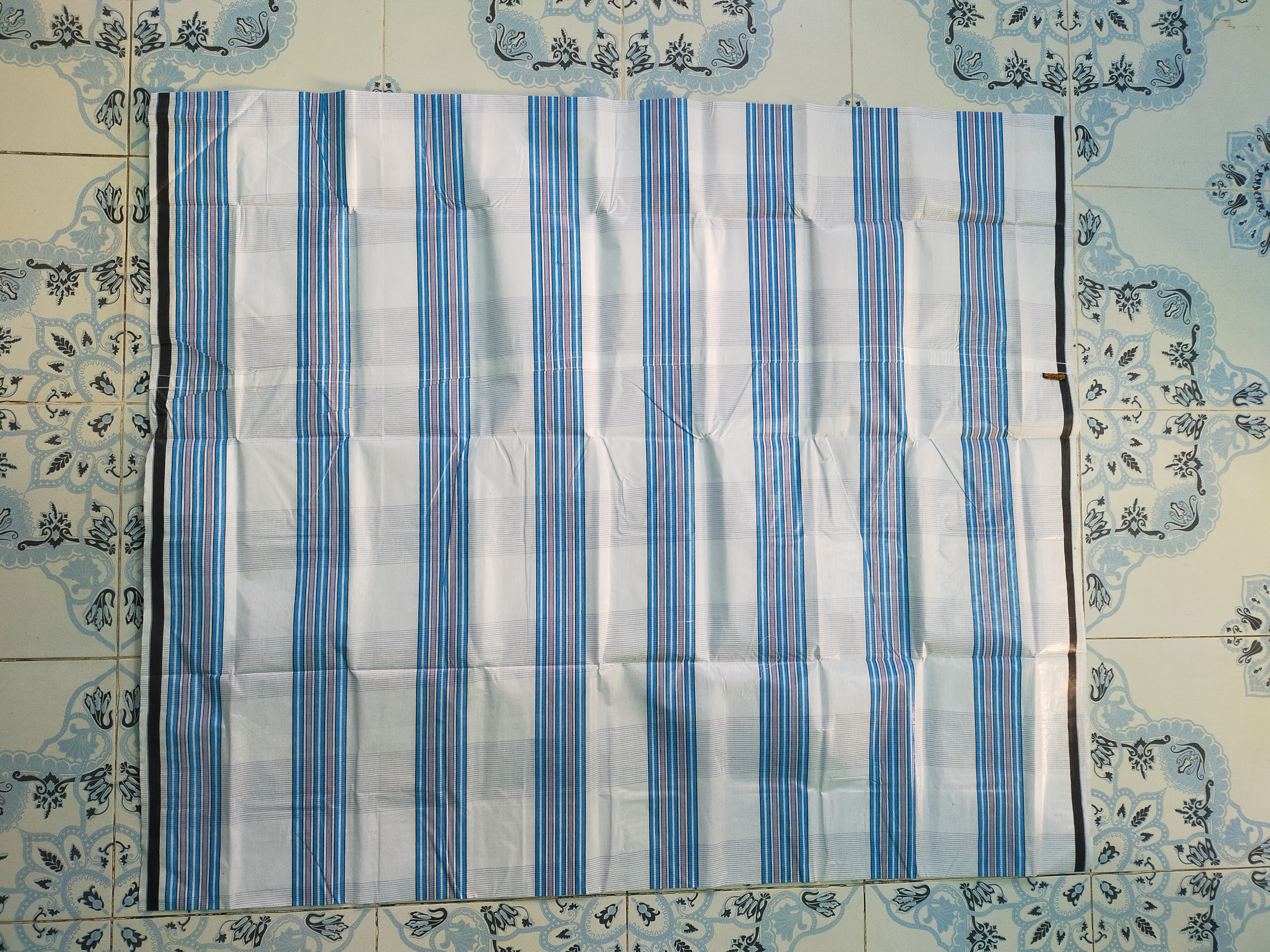
Photo of lungi of Bangladesh. Its conventional measurement is 5 Hath (90") × 2.75 Hath (49.50"). Only one side is shown in the picture.

=== India ===
In India, the customs of wearing lungis vary by state. It can be worn with or without the traditional unsewn kaupinam or modern sewn langot, both of which are types of traditional loincloth undergarments.

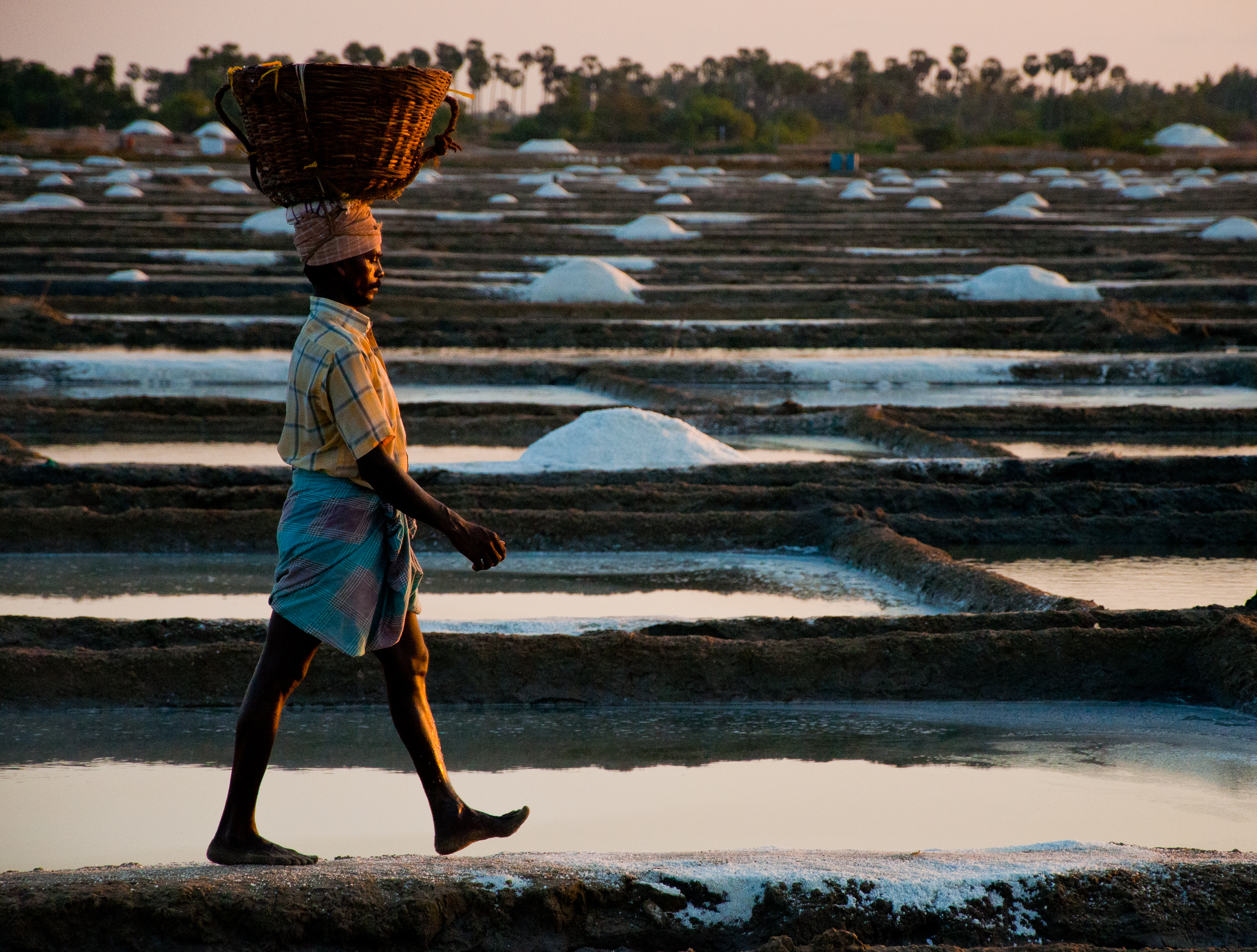
Salt-field worker in Tamil Nadu wearing a lungi in typical tucked-up position for work

In Kerala, the lungi is generally colourful and available in various designs, and is worn by both men and women. It is also called 'kaili (കൈലി)'. Labourers typically wear it while working. A mundu/dhoti is a variation of the lungi and is mostly plain white. It often bears golden embroidery (kasavu), especially at the border. It is worn as formal attire and on ceremonial occasions like weddings, festivals, etc. Saffron-coloured lungis are known as kaavi mundu. Men sometimes tuck up their mundus or lungis with the bottom of the garment being pulled up and tied back on to the waist. In this case, the mundu or lungi only covers the body from the waist to the knees.

In Andhra Pradesh, Telangana, Karnataka, and Tamil Nadu, only men wear this garment. It is also known as kaili or sāram/chāram in South Tamil Nadu.

In Tamil Nadu, the veshti or dhoti is a traditional wear. People wear veshtis for formal occasions whereas lungis are worn as informal or casual wear by some. Lungis with checked pattern are more popular.

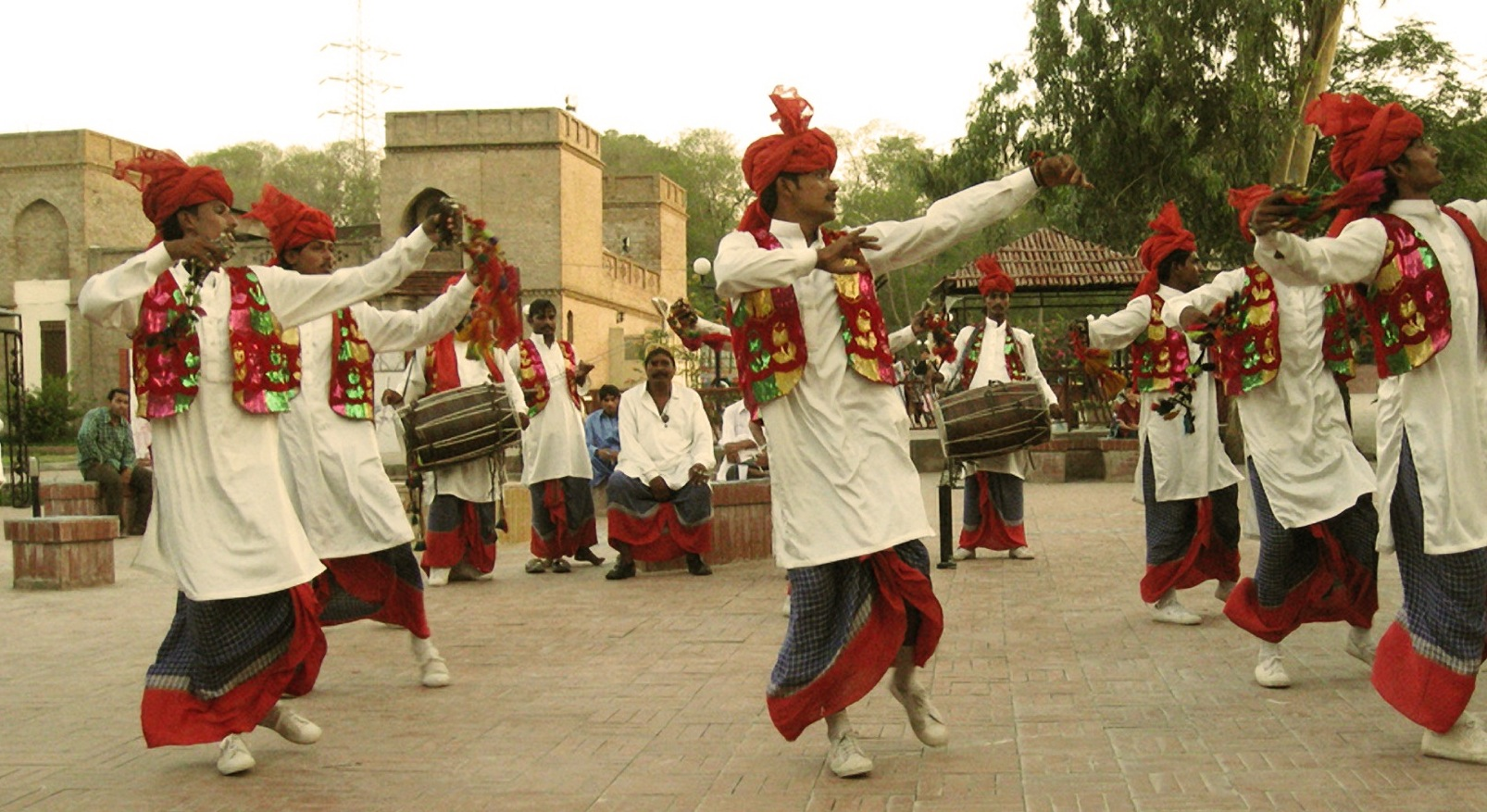
Bhangra dance performers in Punjab wearing Kurta and Tehmat

It is common on the Konkan side of the state of Karnataka, mostly worn by the Nawayath people from Bhatkal. Most of them wear it as their daily attire. It is as a mark of tradition in Bhatkal. They are mostly sewn in a cylindrical shape.

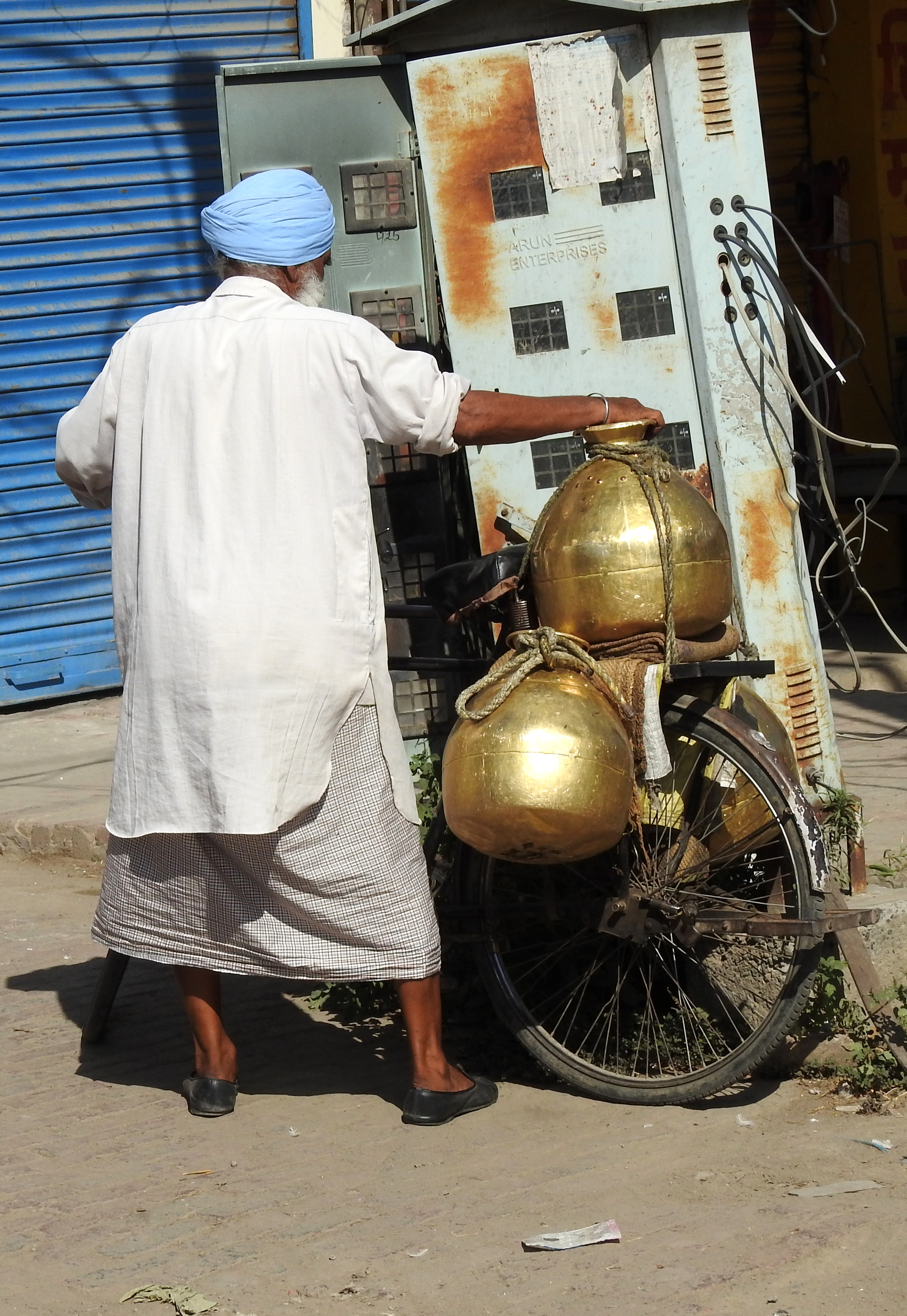
Milk vendor with typical traditional brass containers, Gagar, used in Majha Region of Punjab wearing traditional clothes

In Punjab, lungis are worn by both men and women. The male lungi is also called a tehmat, while the female lungi is called a laacha. They are part of traditional dance attire in Bhangra dance groups, but are also popular in rural areas as home wear. They are generally tied in a different way than in other parts of India and are, as a rule, unstitched and very colourful. Wearing the lungi has declined in the Punjab region in recent years.

In Odisha, West Bengal, Bihar and Haryana, the lungi is primarily worn at home or as a night garment by men. Hindu men generally avoid wearing lungis on the street. In Odisha, Sambalpuri with the Sambalpuri pattern and mule based lungis from Khordha are available in addition to normal cotton fabric lungis.

In Jharkhand, Chhattisgarh, and Madhya Pradesh the lungi is often worn by tribal people. Previously, they used to wear a small cloth around their waist.

=== Maldives ===
In Maldives, it is known as mundu. In modern times, it is worn by elderly men exclusively.

=== Myanmar ===
In Myanmar, it is spelled longyi. For men, the longyi is known as a paso (Burmese: ပုဆိုး), and for women, it is known as a htamein (Burmese: ထဘီ). Longyis of different fabrics, including cotton and silk, are worn for both informal and formal occasions.

=== Thailand ===
In Thailand, it is known as a pa kao mah (Thai: ผ้าขาวม้า) for men and a pa toong (Thai: ผ้าถุง) for women.

=== Afghanistan ===
In Afghanistan it is mainly used by men in public Hammams (steam bath) the word is shorten to Lung (Persian: لنگ حمام). There is only one colour, cream and occasionally red. In Iran it is known as (Farsi: لنگ یزدی)

== See also ==
- Dhoti
- Izaar
- Sarong
