= Kachera =

Sikh religious undergarment

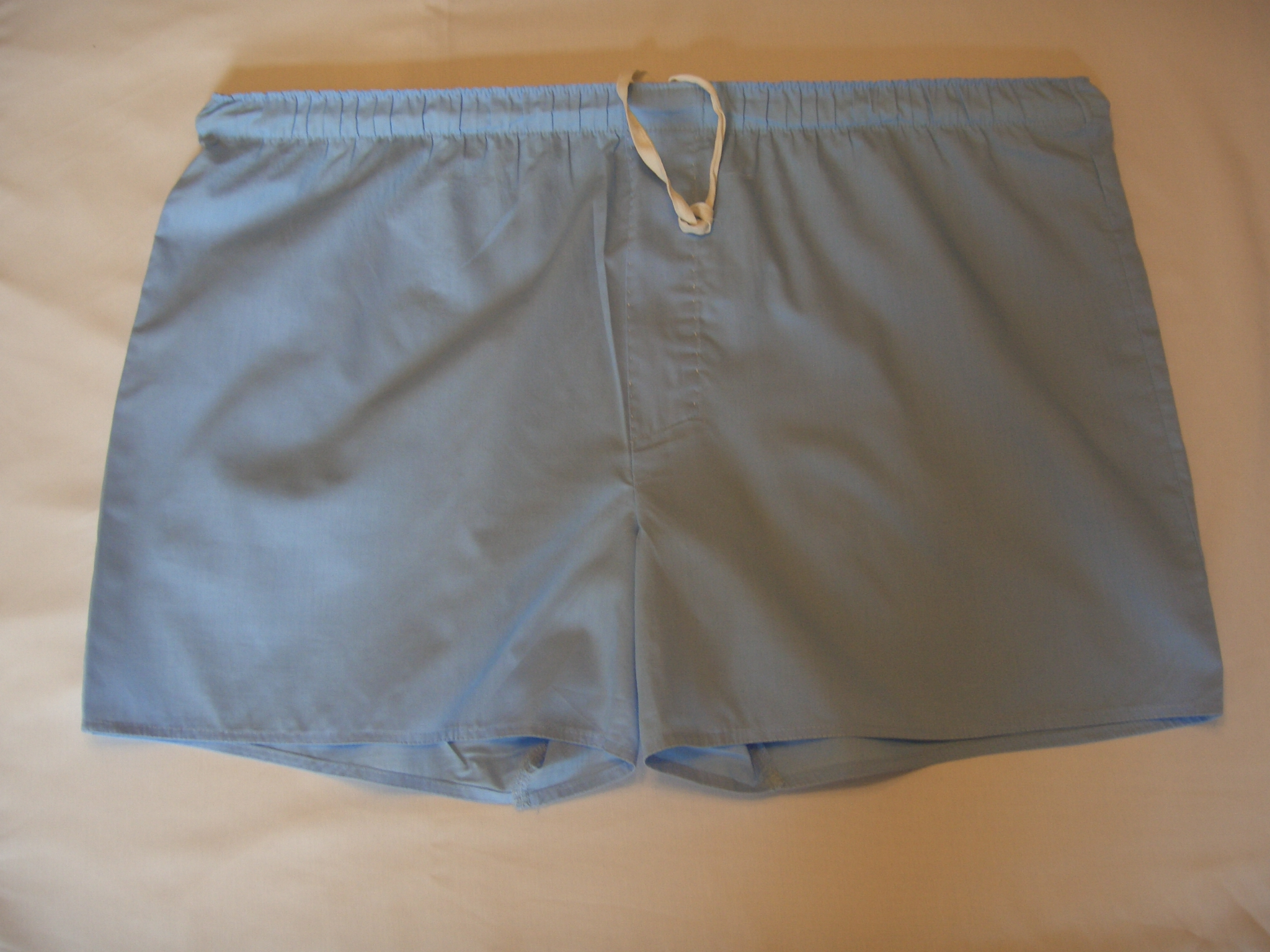
Kacchera

Kacchera or Kachera (Punjabi: ਕਛਹਿਰਾ) is an undergarment for the lower body that is specially tailored for shalwar with a tie-knot naala or naada drawstring worn by Amritdhari Sikhs. They are similar to Western boxer shorts in appearance. It is one of the five Sikh articles of faith called the Five Ks or "panj kakkars"(ਪਂਜ ਕ੍ਕਾਰ), and was given from Guru Gobind Singh at the Baisakhi Amrit Sanchaar in 1699. The Kachera has been worn by initiated Sikhs (Khalsa) since the Amrit sanchaar of 1699, where Guru Gobind Singh, the tenth Guru of Sikhism, first mandated amritdhari Sikhs to wear the panj kakkar as part of the rehit maryada that they must follow.

Both male and female Sikhs wear similar undergarments. This is one of five articles of faith—collectively called "Kakkars"—that form the external, visible symbols clearly and outwardly displaying one's commitment and dedication to the order (Hukam) of Waheguru or the divine being of the universe

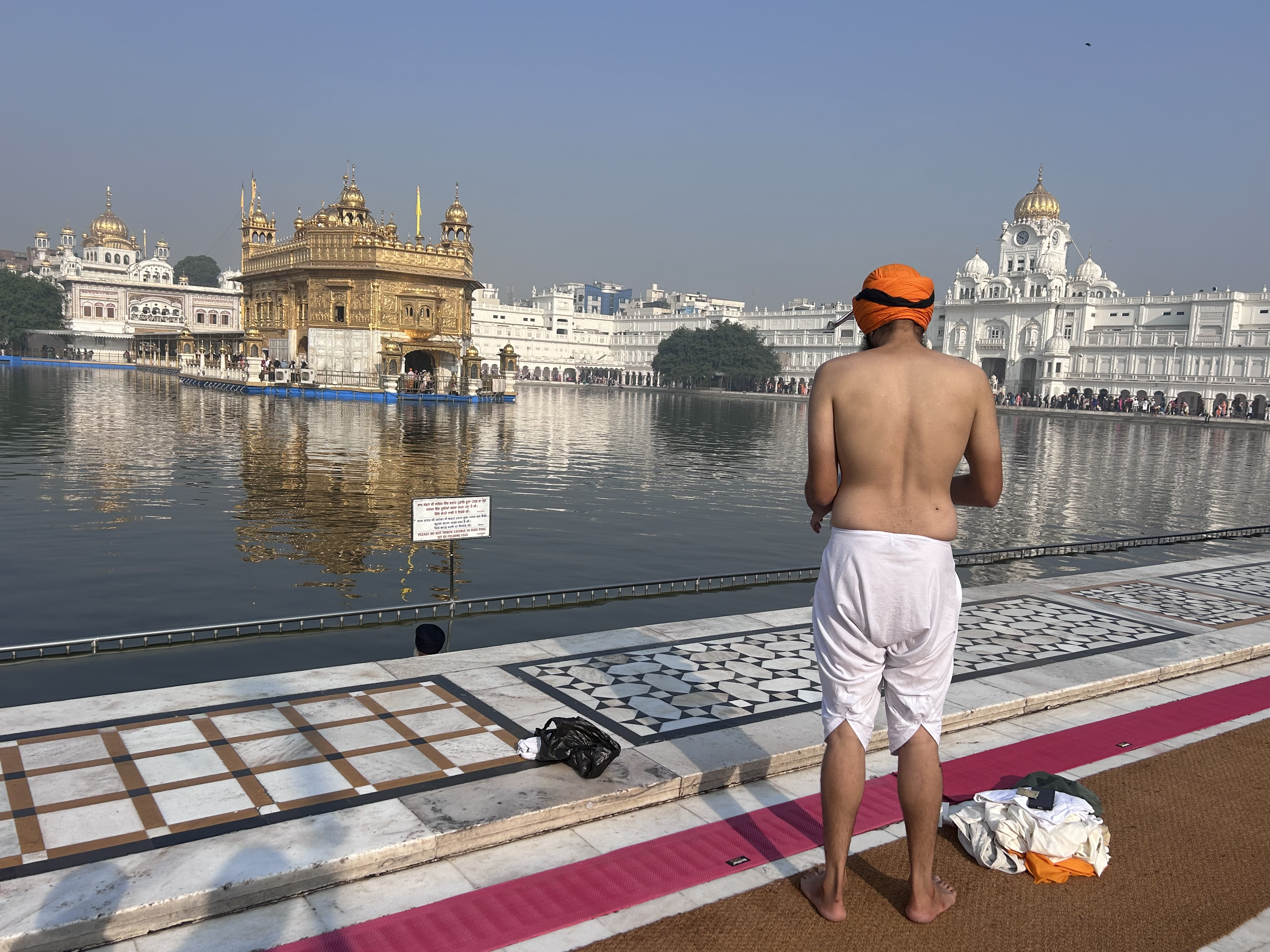
A Sikh wearing Kachera, after taking a bath in a holy water pool (Sarovar) at Golden Temple Amritsar.

The Sikh Code of Conduct states "For a Sikh, there is no restriction or requirement as to dress except that he must wear Kachera and turban." Kachera is a drawer type fastened by a fitted string round the waist, very often worn as an underwear. This Kakkar was given by Gobind Singh to remind his Sikhs that they should control their sexual desire, Kaam (lust). The kachera is above-the-knee underwear meant to give a feeling of dignity, modesty, and honour to the person who wears it. The garment is usually made from white, lightweight-cotton material. It serves to cover the genitalia, as well as to remind the Sikh of the Guru's commandment to think of members of the opposite sex as he or she would think of immediate family and not as objects of lust. The kacchera is secured and tied with a "nara" (drawstring). This serves as another reminder that when one is untying the drawstring one is given time to think about what one is about to do.

The kachera is the Guru's gift and it reminds the Sikhs of the Guru's message regarding the control of the Five Evils, especially lust. It serves its purpose efficiently and effectively and is easy to fabricate, maintain, wash, and carry compared to other conventional undergarments, such as the dhoti, etc.

== History ==
According to Pashaura Singh, Guru Hargobind had his warriors wear the kachera. The Prem Sumarag, dated to between the early eighteenth century to mid-nineteenth century, mandates men to wear kacheera (breeches) and weapons.

== See also ==
- Tallit katan
- Temple garment: religious undergarments worn by many members of the Church of Jesus Christ of Latter-day Saints
