= Chang‑e Rudaki =

"Chang-e Rudaki"

Song by Ruhollah Khaleghi
- Language: fa
- Released: mid-20th century
- Recorded: with vocals by Marzieh and Gholam-Hossein Banan
- Lyricist: Rudaki

"Chang-e Rudaki" (in Persian language: چنگ رودکی; lit. "Rudaki's Lyre") is a Persian vocal-instrumental song composed by Ruhollah Khaleghi in the Bayat-e Esfahan mode, set to a classical qasida by the 10th-century poet Rudaki, beginning with the famous verse "Būy-e ju-ye Mūliyān āyad hamī".

== Background and poetic origin ==
The lyrics are adapted from Rudaki’s qasida "Būy-e Jūy-e Mūliyān āyad hamī" (The fragrance of the Muliyan Creek is coming). According to the Dehkhoda Dictionary, "Mūliyān" refers to a river near Bukhara and a region endowed with gardens by Ismail Samani for his mawāli servants. Traditional accounts suggest that Rudaki composed the poem during a prolonged stay near Herat on a journey with Nasr II. However, modern scholars argue the poem may have originated in Nishapur or Merv.

The song is said to have been commissioned by the Iranian government for Radio Tehran and was one of two songs that "dominated" radio programmes and record sales in the years following the 1953 Iranian coup d'état, which restored the political power of the Shah, Mohammad Reza Pahlavi. According to sociologist Peyman Vahabzadeh, the song "literally celebrates the return of Mohammed Reza Shah to power" using Rudaki's words.

== Musical characteristics ==
The piece opens with a fast-paced overture in 2/4 time, featuring motifs spanning a perfect fourth. Despite its Bayat-e Esfahan foundation, the composition avoids microtones characteristic of that mode, resulting in a tonal atmosphere reminiscent of Dastgāh-e Mahur. The main vocal section is in 3/4 (sometimes perceived as 6/8), with a melody that emphasizes the second and third scale degrees. The female vocalist (Marzieh) initiates the performance with a syncopated entry ahead of the first beat; after the line "zir pāyam pahnīān āyad hamī ", the male singer (Banan) enters on the downbeat. Beginning with the male vocal, the tonal center shifts to Dastgāh-e Shur, and the texture transitions from legato to more detached phrasing. The phrase "shād bāsh va dīr zī " reaches a vocal climax with tonal shades of the Bīdād gusheh in Dastgāh-e Homayun, before returning to Bayat-e Esfahan. Later passages explore Dastgāh-e Dastī and Homayun before returning to the original mode. The piece concludes by restating the introductory overture as a closing passage.

== Performances and reception ==
The song was first broadcast on the Iranian radio program Golha-ye Rangarang, episode 254, featuring Marzieh and Gholam-Hossein Banan. Musicologist Kamyar Salavati describes "Chang-e Rudaki" as "one of the most brilliant pieces in the history of Iranian music".
