= Dhauta Pariksha =

Examination System in the University of Mithila during mediaeval period

Dhaut Pariksha
- Type: Examination
- Administrator: Maharaja of Darbhanga Raj
- Skills tested: Knowledge
- Purpose: To examine knowledge of Scholars in Mithila
- Offered: Pair of Dhoti and Dhaut Samman
- Regions: Mithila region
- Languages: Sanskrit
- Annual number of test takers: The court of Darbhanga Raj
- Also known as Paṇḍitānām Parīkshā.

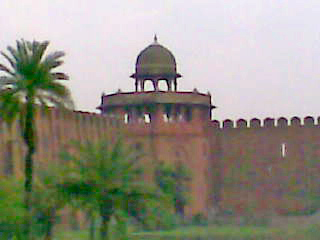
Darbhanga Raj Fort

Dhauta Pariksha or Dhaut Pariksha (Sanskrit: धौत परीक्षा) was the highest examination system established in Mithila during the Darbhanga Raj Kingdom. It was also called Paṇḍitānām Parīkshā.

== Background ==
Mithila was a centre of learning from the ancient period to the medieval period till the 20th century in the Indian subcontinent. To examine the student's knowledge different types of examination systems were evolved in the region. During King Janaka's reign, debates in ancient India (or Shastrarthas) were organised at the court of the kingdom to examine the knowledge of the scholars. Shastrartha was the debate among the participating scholars at the court of King Janaka. The winning scholars were awarded the title Brahmgyani and thousands of cows with gold.

In the later period, Shalaka Pariksha and Shadyantra Pariksha were evolved to examine the knowledge of the students in the region. Similarly, during the periods of Darbhanga Raj, a new system of examination was established by the King Mahesha Thakura at his court to examine the scholarship of the scholars in his kingdom. This new system of examination was called Dhaut Pariksha.

== Description ==
Mahesha Thakura, the founder of the Darbhanga Raj, was himself a jurist, astronomer and philosopher. He introduced a regular examination of Shastrartha, called the Dhaut Pariksha, to prepare the future generation of Pandits. Those who passed this examination were given the highest honor by the Maharaja of Darbhanga Raj, which was called the Dhaut Samman (or Dhautparikshottirna). It was much coveted among the scholars. The Maharaja would give a pair of dhotis to the scholar who passed the examination. The recognition of this examination was such that, no one was considered a superior scholar unless he passed the dhoti. The one who was declared the best in the entire scriptural study, would be given a shawl by the Maharaja of Darbhanga.

The examination was held every year. In the examination, teachers and their disciples were presented. But only the disciples could answer the questions. According to the historian Pankaj Kumar Jha, this examination was generally organised on some auspicious occasions either at the time of accession to the throne or Yajnopavita ceremony at the court of the kingdom. His research found evidence of five occasions the Dhaut Pariksha that was organised at the court of Darbhanga Raj, they were the first by Maharaja Mahesha Thakura, second by Maharaja Maheshwar Thakura, third by Maharaja Lakshmishwar Singh, fourth by Maharajadhiraja Rameshwar Singh and the last by Maharajadhiraja Kameshwar Singh.

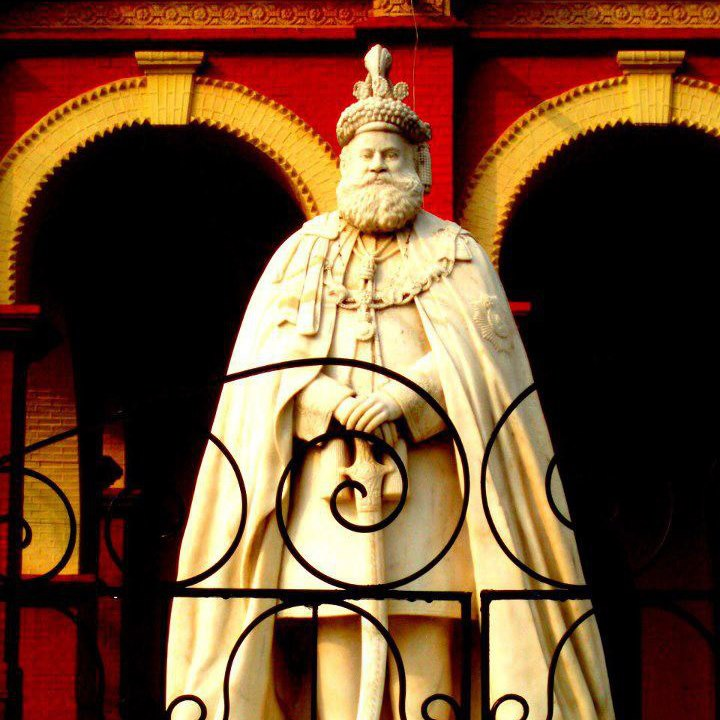
Statue of Maharaja Lakshmeshwar Singh at the premises of the Kameshwar Singh Darbhanga Sanskrit University.

During the period of Maharaja Lakshmeshwar Singh, the Dhauta Pariksha was conducted on the occasion of his coronation at the palace.

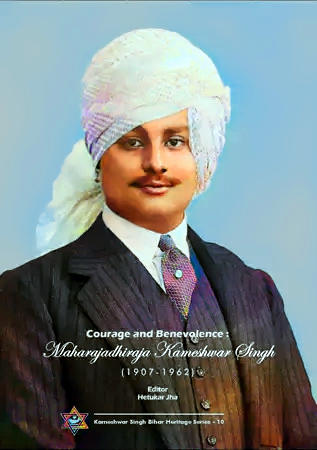
Image of the last Maharaja Kameshwar Singh of the Raj Darbhanga. After him, the examination of the Dhauta Pariksha ended.

The last Maharaja Kameshwar Singh of the Raj Darbhanga organised the Dhauta Pariksha on the occasion of his birthday celebrations.

== Qualification awards ==
In the Dhaut Pariksha, different colours of dhotis were given to the qualifying scholars according to the subjects they passed. For example red dhoti in Nyaya Shastra, white in grammar, yellow in Mimansa, and so on. Similarly, the kings used to name a village based on scriptural debate. It is said that if three or four persons or families from a village or town passed this examination, then they were rewarded with some land and settled in a place and the new place was named after the subject of their scriptural debate and the color of their dhotis by the Maharaja.

== Notable scholars ==
Ganganath Jha was the scholar of Mithila who became Vice-Chancellor of Allahabad University three times. He was also awarded the titles of Sir and Knight. It is said that the pride he felt when he received the pair of dhoti from the hands of the Maharaja of Darbhanga was the greatest honor of any achievement that he received.

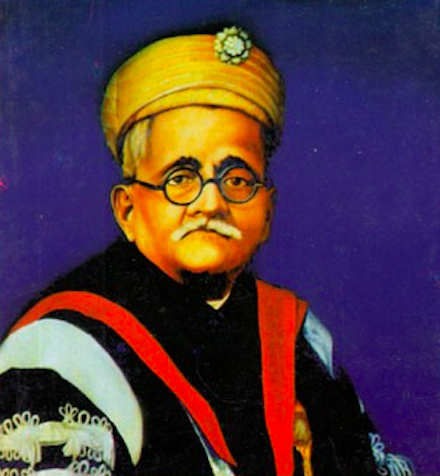
Ganganath Jha

Pandit Lal Das was the author and composer of Janaki Ramayana, Mithila Ramayana and Mithila Mahatmya, etc in Maithili language. He was awarded with "Dhaut Samman" by the Maharaja Rameshwar Singh of Darbhanga Raj.

Image of Maharaja Rameshwar Singh, who awarded the Dhaut Samman to Pandit Lal Das.

Badari Nath Jha (1893-1979) also known as Kavishekhar was the scholar of Sanskrit grammar and literature. He got the first position in the examination of Dhaut Pariksha organised at the court of Darbhanga Raj. He also passed some more examinations organised at other places in India.

== Relation to Panji System in Mithila ==
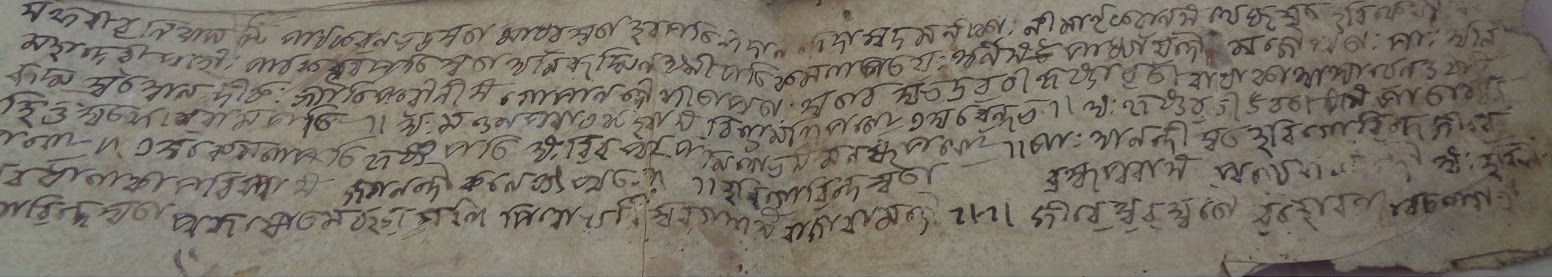
Example of a panji genealogical record kept by Maithili Brahmins and Maithili Kayasthas of the Mithila region

According to the Panjikars Vishwamohan Chandra Mishra and Pramod Mishra', to become a Panjikar (or registrar), there was a 10-year course of study at the Rajashraya of Darbhanga Maharaja. Then the candidate had to appear in the Dhaut Pariksha. After successfully passing the examination of Dhaut Pariksha, the candidate was given the status of a Panjikar (or registrar). It is said that the Panjis system in Mithila survived due to this examination system of the Darbhanga Raj. After the end of Darbhanga Raj, the Dhaut Pariksha also ended and consequently the Panji System in Mithila is also ending gradually.
