= Pandit Lal Das =

Maithili Poet and the scholar of Mithila

Mahakavi Pandit Lal Das Dhout Samman
- Born: Khadaua Village, Madhubani district
- Occupation: Author
- Era: 19th Century CE
- Father: Bachkan Lal Das

Pandit Lal Das was a Maithili poet, writer and composer known by the sobriquet Mahakavi ( means a great poet ) during 19th century CE in the Mithila region of Bihar. He was a scholar of Maithili, Sanskrit, Hindi and Persian languages.

== Early life ==
Pandit Lal Das born at Khadaua village of Madhubani district in the Mithila region of Bihar in 1856 AD. Earlier he was known as Chudamani Lal Das. His father name was Bachkan Lal Das. Pandit Lal Das learn Maithili and Hindi languages at the age of seven only by his teacher Bhaiyadas. Due his father's association with learned scholars, he became fluent in Sanskrit language also. Those days Persian was one of the language of higher education, so his father sent him to a Maulabhi for learning Persian language. In four years of training he became fluent in this language also. There he learnt about Firdausi, Rudki and Khayyam, etc.

== Influence ==
There is a tradition in Mithila that when daughters go to their in-laws' house for the first time after marriage, they are given the text Janaki Ramayana written by the poet Pandit Lal Das, in their Khoincha (lap).

His influence of literature is found in four languages Maithili, Sanskrit, Hindi and Persian. He wrote many poems in these four languages. He was also well versed in Urdu and English. Due to his wisdom he was awarded with the "Dhaut Honour" by Darbhanga Maharaja Rameshwar Singh.

== Works ==
- Mithila Mahatmya
- Janaki Ramayana
- Chandi Charitra
- Tashdid
- Stri Dharma Shikha
- Ganesh Khanda
- Maheshwanar Vinod va Gauri Shambhu Vinod
- Sundavar kaanda Ramayana
- Bal Kaanda
- Haritali Vrata Katha
- Vaidhavyi Bhanjini
- Shriman Mithileshaka Virudavali
