= Gulchehra Baqoeva =

Tajikistani actress

Gulchehra Baqoeva (December 15, 1908 – March 17, 1975) was a Tajikistani actress of the Soviet era.

Born in Khujand, Baqoeva began her career in 1927 by joining the traveling theater of Bukhara; she later joined the roster of the Lahuti State Academy of Dramatic Arts. In 1939 she became a member of the Communist Party of the Soviet Union. She played many varied roles throughout her career, in works by both Tajikistani and foreign writers. Among these was Marina Mniszech in Boris Godunov by Aleksandr Pushkin; Lady Milford in Intrigue and Love by Friedrich Schiller; Jannatkhon in Slander by Saidmurodov and Ismoilov; Qumri in The Red Club Wielders by Sotim Ulughzoda; Tahmina in Rustam and Suhrab by Abdushukur Pirmuhammadzoda; Emilia in Othello; Ogudolova in Without a Dowry by Aleksandr Ostrovsky; Belina in The Imaginary Invalid by Molière; Khovakhola and Muhtola in A Mother's Heart and The Eve of the 28th by Jalol Ikromi; Ganna Likhta in The Prisoners' Plot by Nikolai Virta; Happiness by Saidmurudov and Rabiev; Jahokhola in Arshin Mal Alan by Uzeyir Hajibeyov; Modari Jamila in The Rich Man and the Servant by Hamza Hakimzade Niyazi; Modar in Celebration by Sanad Ghani and two roles by William Shakespeare, Emilia in Othello and Juliet in Romeo and Juliet. The latter was among her most well-regarded performances during her career. She also dubbed films, and played roles on television and radio. For her work Baqoeva was named a People's Artist of the Tajik SSR in 1941. She received the Order of the Red Banner of Labor twice; she also received the Order of the Badge of Honour and the Order of the Presidium of the Supreme Soviet of Tajikistan. She died in Dushanbe.
