= Rashid Vatandoust =

Iranian opera singer and musician

Rashid Vatandoust رشید وطن دوست
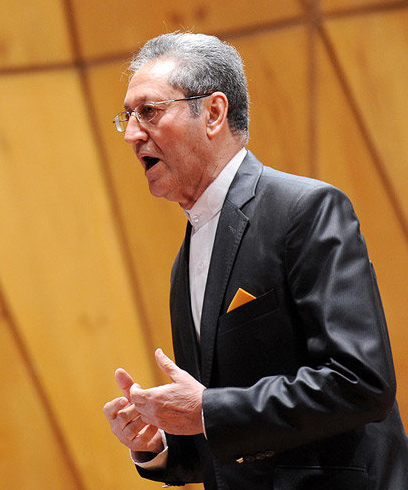
- Performance by Rashid Vatandoust with the choir Tehran Symphony Orchestra,Vahdat Hall Tehran February 20, 2015

Background information
- Born: Rashid Vatandoust; 1946 (age 79–80)
- Origin: Tabriz, Iran
- Genres: contemporary; classical; Persian traditional
- Occupations: Musician, Singer, Music teacher,
- Years active: 1967–present
- Past members: Iran's National Orchestra Tehran Symphony Orchestra

Rashid Vatandoust Persian: رشید وطن دوست (born March 1946 in Tabriz) is an Iranian opera singer.He was born in March 1946 in the Seidler neighborhood of Tabriz to a musical family.

== Early life ==
He began studying music as a child, became interested in opera at the age of 5, and began singing at the age of 7. After receiving his diploma in Tabriz, he went to Tehran and was employed by the Ministry of Culture and Arts. There, on the advice of Manouchehr Biglari, he took an exam and after being accepted into the Rudaki Singing Conservatory and completing a solfege course, he spent three years training his voice and learning classical singing techniques under the supervision of Italian singing master Michele Casato.

== Career ==
Around 1968 and 1969, he was hired by the Tehran Opera, and from 1969 until the revolution of 1978, he performed in about 36 operas and took on numerous roles. He was the soloist of the Tehran Symphony Orchestra conducted by Heshmat Sanjari for about twenty years, the soloist of the National Orchestra of Iran conducted by Farhad Fakhreddini for about ten years, and also the soloist of other orchestras, including the National Radio and Television Orchestra of Iran. In 1988, he was awarded the First Class Artistic Medal by the Supreme Evaluation Council of the Ministry of Culture and Islamic Guidance, and he is currently teaching classical singing. In September 2021, a ceremony was held to honor artists who had a history of artistic activity in the field of sacrifice and sacred defense. In the ceremony, Vatandost was honored alongside artists such as Ezzatollah Mehravaran, Hossein Nouri, and Reza Borji.

== See also ==
- Tehran Symphony Orchestra
- Iran's National Orchestra
- Ruhollah Khaleqi
- Ey Iran
