= Ey Iran =

Iranian patriotic song

- Persian: ای ایران, romanised: Ey Irān
- Unofficial anthem of Iran; Former national anthem of the Interim Government of Iran
- Lyrics: Hossein Gol-e-Golab, 1944
- Music: Ruhollah Khaleghi, 1944
- Adopted: 11 February 1979
- Relinquished: 24 March 1980

Audio sample
- Instrumental rendition in E minor: file; help

Ey Iran
Vocal version c. 1990

Ey Iran
With santur

"Ey Iran" (Note: Persian: ای ایران, romanised: Ey Irân, pronounced [ˌʔej ʔiːˈɾɑːn]; lit. 'O Iran') is an Iranian patriotic song. The music was composed by Ruhollah Khaleghi, and the lyrics were written by Hossein Gol-e-Golab. It was first performed by Gholam-Hossein Banan in 1944.

== History ==
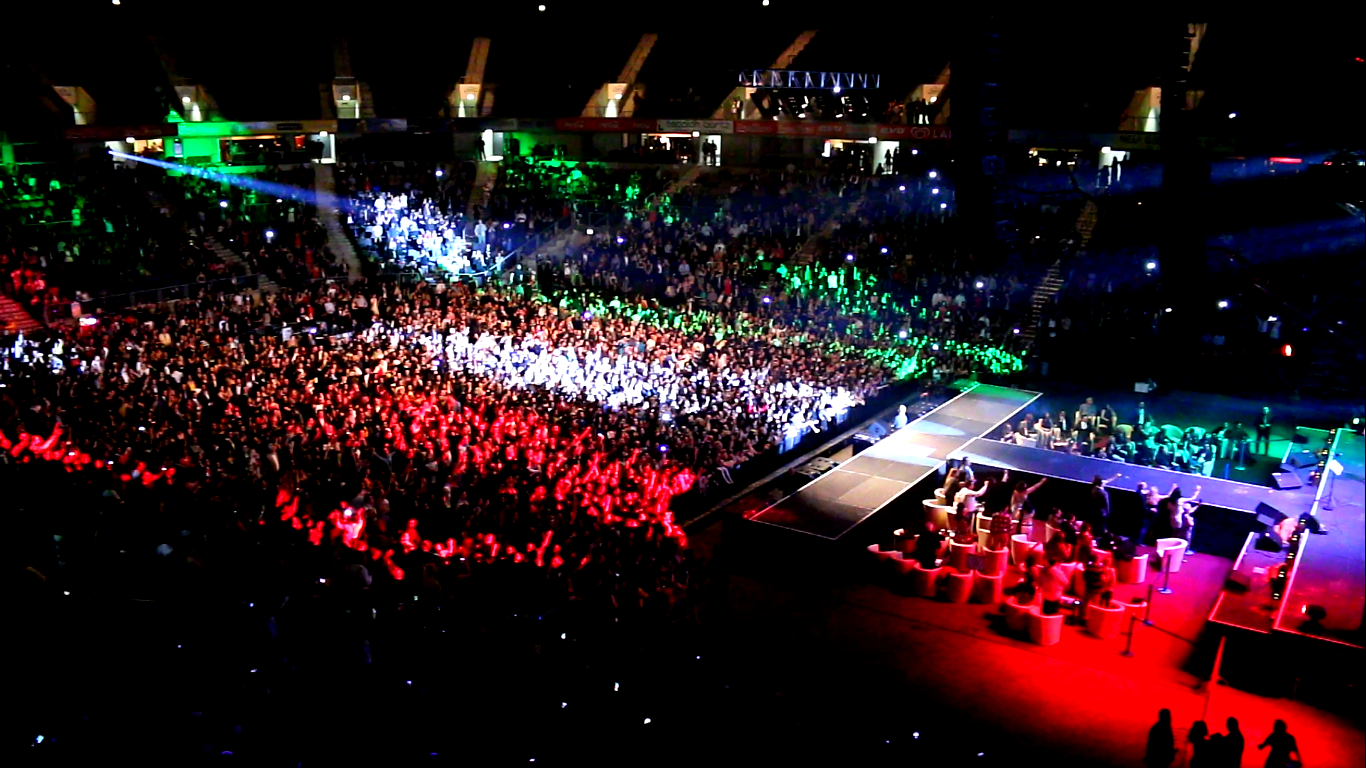
People singing Ey Iran at Oberhausen Arena in March 2014

The anthem was created during World War II. In September 1941, Allied forces occupied Iran following the Anglo-Soviet invasion that overthrew Reza Shah. Hossein Gol-e-Golab was inspired to write a poem on Iranian nationalism when he saw Allied flags waving from an Iranian military barracks in Tehran. That image strengthened his resolve to compose a patriotic piece reflecting Iranian spirit in spite of the occupation.

According to Gol-e-Golab, a confrontation between a British soldier and an Iranian officer further encouraged him to write the poem. Khaleghi later set it to music, and Banan recorded the vocal performance.

Gol-e-Golab later said:

In 1944, the footsteps of the invading armies in the streets were enough to rattle any patriot and inspired me to write this anthem. Professor Ruhollah Khaleghi wrote the music and, despite all the political opposition, it found its way into the heart and soul of the people.

During the transitional period in the immediate aftermath of the 1979 Iranian Revolution, the composition briefly served as the country's de facto national anthem under the interim government.

Since 1979, the song has become widely used in anti-Islamic Republic marches and other demonstrations by the Iranian diaspora abroad and as a symbol of Iran's pre-1979 identity.

== Performances ==
The piece was first performed over two consecutive nights on 27 October 1944 at the military primary school on Istanbul Street, with Banan as the soloist. The audience response was enthusiastic, leading to several encores. Its popularity prompted the Minister of Culture to commission a studio recording, which was subsequently broadcast daily on Radio Tehran.

After the Islamic takeover in 1979, several people involved in its preparation were imprisoned, and public performance of the song was discouraged. Despite this, the melody continued to circulate and served as a morale-boosting symbol during the Iran–Iraq War.

In 1990, Golnoush Khaleghi, daughter of the composer, arranged a new version while in Tehran for the 25th anniversary of her father's death. This recording appeared on the album "May Nab" (Note: Persian: می ناب, romanised: Mey-e Nâb, lit. 'Pure Wine') released by Sorush Publications, featuring a monologue performed by Rashid Vatandoust.

== Lyrics ==
The lyrics of the anthem are presented below in Persian, alongside a romanization, a phonetic transcription, and an English translation.

Perso-Arabic script

،ای ایران، ای مرز پر گهر
.ای خاکت سرچشمه هنر
،دور از تو اندیشه بدان
.پاینده مانی تو جاودان
،ای دشمن، ار تو سنگ خاره‌ای، من آهنم
.جان من فدای خاک پاک میهنم

:برگردان
،مهر تو چون شد پیشه‌ام
.دور از تو نیست اندیشه‌ام
در راه تو، کی ارزشی دارد این جان ما؟ 𝄇
𝄆 .پاینده باد خاک ایران ما

،سنگ کوهت در و گوهر است
.خاک دشتت بهتر از زر است
مهرت از دل کی برون کنم؟
برگو، بی‌مهر تو چون کنم؟
،تا گردش جهان و دور آسمان به پاست
.نور ایزدی همیشه رهنمای ماست

برگردان

،ایران ای خرم بهشت من
.روشن از تو سرنوشت من
،گر آتش بارد به پیکرم
.جز مهرت در دل نپرورم
،از آب و خاک و مهر تو سرشته شد گلم
.مهر اگر برون رود تهی شود دلم

برگردان

Latin script

Ey Irân, ey marz-e por gohar,
Ey xâkat sarčešme-ye honar.
Dur az to andiše-ye badân,
Pâyande mâni to jâvedân.
Ey došman, ar to sang-e xâre-i, man âhanam,
Jân-e man fadâ-ye xâk-e pâk-e mihanam.

Bargardân:
Mehr-e to čon šod piše-am,
Dur az to nist andiše-am.
𝄆 Dar râh-e to key arzeši dârad in jân-e mâ?
Pâyande bâd xâk-e Irân-e mâ. 𝄇

Sang-e kuhat dorr o gowhar ast,
xâk-e daštat behtar az zar ast.
Mehrat az del key borun konam?
Bargu, bi-mehr-e to čun konam?
Tâ gardeš-e jahân o dowr-e âsemân be pâst,
Nur-e izadi hamiše rahnamâ-ye mâst.

Bargardân

Irân, ey xorram behešt-e man,
Rowšan az to sarnevešt-e man.
Gar âtaš bârad be peykaram,
Joz mehrat dar del naparvaram.
Az âb o xâk o mehr-e to serešte šod gelam,
Mehr agar borun ravad tohi shavad delam.

Bargardân

IPA transcription

[ʔej ʔiːˈɾɑːn ʔej ˈmæɾ.ze pʰoɾ‿goˈhæɾ |]
[ʔej ˈχɑː.kʰæt ˌsæɾ.tʃʰeʃˈme.je hoˈnæɾ |]
[duːɾ ʔæz tʰo ˌʔæn.diːˈʃe.je bæˈdɑːn |]
[ˌpʰɑː.jænˈde mɑːˈniː tʰo ˌdʒɑː.ʋeˈdɑːn ǁ]
[ʔej | doʃˈmæn ʔæɾ tʰo ˈsæŋ.ge χɑːˈɾe.ʔiː mæn ʔɑːˈhæ.næm |]
[ˈdʒɑː.ne mæn fæˈdɑː.je ˈχɑː.kʰe ˈpʰɑː.kʰe miːˈhæ.næm ǁ]

[ˌbæɾ.gæɾˈdɑːn]:
[ˈmeɦ.ɾe tʰo tʃʰon | ʃod pʰiːˈʃe.ʔæm ǀ]
[duːɾ‿æz tʰo niːst | ˌʔæn.diːˈʃe.ʔæm ǁ]
𝄆 [dær ˈrɑː.he tʰo | kʰej ˌʔæɾ.zeˈʃiː dɑːˈɾæd ʔiːn ˈdʒɑː.ne mɑː |]
[ˌpʰɑː.jæn.ˈde bɑːd ˈχɑː.kʰe ʔiːˈɾɑː.ne mɑː ǁ] 𝄇

[ˈsæn.ge ˈkʰuː.hæt ˈdorː‿o gou̯ˈhæɾ‿æst |]
[ˈχɑː.kʰe ˈdæʃ.tʰæt beɦˈtʰæɾ‿æz zæɾ‿æst |]
[ˈmeɦ.ɾæt ʔæz del kʰej boˈɾuːn ˈkʰo.næm |]
[bæɾˈguː biːˈmeɦ.ɾe tʰo tʃʰuːn ˈkʰo.næm ǁ]
[tʰɑː | gæɾˈde.ʃe dʒæˈhɑːn‿o ˈdou̯.ɾe ˌʔɑː.seˈmɑːn be‿pʰɑːst |]
[ˈnuː.ɾe ˌʔiː.zæˈdiː ˌhæ.miːˈʃe ˌɾæɦ.næˈmɑː.je mɑːst ǁ]

[ˌbæɾ.gæɾˈdɑːn]

[ʔiːˈɾɑːn ʔej ˈχor.ræm beˈheʃ.tʰe mæn |]
[ɾou̯ˈʃæn ʔæz tʰo ˌsæɾ.neˈʋeʃ.tʰe mæn |]
[gæɾ ʔɑːˈtʰæʃ bɑːˈɾæd be‿pʰejˈkʰæ.ɾæm |]
[dʒoz ˈmeɦ.ɾæt dæɾ del ˌnæ.pʰæɾˈʋæ.ɾæm ǁ]
[ʔæz | ˈʔɑːb‿o ˈχɑːkʰ‿o ˈmeɦ.ɾe tʰo ˌse.ɾeʃˈtʰe ʃod ˈge.læm |]
[meɦɾ‿ˈæ.gæɾ boˈɾuːn ɾæˈʋæd tʰoˈhiː ʃæˈʋæd ˈde.læm ǁ]

[ˌbæɾ.gæɾˈdɑːn]

English translation

O Iran, the land of gems abound,
O the wellspring of arts is your ground.
Far from you may the thoughts of evil be,
Long may you last and eternal be.
O enemy, if you are of rock, I am of iron,
May my life be sacrificed for my homeland's pure soil.

Refrain:
Since your love became my calling,
Never far are my thoughts from you.
𝄆 In your cause, when do our lives have value?
Eternal may the land of Iran be. 𝄇

The stones of your peaks are jewels and pearls,
Greater than gold are your valleys' soils.
When would I ever doff your ardour?
Tell me what I'd do without your fervour?
As long as the earth revolves and the sky cycles,
The light of the Divine will always guide us.

Refrain

Iran, O my gorgeous paradise,
Bright is my destiny because to you.
Even if fire on my body rains,
I'll cherish naught but my love for you.
I am made of your love, your waters and your earth,
If your love leaves my heart, empty it will become.

Refrain

== See also ==
- Imperial Anthem of Iran
- National Anthem of the Islamic Republic of Iran
