= Rudaki =

Persian poet (858–940/41)

- رودکی
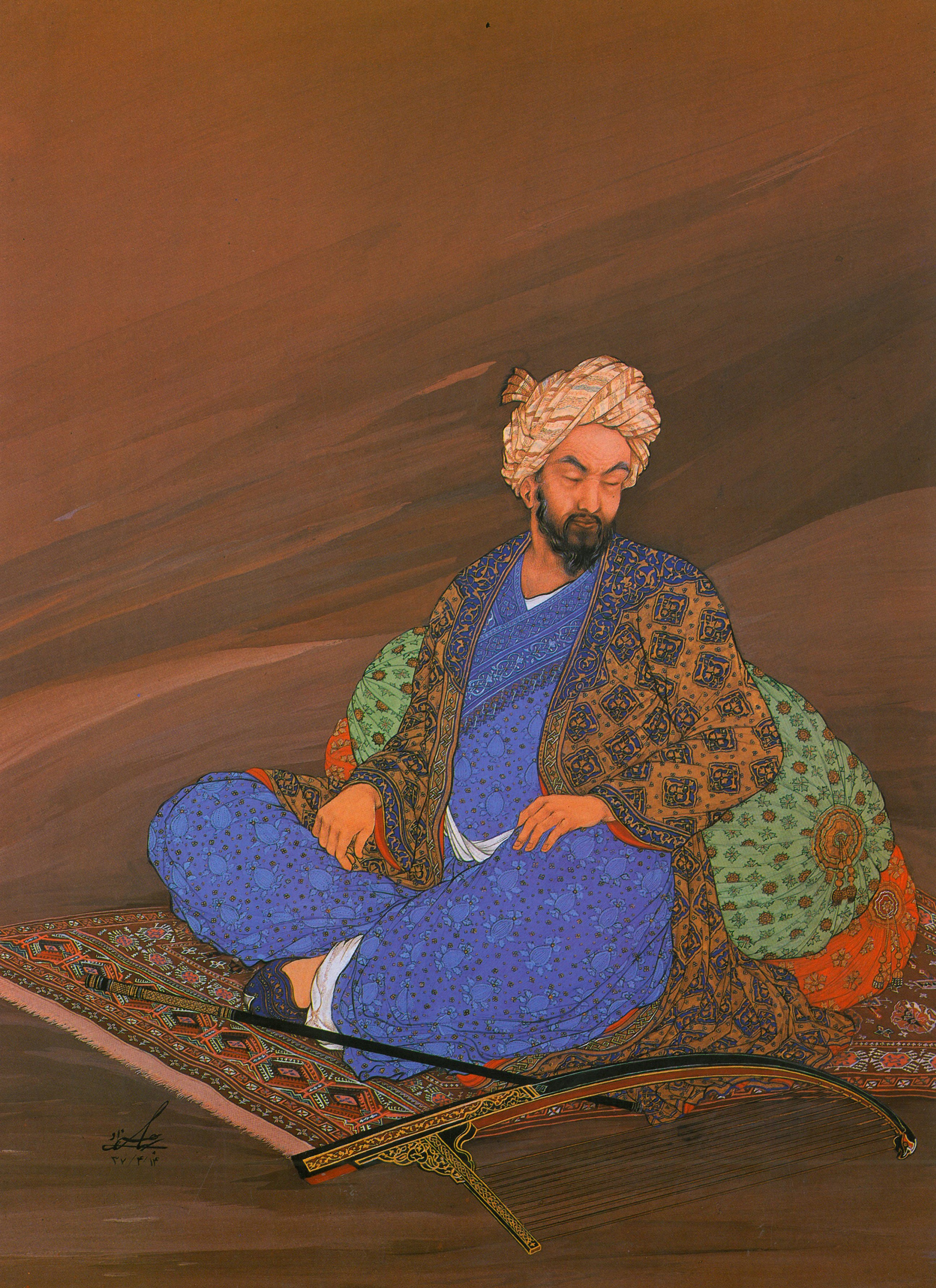
- Illustration of Rudaki by Hossein Behzad, dated 1958
- Born: c. 858; Panjrud, Samanid Empire
- Died: 940/41 (aged 82 or 83); Panjrud, Samanid Empire
- Resting place: Panjrud, Tajikistan
- Occupations: Poet; singer; musician
- Writing career
- Language: New Persian

Rudaki (also spelled Rodaki; Persian: رودکی; c. 858 – 940/41) was a poet, singer, and musician who is regarded as the first major poet to write in New Persian. A court poet under the Samanids, he reportedly composed more than 180,000 verses, yet only a small portion of his work has survived, most notably parts of his versification of the Kalīla wa-Dimna, an Arabic translation of Panchatantra.

Born in the village of Panjrud near Samarqand, the most important part of Rudaki's career was spent at the court of the Samanids, in Bukhara. While biographical information connects him to the Samanid amir (ruler) Nasr II (r. 914–943), he may have already joined the court under the latter's predecessor, Ahmad Samani (r. 907–914).

Rudaki's success was largely due to the support of his primary patron, the vizier Abu'l-Fadl al-Bal'ami (died 940), who played an important role in the blooming of New Persian literature in the 10th-century. Following the downfall of Bal'ami in 937, Rudaki's career deteriorated, eventually being dismissed from the court. He thereafter lived his last years in poverty, dying blind and alone in his hometown.

In Iran, Rudaki is acknowledged as the "founder of New Persian poetry" and in Tajikistan as the "father of Tajik literature".

== Name ==
His full name, according to the 12th-century author Ahmad Sam'ani, was Abu Abd Allah Ja'far ibn Muhammad ibn Hakim ibn Abd al-Rahman ibn Adam al-Rudhaki al-Sha'ir al-Samarqandi (Persian: ابوعبدالله جعفر بن محمد بن حکیم بن عبدالرحمن بن آدم الرودکی الشاعر سمرقندی). The proper transliteration of his name is Rōdhakī, while al-Rūdhakī is an arabicised form. Other transliterations include Rudagi, Rawdhagi and Rudhagi.

== Background ==
Little information is available about Rudaki's life, much which has been reconstructed from his poems. He lived during the era of the Samanid Empire (819–999), under which New Persian literature began to develop and flourish. Rudaki was born c. 858. Ahmad Sam'ani gives his birthplace as Rudak (Rōdhak), a suburb of Samarqand, where he also died. The Tajik writer Sadriddin Ayni identified Rudaki's birthplace as the village of Panjrud (or Panjrudak), in the former Panjakent District of Tajikistan (in the jamoat of Rudaki). Rudaki's blindness is implied by the writings of early poets such as Daqiqi (died 977), Ferdowsi (died 1020/25), Abu Zura'ah al-Mu'ammari (fl. 10th-century) and Nasir Khusraw (died after 1070). The historian Awfi (died 1242), even says that Rudaki was born blind, but this has been questioned by some modern scholars, due to the expressive picture of nature given by Rudaki in his writings.

Besides being a poet, Rudaki was also a singer and musician. Since the era of Sasanian Iran (224–651), poems were commonly carried out as songs used in music. Under the Sasanians, the official, religious and literary language was Middle Persian. Following the Muslim conquest of Iran, the language entered a new phase, known as New Persian. However, it is not descended from the literary form of Middle Persian (known as pārsīk, commonly called Pahlavi), which was spoken by the people of Fars and used in Zoroastrian religious writings. Instead, it is descended from the dialect spoken by the court of the Sasanian capital Ctesiphon and the northeastern Iranian region of Khurasan. During this period, New Persian was known as darī or parsī-i darī.

== Career ==
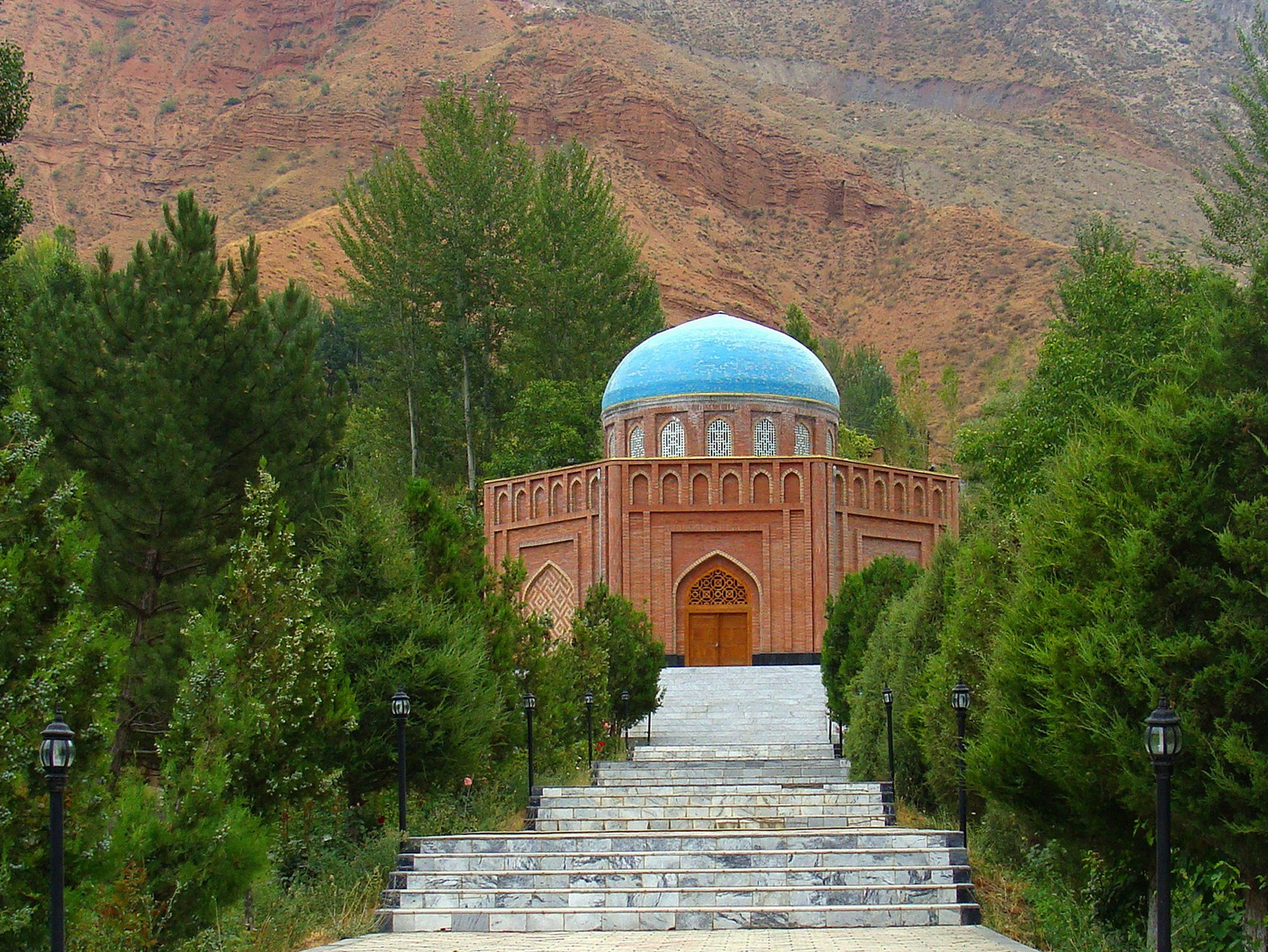
Rudaki's tomb in the village of Panjrud, near Panjakent, Tajikistan

By the age of eight, Rudaki had reportedly memorized the Qur'an and was skilled in poetry. He was instructed on how to play the chang by a prominent musician named Abu'l-Abak Bakhtiar. In his early years, Rudaki became a popular figure due to his fine voice, skill with poetry and playing the chang. Surviving biographical information connects Rudaki with the Samanid amir (ruler) Nasr II (r. 914–943) or with his vizier Abu'l-Fadl al-Bal'ami (died 940). However, according to literary scholar Sassan Tabatabai, Rudaki had apparently already joined the Samanid court under Nasr II's father and predecessor Ahmad Samani (r. 907–914). Tabatabai states that this is proven in a poem by Rudaki, where he tries to comfort Ahmad Samani after the death of his father Ismail Samani in 907.

Rudaki's career at the Samanid court is regarded as the most important part of his life. The role of a court poet was more than just entertaining others, and was an essential aspect of the Persian court. According to the first Sasanian king Ardashir I (r. 224–242), a poet was "part of government and the means of strengthening rulership." Besides applauding the suzerain and his domain, a poet was also expected to give advice and moral guidance, which meant that Rudaki was most likely experienced in that field as well. Rudaki's success was largely due to the support of his primary patron, Bal'ami. The latter played an important role in the blooming of Persian literature in the 10th century. Bal'ami regarded Rudaki as the best amongst Persian and Arab poets.

Rudaki was a close friend to his student Shahid Balkhi, a leading poet and scholar of the Samanid realm. Following Shahid Balkhi's death in 936, Rudaki wrote an elegy for him. Rudaki's career started to decline following the downfall of Bal'ami in 937. He soon fell out of favour with the amir and was dismissed from the court. Rudaki thereafter lived his last years in poverty, dying blind and alone in his hometown in 940 or 941.

The French Iranologist Gilbert Lazard considered Rudaki's first successor to have been Abu-Shakur Balkhi, who composed many mathnavis, notably the Afarīn-nāma.

== Works ==
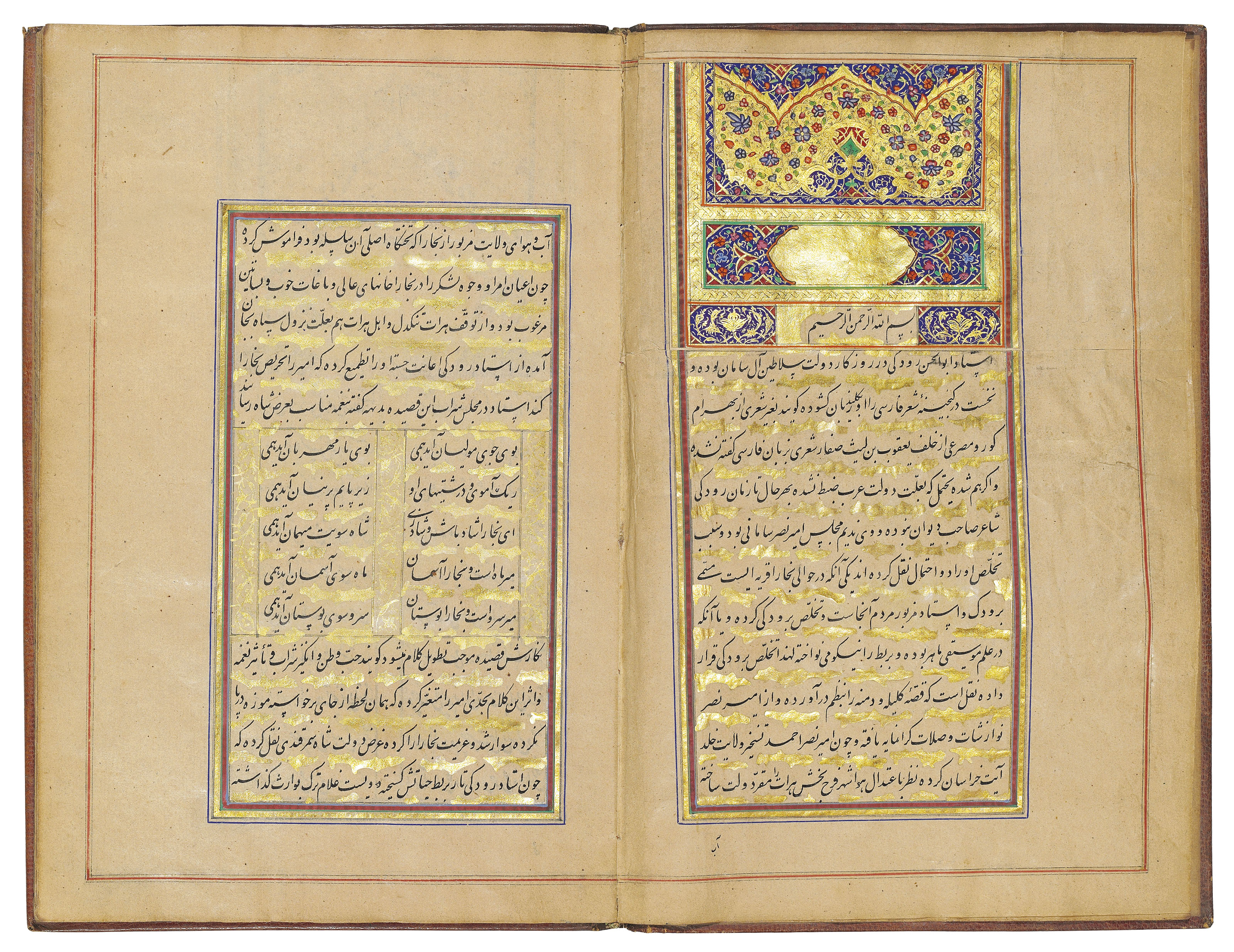
Rudaki's poetry in a Persian manuscript created in Qajar Iran, dated January/February 1866

According to Asadi Tusi, the divan (collection of short poems) of Rudaki consisted of more than 180,000 verses, but most of it has been lost. What little remains of Rudaki's writings, mostly single verses, can be found in Persian dictionaries, particularly the Lughat-i Furs of Asadi Tusi. A few complete poems have also survived, most notably a qasida (eulogy or ode) consisting of almost 100 verses quoted in the anonymous Tarikh-i Sistan. The qasida was dedicated to Abu Ja'far Ahmad ibn Muhammad, who ruled the region of Sistan as a Samanid governor from 923 to 963. In it, Rudaki calls Abu Ja'far an aristocrat of Sasanian ancestry and "pride of Iran", thus indicating a sense of continuity in Iranian identity from the Sasanian to the Samanid period. For this poem, Abu Ja'far rewarded Rudaki with 10,000 dinars.

Rudaki's best known work is his versification of the Kalila wa-Dimna, a collection of Indian fables. Nasr II had ordered Bal'ami to translate the book from Arabic to Persian, and then appointed "interpreters" to read it out loud, so that Rudaki, who was blind, could versify it. Only a few of the verses of Rudaki's Kalila wa-Dimna have survived (François de Blois identified about 50, while Michel Epinette writes that there are about 120). Some of them have been identified in the Lughat-i Furs. Other verses by Rudaki have been identified as belonging to the story of Sindbad and the Seven Ministers. Rudaki's surviving poetry is generally easy for literate native Persian readers to understand despite variations in terminology, word forms, and phrase and sentence patterns.

Although Rudaki displayed pro-Isma'ili sympathies in his writings, his poetry is fully secular in nature. Islam was firmly established by the 10th century; however, Persians still remembered their deep-rooted Zoroastrian history. Rudaki was more prone to evoke ancient Iranian and Zoroastrian notions instead of Muslim ones. Some of Rudaki's poems were written in the pre-Islamic andarz style, i.e., ethical teachings, friendly criticism and advice for correct behavior in both private and public. An example of Rudaki's Zoroastrian roots can be seen in an excerpt where he is talking about his patron:

It's a puzzle, describing his grace and will:
He is the Avesta in wisdom, the Zand in essence...

== Legacy and assessment ==
Rudaki is considered to have been the first major poet to write in New Persian. Although he was predated by other poets who wrote in New Persian, such as Abu Hafs Sughdi (died 902), most of their work has not survived. In Iran, Rudaki is acknowledged as the "founder of New Persian poetry" and in Tajikistan as the "father of Tajik literature", (Note: Tajik is a form of New Persian spoken in Central Asia. It is the official language of Tajikistan, where it is written in an altered Cyrillic script.) both claims which according to the Iranologist Richard Foltz are not contradictory. Rudaki's life is depicted in the 1957 Soviet film A Poet's Fate, directed by Boris Kimyagarov and written by Satim Ulugzade (died 1997). The following year, the latter wrote a play focused on Rudaki, entitled Rudaki, which was the first Tajik biographical drama.

The 1100th anniversary of Rudaki's birth was commemorated by Iran and the Tajik Soviet Socialist Republic in 1958, who together held a conference which was joined by several eminent Iranian and Tajik academics. It was during this period that Rudaki's reputed burial place in Panjrud, near Panjakent, Tajikistan, was discovered using the research of Tajik scholar Sadriddin Ayni. The Soviet archaeologist and anthropologist Mikhail Mikhaylovich Gerasimov (died 1970) dug out and analyzed Rudaki's remains, which he used to recreate the latter's face on a sculpture. Following the collapse of the Soviet Union, Rudaki started to become a stronger representation of Tajik identity and also reinforced their ties to the rest of the Persian-speaking world.

According to Nile Green, Rudaki "heralded a new era for Persian letters." The Iranologist François de Blois states that Rudaki "was the most celebrated Persian poet prior to Ferdowsi." Following his death, Rudaki continued to remain a highly popular figure for around two centuries, until the Mongol period, where he became unpopular amongst the poets of that time who favoured a "highly mannered style" of poetry. However, he had not been forgotten, as demonstrated by the attribution of his name to the Pseudo-Diwan-i Rudaki, called "one of the notorious literary frauds" by de Blois. Scholars such as Hasan ibn Luft Allah al-Razi in the 17th century and Reza-Qoli Khan Hedayat in the 19th century easily recognized that the Pseudo-Diwan-i Rudaki was mostly composed of poems by Qatran Tabrizi (died after 1088), while the rest were already-known poems of Rudaki that had been mentioned in tadhkiras (biographical dictionaries).

During the 19th century, Rudaki experienced a resurgence in popularity along with other ancient Khorasani poets, whose plain and straightforward style was reevaluated. In the 20th century, Rudaki's qasida "Bu-ye ju-ye Mulian" (The fragrance of Mulian Creek) was set to music by Ruhollah Khaleqi and performed as a duet by the famous vocalists Marzieh and Gholam-Hossein Banan. The song is said to have been commissioned by the Iranian government for Radio Tehran and was one of two songs that "dominated" radio programmes and record sales in the years following the 1953 Iranian coup d'état, which restored the political power of the Shah, Mohammad Reza Pahlavi. According to Peyman Vahabzadeh, the song "literally celebrates the return of Mohammed Reza Shah to power" using Rudaki's words, which called on the Samanid emir to return to Bukhara from Herat. (Note: See Epinette 2022 for the anecdote about this poem's composition.)

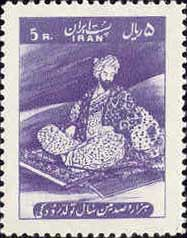
Stamp celebrating the 1100 anniversary of Rudaki's birthday, issued by Pahlavi Iran in 1942

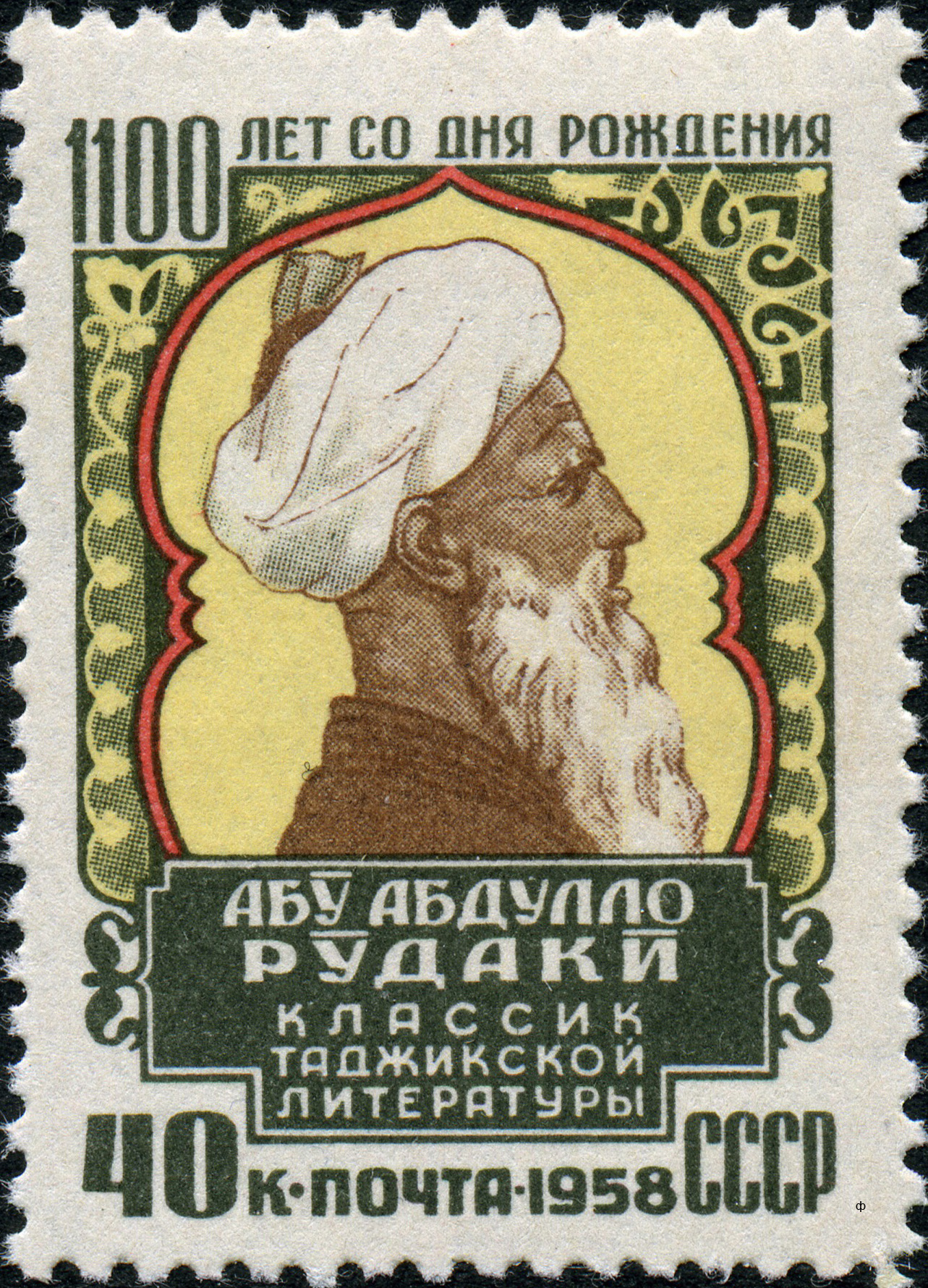
Stamp celebrating the 1100 anniversary of Rudaki's birthday, issued by the Soviet Union in 1958

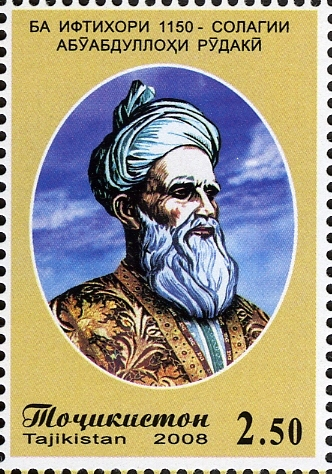
Stamp of Rudaki, issued by Tajikistan in 2008

== Sources ==
- Ashraf, Ahmad (2006). "Iranian identity iii. Medieval Islamic period". In Yarshater, Ehsan (ed.). Encyclopædia Iranica. Vol. XIII/5: Iran X. Religions in Iran–Iraq V. Safavid period. London and New York: Routledge & Kegan Paul. pp. 507–522. ISBN 978-0-933273-93-1.
- Bertels, E. E. (1960). Istoriia persidsko-tadzhikskoĭ literatury История персидско-таджикской литературы [History of Perso-Tajik literature]. Izbrannye trudy (in Russian). Moscow: Izdatelʹstvo vostochnoĭ literatury.
- Bosworth, C.E. (1975). "The Ṭāhirids and Ṣaffārids". In Frye, Richard N. (ed.). The Cambridge History of Iran: From the Arab Invasion to the Saljuqs. Vol. 4. Cambridge: Cambridge University Press. pp. 90–135. ISBN 0-521-20093-8.
- Bosworth, C.E. & Crowe, Yolande (1995). "Sāmānids". In Bosworth, C. E.; van Donzel, E.; Heinrichs, W. P. & Lecomte, G. (eds.). The Encyclopaedia of Islam, Second Edition. Volume VIII: Ned–Sam. Leiden: E. J. Brill. ISBN 978-90-04-09834-3.
- De Blois, François (1971). "Rūdakī". In Lewis, B.; Ménage, V. L.; Pellat, Ch. & Schacht, J. (eds.). The Encyclopaedia of Islam, Second Edition. Volume III: H–Iram. Leiden: E. J. Brill. OCLC 495469525.
- De Blois, François (2004). Persian Literature – A Bio-Bibliographical Survey: Poetry of the Pre-Mongol Period (Volume V). Routledge. ISBN 978-0947593476.
- Bruijn, J.T.P. de (1978). "Iran, vii.—Literature". In van Donzel, E.; Lewis, B.; Pellat, Ch. & Bosworth, C. E. (eds.). The Encyclopaedia of Islam, Second Edition. Volume IV: Iran–Kha. Leiden: E. J. Brill. pp. 52–75. ISBN 978-90-04-05745-6. OCLC 758278456.
- Epinette, Michèle (2022). "Rudaki". In Yarshater, Ehsan (ed.). Encyclopædia Iranica (Online ed.). Encyclopædia Iranica Foundation.
- Foltz, Richard (2019). A History of the Tajiks: Iranians of the East. Bloomsbury Publishing. ISBN 978-1784539559.
- Green, Nile (2019). "Introduction: The Frontiers of the Persianate World (ca. 800–1900)". In Green, Nile (ed.). The Persianate World: The Frontiers of a Eurasian Lingua Franca. University of California Press. pp. 1–72. ISBN 978-0520972100.
- Hillmann, Michael Craig (2022). "Use of Translations of Classic Persian Poems in the Study of Persian". The Routledge Handbook of Persian Literary Translation. Routledge. pp. 334–385. ISBN 978-0367510411.
- Lazard, G. (1975). "The Rise of the New Persian Language". In Frye, Richard N. (ed.). The Cambridge History of Iran: From the Arab Invasion to the Saljuqs. Vol. 4. Cambridge: Cambridge University Press. pp. 595–633. ISBN 0-521-20093-8.
- Negmatov, N. N. (1998). "The Samanid state". History of Civilizations of Central Asia, Volume IV. Unesco. ISBN 978-9231034671.
- Paul, Ludwig (2000). "Persian Language i. Early New Persian". Encyclopædia Iranica, online edition. New York.
- Perry, John (2009). "Tajik ii. Tajik Persian". Encyclopaedia Iranica.
- Perry, John R. (2011). "Persian". In Edzard, Lutz; de Jong, Rudolf (eds.). Encyclopedia of Arabic Language and Linguistics. Brill Online.
- Rypka, Jan (1968). History of Iranian Literature. Springer Netherlands. ISBN 978-9401034814.
- Starr, S. Frederick (2015). Lost Enlightenment: Central Asia's Golden Age from the Arab Conquest to Tamerlane. Princeton University Press. ISBN 978-0691165851.
- Tabatabai, Sassan (2010). Father of Persian Verse: Rudaki and His Poetry. Leiden University Press. ISBN 978-9087280925.
- Vahabzadeh, Peyman (2022). The Art of Defiance: Dissident Culture and Militant Resistance in 1970s Iran. Edinburgh University Press. ISBN 978-1-4744-9225-6.
