= Hossein Gol-e-Golab =

Iranian scientist and musician (1895–1984)

- حسین گل‌گلاب
- Born: Hossein Gol-e-Golab; 1895; Tehran, Qajar Iran
- Died: 13 March 1985 (aged 89–90)
- Education: Dar al-Fonun
- Occupations: polymath scholar and musician
- Notable work: Ey Iran

Hossein Gol-e-Golâb (Persian: حسین گل‌گلاب; 1895 – 13 March 1985), also known as Hoseyn Golgolâb (Persian pronunciation: [hoˈsejn ˌgol(e)goˈlɒːb]), was an Iranian polymath, scholar and musician. He is best known as the author of the lyrics to "Ey Iran".

Gol-e-Golâb was born in Tehran, and studied at the Elmiya School and Dar al-Fonun.

Gol-e-Golâb never lost his interest in music, finding time to translate Western operas into Persian while teaching and writing on botany and serving on the Academy of Persian Language and Literature, to which he was appointed in 1935.

== Ey Iran ==
The anthem was created during World War II. In September 1941, Allied forces occupied Iran following the Anglo-Soviet invasion that overthrew Reza Shah. Hossein Gol-e-Golab was inspired to write a poem on Iranian nationalism when he saw Allied flags waving from an Iranian military barracks in Tehran. That image strengthened his resolve to compose a patriotic piece reflecting Iranian spirit in spite of the occupation.

According to Gol-e-Golab, a confrontation between a British soldier and an Iranian officer further encouraged him to write the poem. Khaleghi later set it to music, and Banan recorded the vocal performance.

Gol-e-Golab later said:

In 1944, the footsteps of the invading armies in the streets were enough to rattle any patriot and inspired me to write this anthem. Professor Ruhollah Khaleghi wrote the music and, despite all the political opposition, it found its way into the heart and soul of the people.

During the transitional period in the immediate aftermath of the 1979 Iranian Revolution, the composition briefly served as the country's de facto national anthem under the interim government.
