= Abu Zura'ah al-Mu'ammari =

10th-century poet

Abu Zura'ah al-Mu'ammari al-Jurjani (fl. 10th-century) was a poet of the Samanid era, who is only known from the writings of the historian Awfi (d. 1242). In the text, an unnamed amir of Khurasan asks Abu Zura'ah if he is able to write poems on the level of Rudaki. He subsequently composed three verses, declaring his superiority over Rudaki.

== Sources ==
- de Blois, Francois (2004). Persian Literature - A Bio-Bibliographical Survey: Poetry of the Pre-Mongol Period (Volume V). Routledge. ISBN 978-0947593476.
