= Dhoti =

Ethnic wrap garment worn by men in the Indian subcontinent

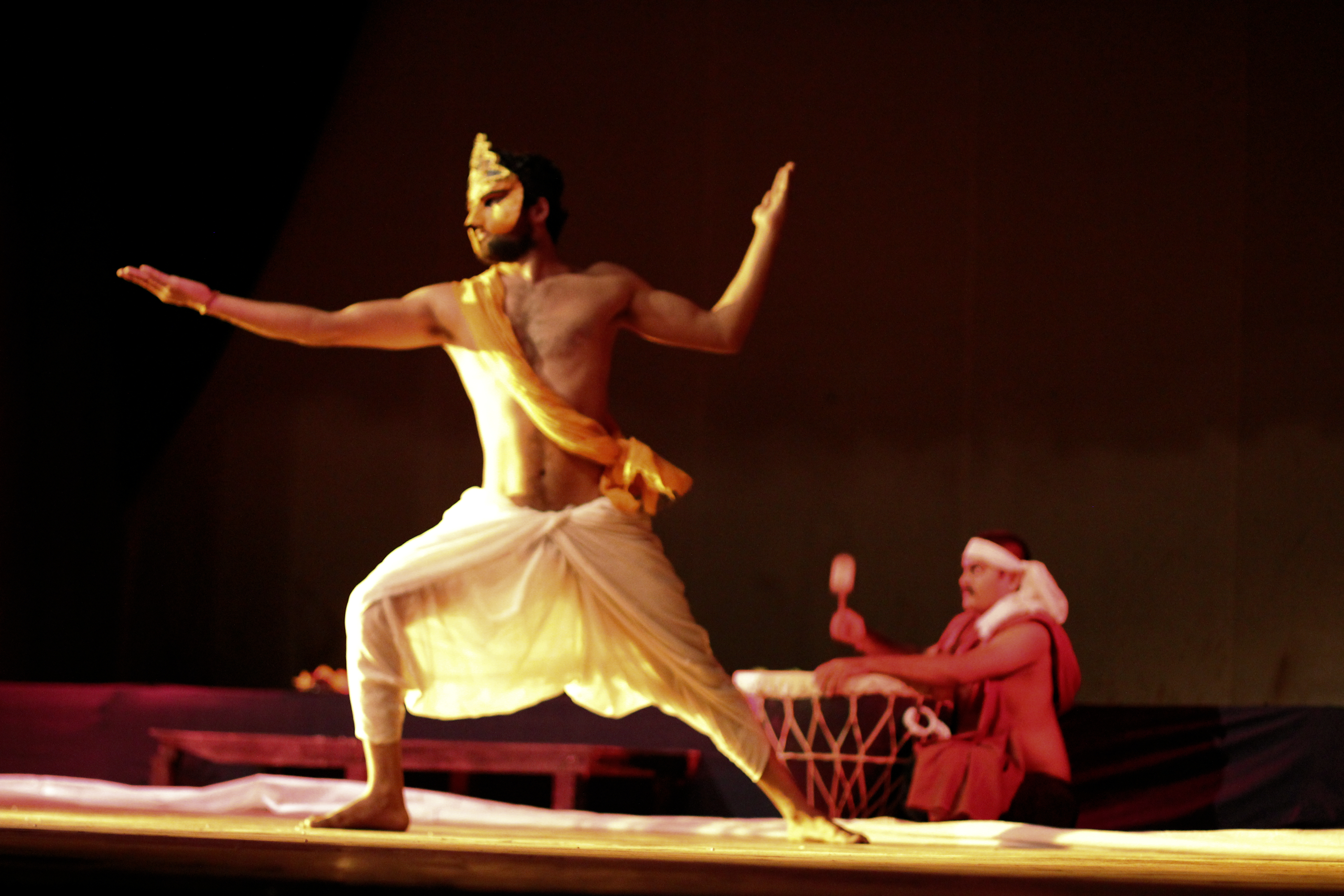
A Dogra dancer wears a dhoti, at a theatre in Jammu.

The dhoti is an ankle-length breechcloth, wrapped around the waist and the legs, in resemblance to the shape of trousers. The dhoti is a garment of ethnic wear for men in the Indian subcontinent. The dhoti is fashioned out of a rectangular piece of unstitched cloth, of usually around 4 yards (3.7 m) in length.

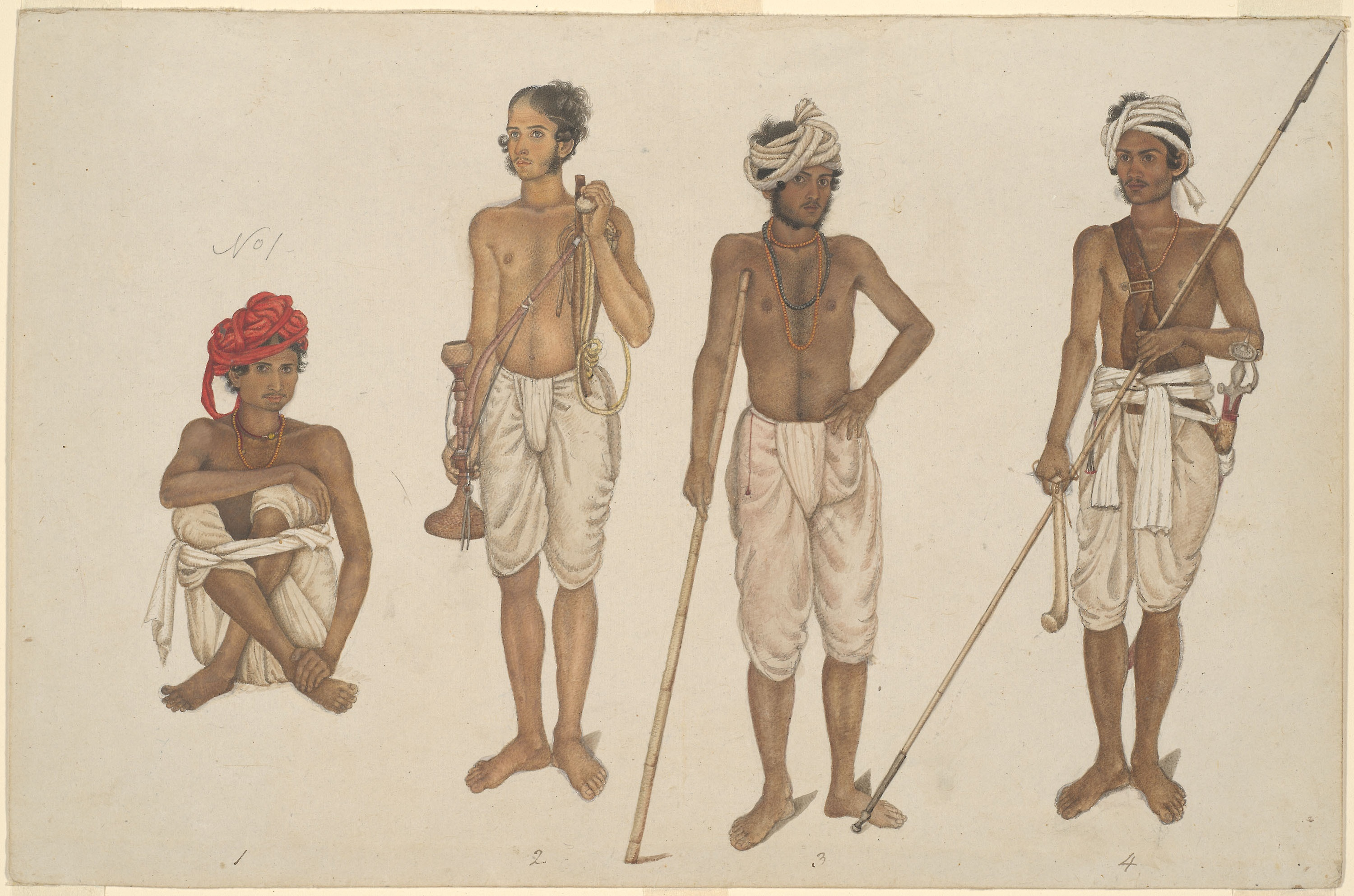
An illustration of dhoti-clad recruits in the British Indian Army.

The dhoti is the male counterpart to the sari, worn by women to religious and secular ceremonies (functions). A pitambar is a yellow silk dhoti worn on auspicious occasions. Dhotis must not be confused with "readymade panchakachams" or "dhoti pants", which are a new ready to wear trend, popular among women and typical of children. Although the terms mundu or veshti are used interchangeably with "dhoti", they are different from the dhoti, which is "looped" or wrapped around the legs, in the form of trousers or pants. The dhoti is better known as panchakacham in South India, which may even be worn while doing dances such as the moonwalk.

== Etymology ==
The unstitched dhoti is also referred to as "dhautra" (IPA: /dʱɑwtrɐ/) in Sanskrit, which means rope or cord. It evolved from the ancient antriya, which was passed in between the legs, tucked at the back and covered the legs loosely, then flowed into long pleats at front of the legs, the same way it is worn today as formal dhoti. While a casual and short dhoti wraps around both legs firmly, in this style the back side of the dhoti is pulled to the front and tucked at the waist, before tucking the two loose ends at back, creating firmly fitted trouser-like dhoti that wraps around both legs. This style is more commonly worn by farmers and martial artists. Stitched garments became popular in the Indian subcontinent, with the coming of Persians, Greeks, and "barbarians"; nonetheless, the dhoti prevailed in sakaccha as well as vikaccha forms.

== History ==
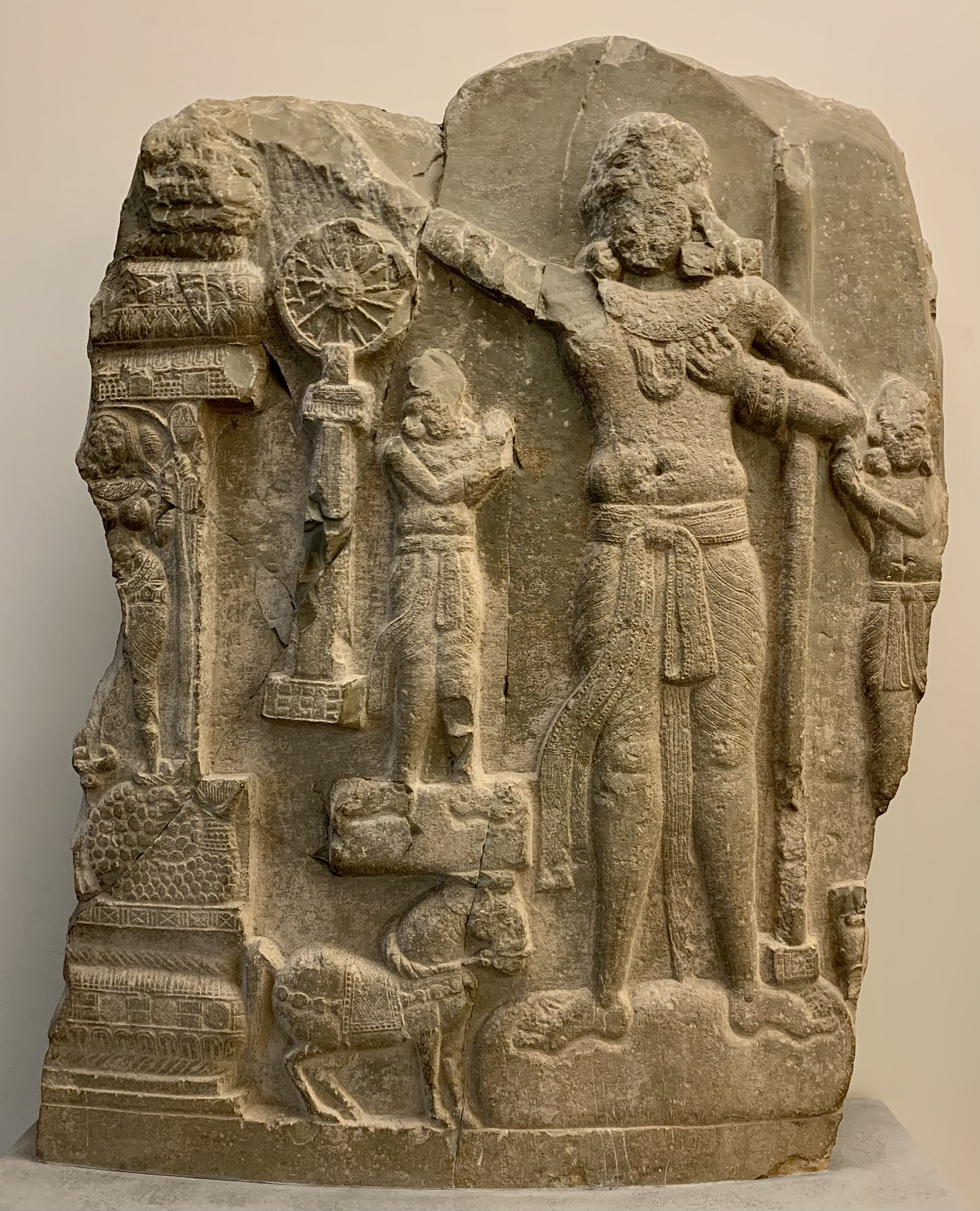
Ashoka of the Mauryan Empire depicted on the Amaravati Stupa, 1st century CE.

The dhoti originated from the ancient antariya, which was passed in between the legs, tucked at the back and covered the legs loosely, then flowed into long pleats at front of the legs, the same way it is worn today as formal dhoti. A l and short dhoti wraps around both legs firmly, in this style the back side of the dhoti is pulled to the front and tucked at the waist, before tucking the two loose ends at back, creating firmly fitted trouser-like dhoti that wraps around both legs. According to G. S. Ghurye, this style is more commonly worn by farmers and martial artists.

The earliest epigraphical depictions of the Dhoti were during the Mauryan Empire. In the Sunga period, there were two broad modes of wearing the dhoti, the sakaccha and the vikaccha. Stitched garments became popular in the Indian subcontinent, with the coming of Persians, Greeks, and "barbarians"; nonetheless, the dhoti prevailed in sakaccha as well as vikaccha forms. In the sakaccha way, the cloth passed between the legs and was tucked at the back; vikaccha meant wearing the dhoti similar to a lungi.

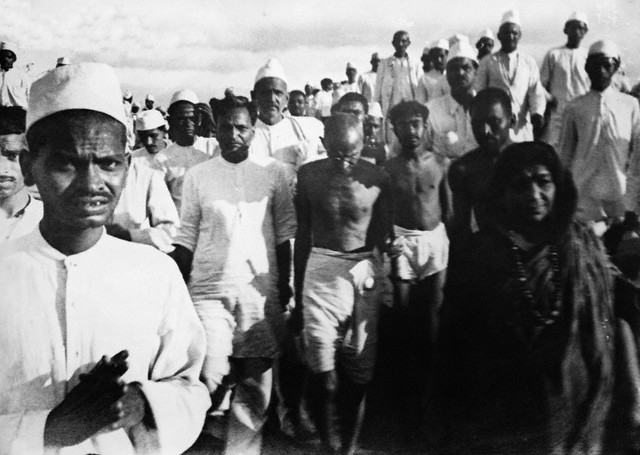
M K Gandhi in 1935

During British rule in colonial India, the dhoti remained a national symbol of resistance and cultural identity when worn without a shirt. At the height of the Indian Independence Movement, weaving khadi was a symbol of the swadeshi movement. In 1921, Gandhi championed the dhoti, often topless (without a kurta or shirt), to promote and identify with the handicrafts produced by the rural and the poor of his homeland.

== Names ==
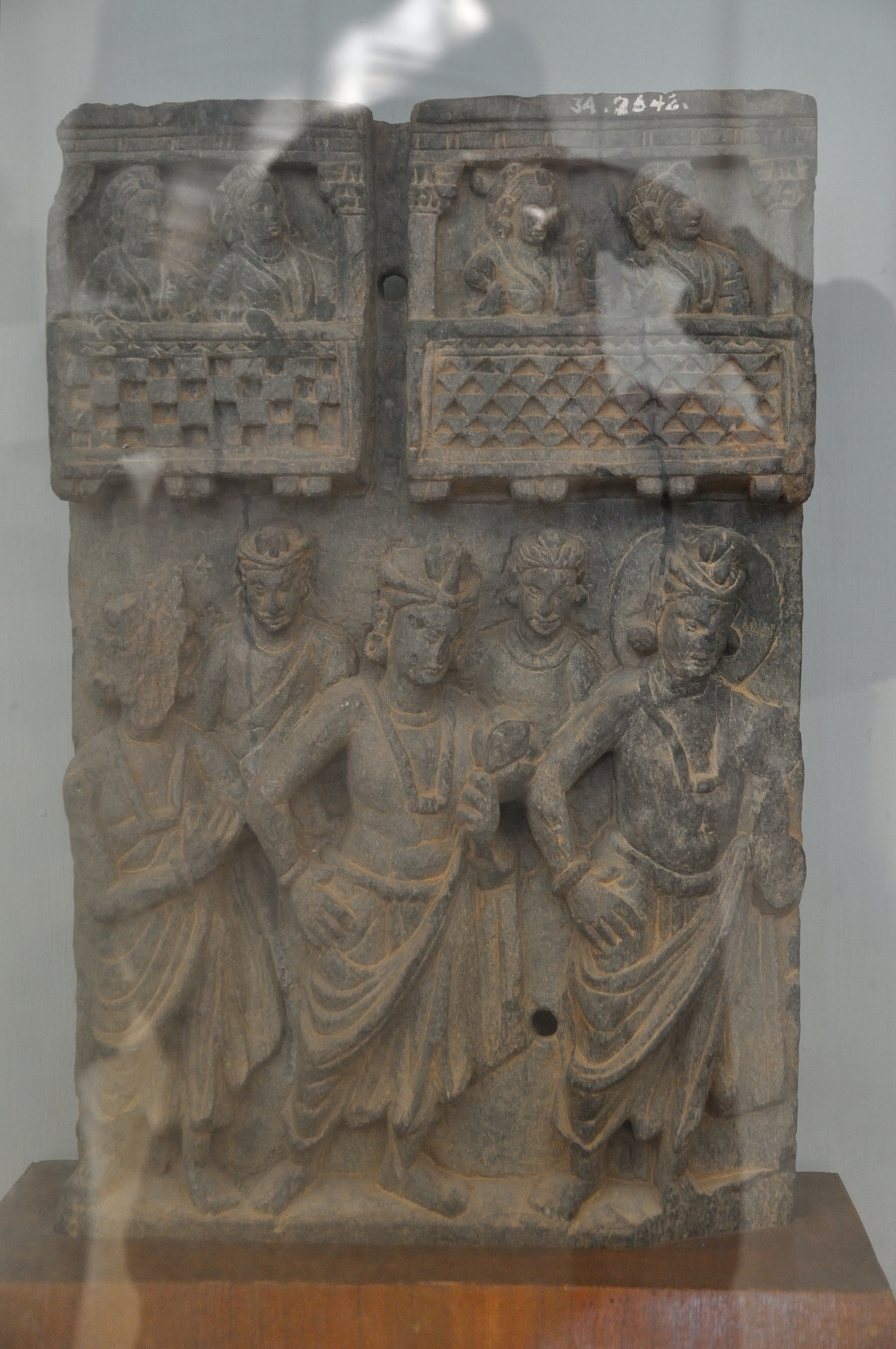
Relief depicting men in anatariya and uttariya, 1st century CE

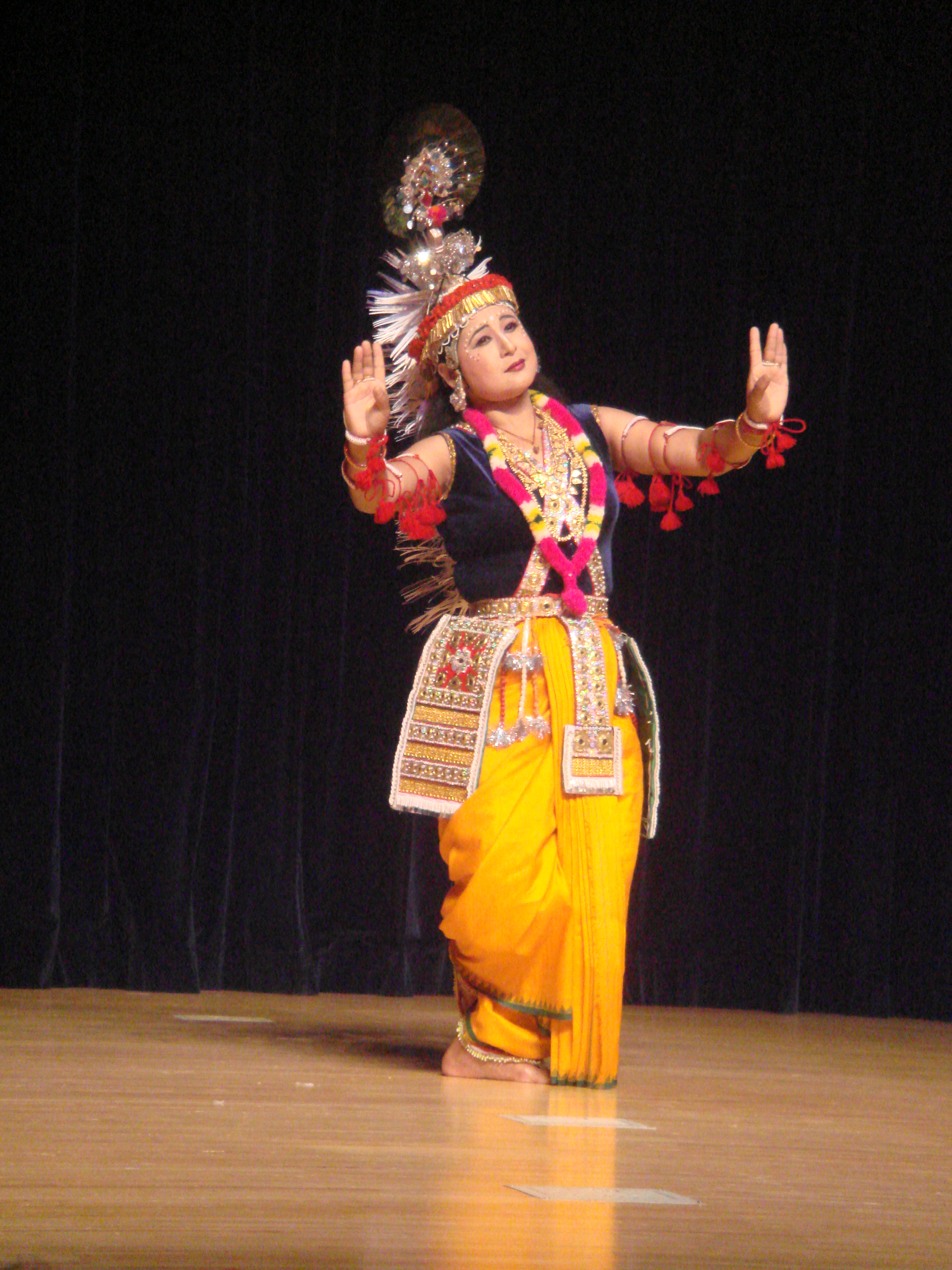
A Manipuri dancer dressed as Krishna in yellow dhoti

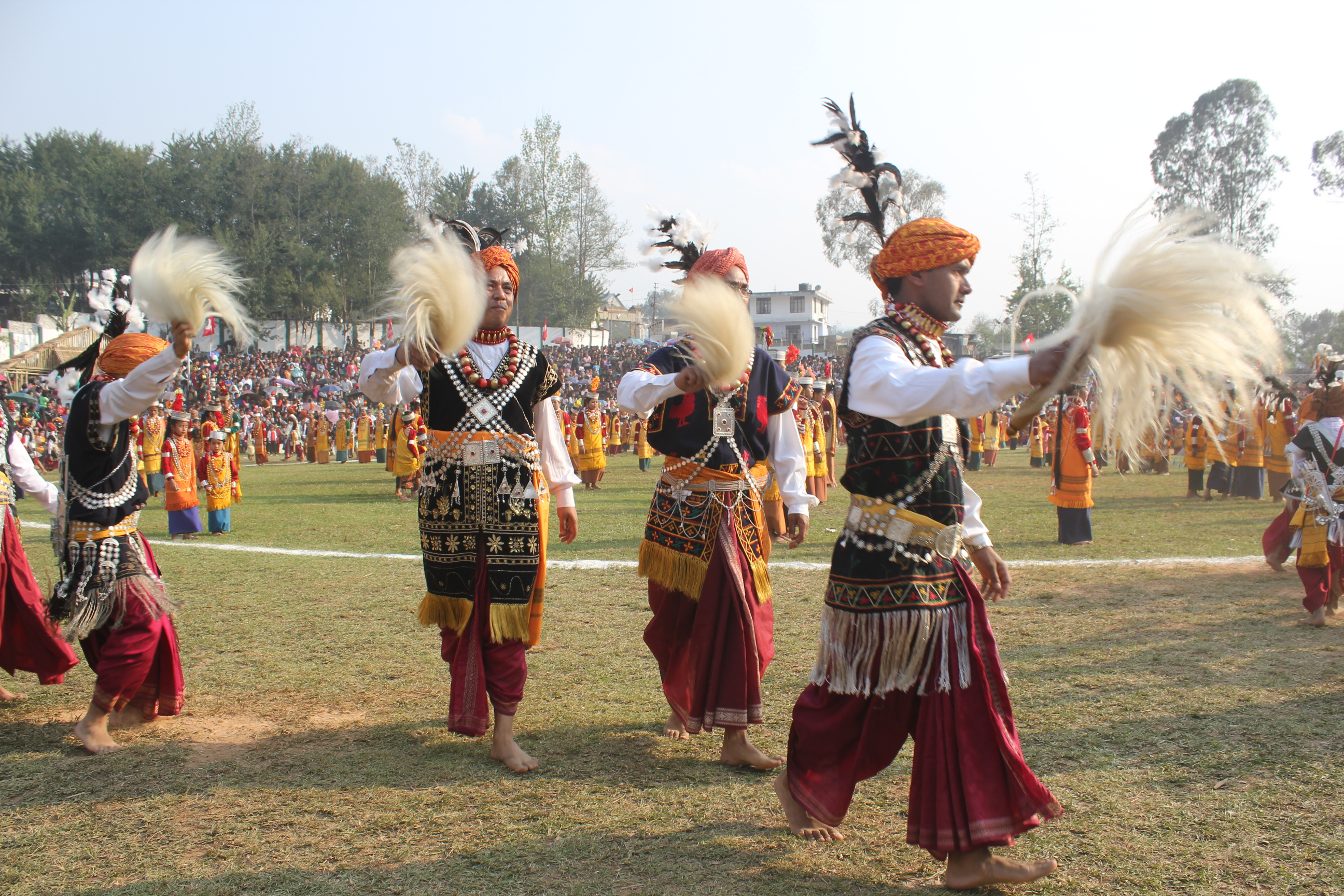
Khasi folk dancers wearing "Jaiñboh" dhotis and other ethnic garb

The garment is known by various names based on language, such as:

Native script	Transliteration	Language or region
চুৰিয়া, ধুতি	Suriya, Dhuti	Assamese
ধুতি	Dhuti	Bengali
ધૉતિયુ	Dhotiyu	Gujarati
धोती	Dhotī	Hindi, Maithili, Nepali and Pali
मर्दानी	Mardānī	Hindi
ಧೋತ್ರ ಕಚ್ಚೆ ಪಂಚೆ	Dhotra; Kachche Panche	Kannada
धोंतर, आंगोस्तर, आड नेसचे, पुडवे	Dhontar, Āṅgostara, Āḍa nesace Puḍave	Konkani
മുണ്ട്	Muṇṭ‌	Malayalam
धोतर	Dhotar ^{a}	Marathi
ଧୋତି	Dhotī	Odia
ਚਾਦਰਾ	Chaadar	Punjabi
வேட்டி	Vaetti	Tamil
పంచె, ధోవతి	Pañce	Telugu
دھوتی	Dhoti	Urdu
^{a} In Marathi, a dhotar is not the same as a pancha (plural panche). While the former is worn around the waist, the latter is normally a towel used after bathing (compare below).

== Custom and usage ==
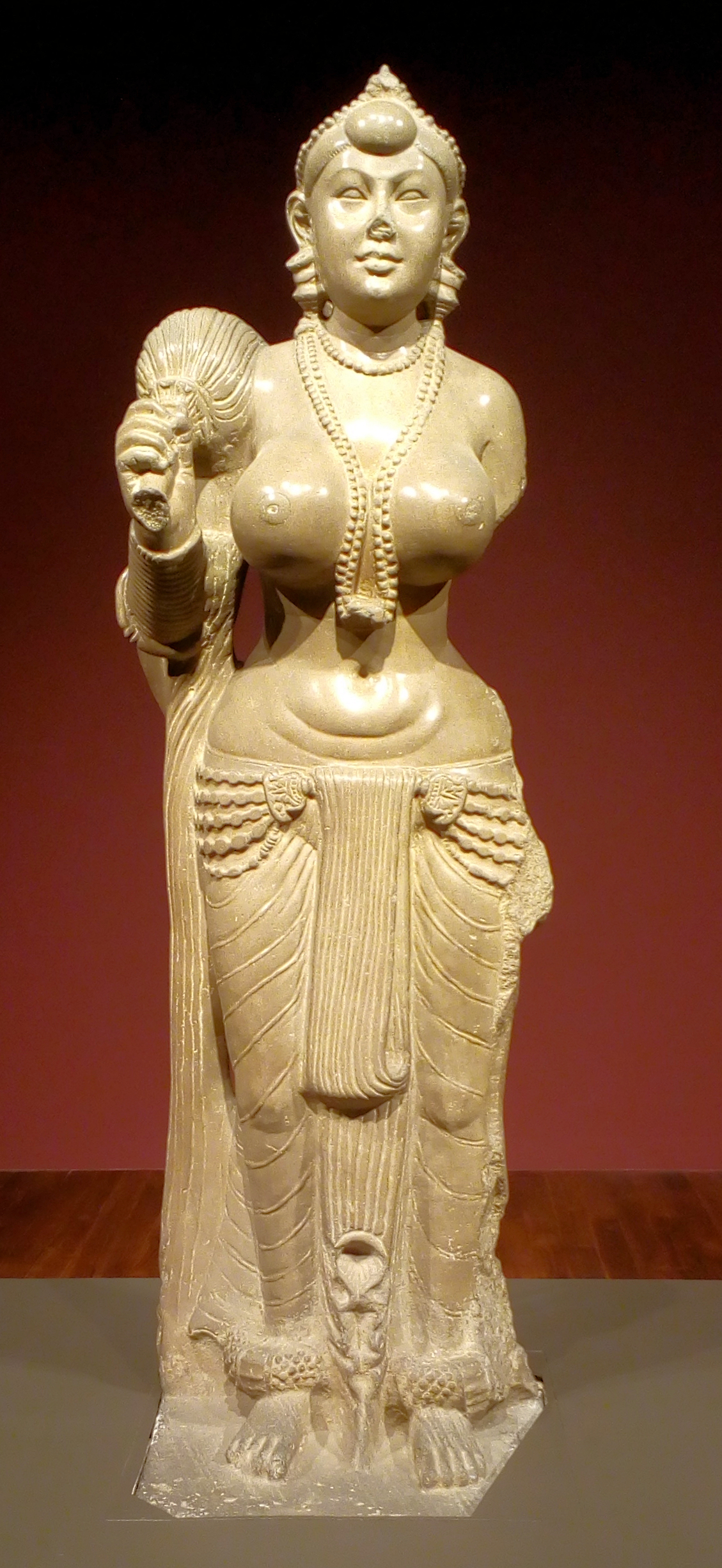

The pancha is worn by many conservative Jain men when they visit derasars or basadis for puja, as unstitched clothing is believed to be "less permeable to pollution" and therefore more appropriate for religious rituals than other garments. They also wear a loose and unstitched cloth, shorter than the pancha on top.

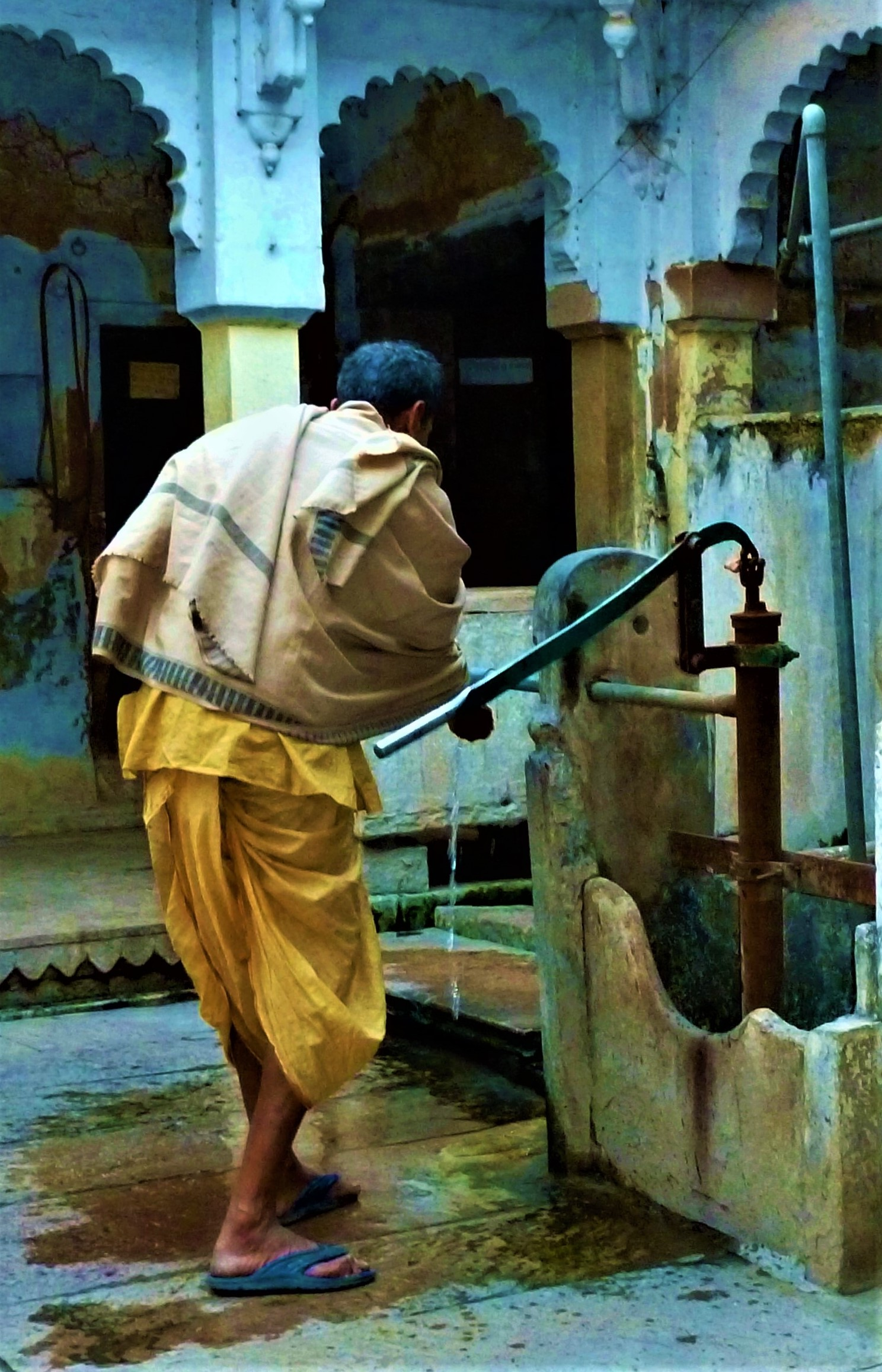
A Benaresi man in dhoti with a Central Asian kurta, in Uttar Pradesh.

The International Society for Krishna Consciousness (ISKCON), known for its distinctive dress code, prompts Western adherents to wear pancha, usually of saffron or white cloth folded in ethnic Bengali style. Maharishi Mahesh Yogi was known for wearing a white silk dhoti. Traditionally, men wear the dhoti topless (without upper garments) while entering certain mandirs (Hindu temples) in South India, as stitched garments supposedly counter the energy of the idol. The dhoti is often worn with a shirt in other places.

The dhoti was also worn by Sikhs in the Punjab region etc. Wearing Dhotis was discouraged during the Punjab Subah Movement due to the inter-communal tensions prevalent at the time. The dhothi was also worn by South Canarese Christian men to their pre-nuptial ceremonies, church weddings & receptions until the 1960s; after which they fell out of favour, since then, grooms have been styling the black suit and tie instead.

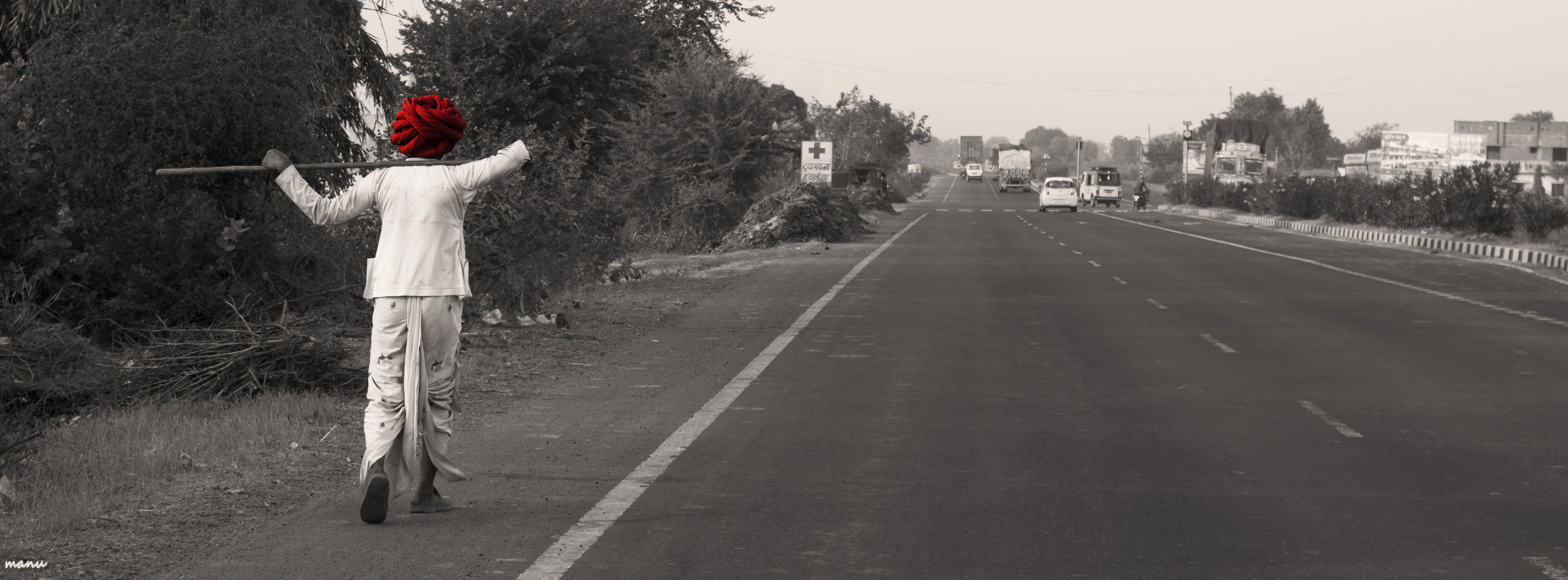
A man in dhoti paired with a short kurta in Rajasthan

There is a distinction between the dhoti and the lungi, a similar garment often worn by people at their homes. The lungi is more casual and comfortable, while the dhoti is considered formal and is sometimes worn by politicians.

== Decline ==
The use of the dhoti an as article of clothing, has declined in comparison to its historical prominence in the Indian subcontinent. However, it is still used in some secular functions and especially in religious settings. While the sari is still draped by many women as daily wear, few men know how to wrap the dhoti and use it every day. The dhoti has been displaced by the English clothes of the British, in urban areas such as Bombay (Mumbai). Historically, there were variations in the styles of wrapping the dhoti based on castes, as in the case of Bombay's Sonars and the Peshva Brahmins. Therefore, English attire has been described as "caste neutral". Dhotis are still worn more in rural areas of India. In urban areas, men in dhotis are often perceived as "poor" and discriminated against in places such as shopping malls. Additionally, with the introduction of kurta-pyjama sets from Central Asia, during the Moghal Empire, pyjamas are often worn instead of dhotis as ethnic menswear.

== Gallery ==
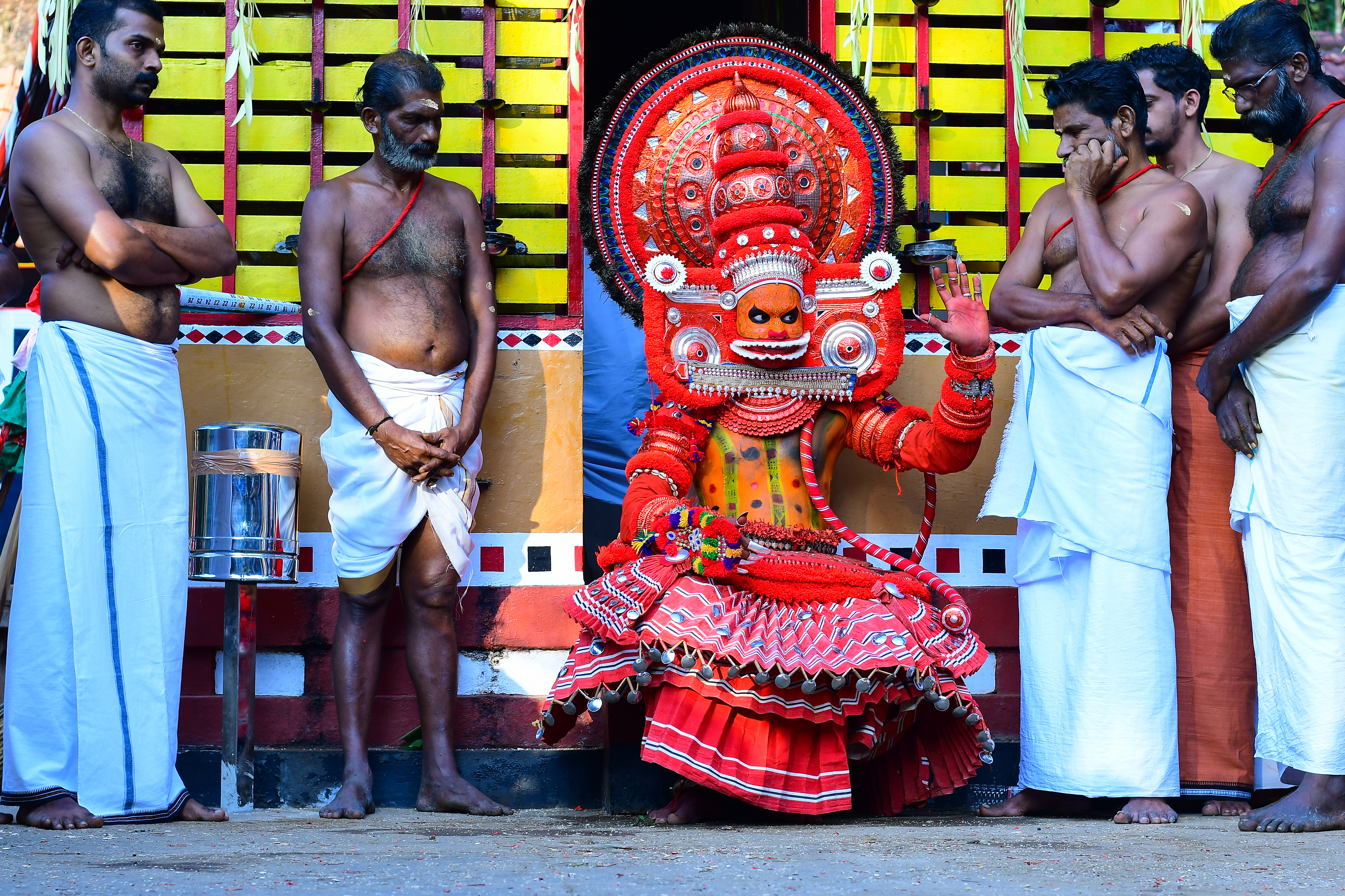
Mundu (dhoti) wearing spectators of theyyam.

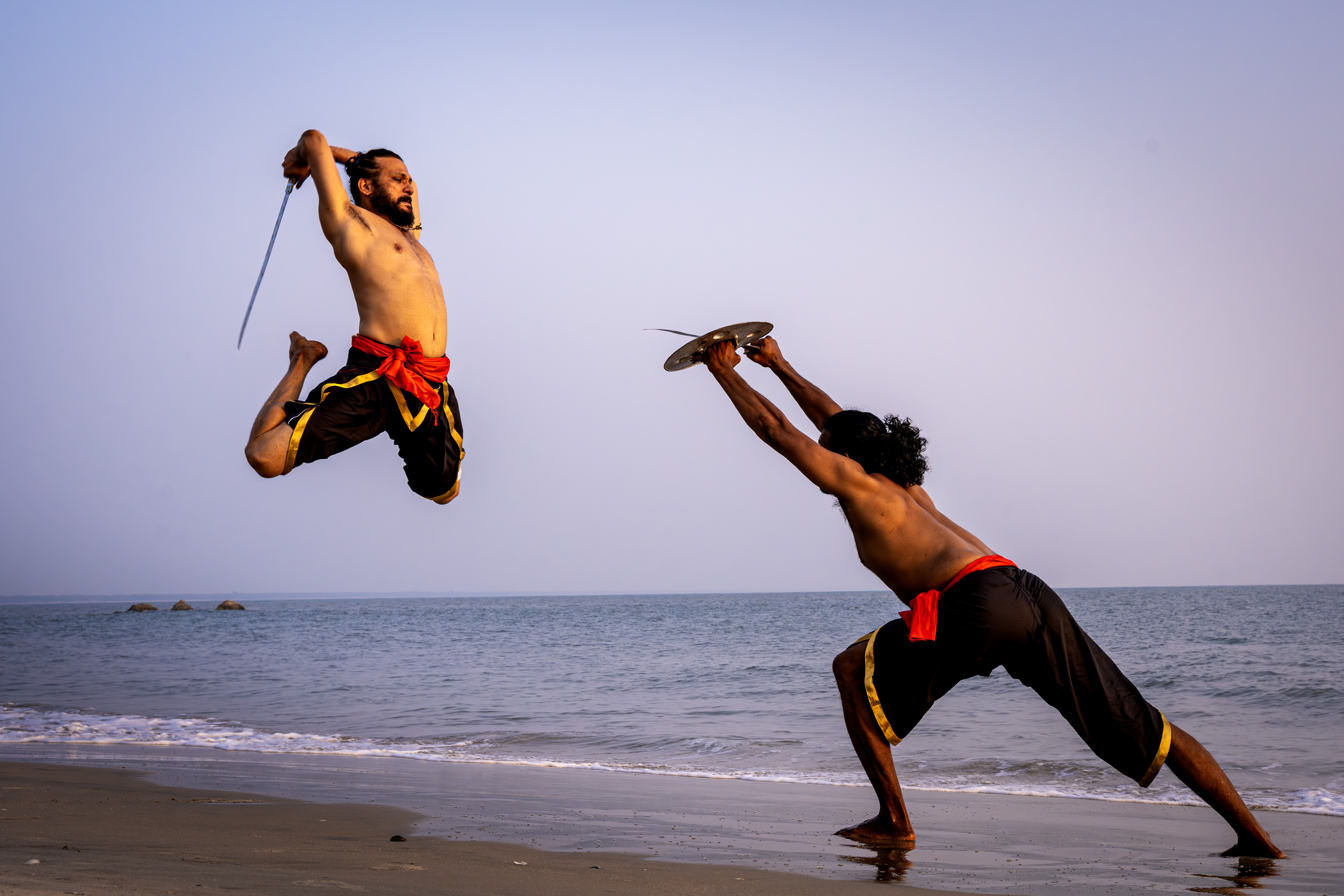
Kalaripayattu martial artists wearing the kalari dhoti.

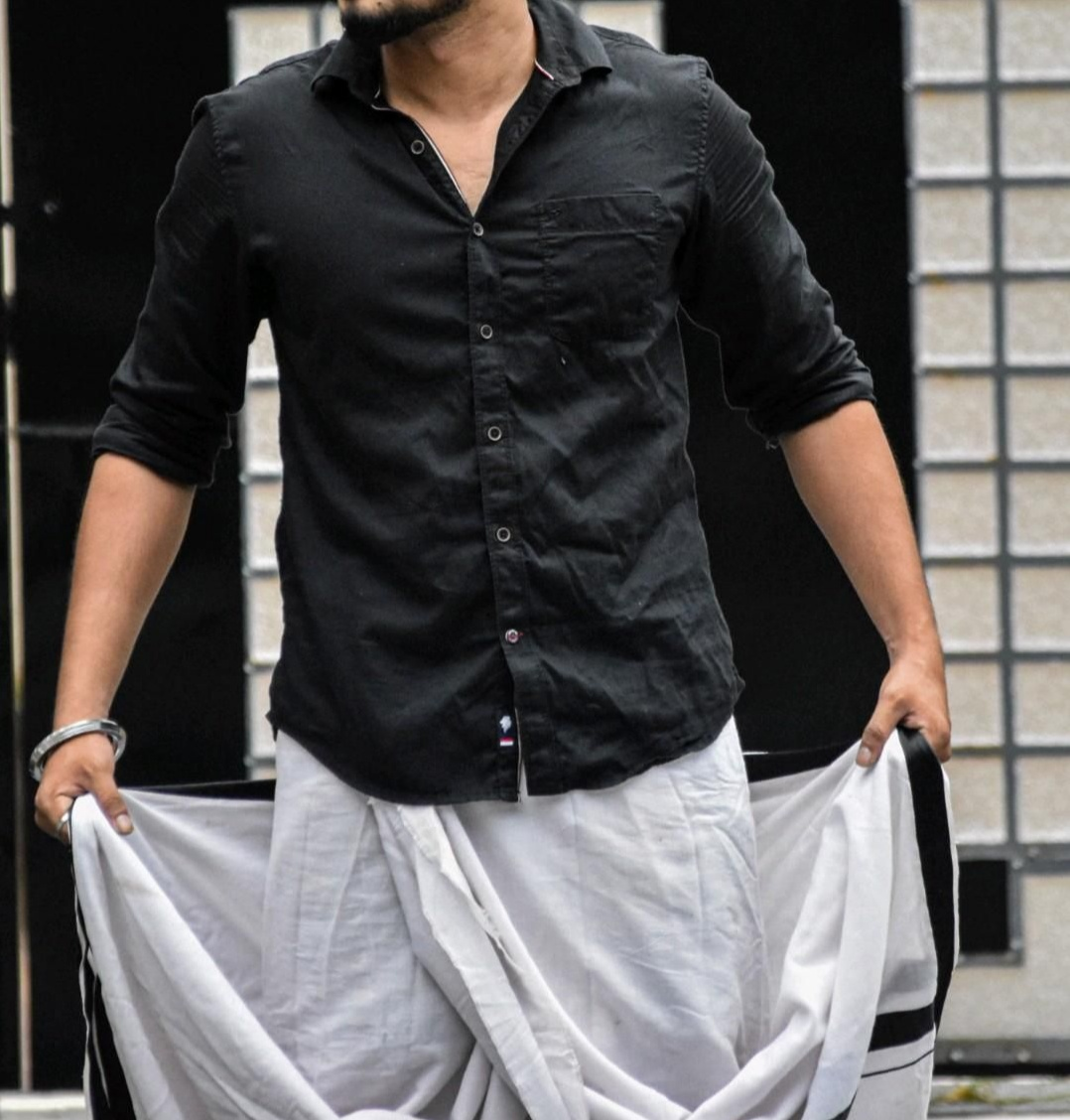
A white mundu paired with a black shirt.

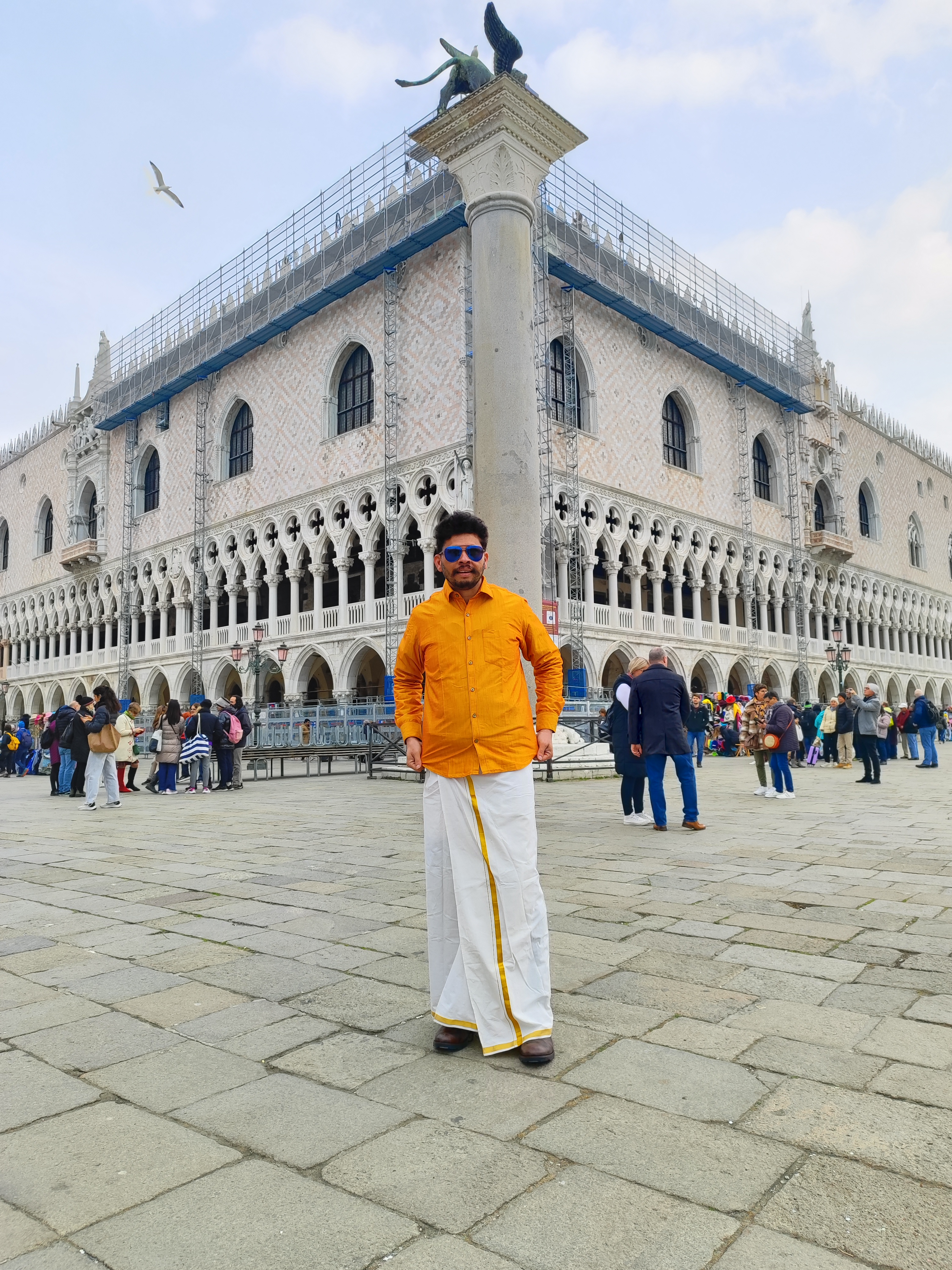
A veshti worn with shirt.

== See also ==
- Dhaut Pariksha
- Dhoti Lota Aur Chowpatty
- Harem pants
- History of clothing in the Indian subcontinent
- Khadi
- Kaupinam
- Longyi
- Pathin
- Sarong
- Sompot Chong Kben
- Sinh (clothing)
- Wrapper (clothing)
