= A Poet's Fate =

- Russian: Судьба поэта
- Directed by: Boris Kimyagarov
- Written by: Satym Uluqzadeh
- Starring: Marat Aripov; Nozukmo Shomansurova; Makhmud Takhiri; Abdulkhamid Nurmatov; Dilbar Kasymova
- Cinematography: Nikolay Olonovskiy
- Music by: Andrey Babaev
- Release date: 1959
- Country: Soviet Union
- Language: Russian

A Poet's Fate (Russian: Судьба поэта) is a 1959 Soviet historical drama film directed by Boris Kimyagarov.

== Plot ==
The film tells about the Iranian poet Rudaki, the founder of Persian poetry.

== Cast ==
- Marat Aripov as Rudaki
- Nozukmo Shomansurova
- Makhmud Takhiri
- Abdulkhamid Nurmatov
- Dilbar Kasymova
- Khodzhakuli Rakhmatullaev
- Sofia Tuibayeva
- Shamsi Dzuraev
- Mukhamejan Kasymov
