= Ruhollah Khaleqi =

Iranian author, composer and conductor (1906–1965)

Ruhollah Khaleqi روح‌الله خالقی
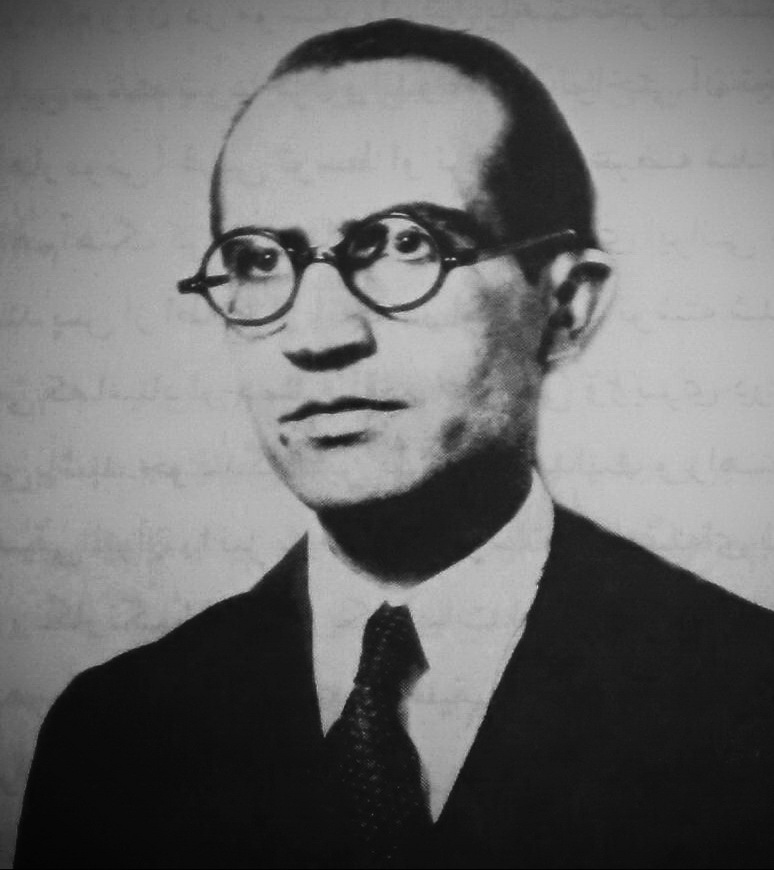

Background information
- Born: 1906; Kerman, Iran
- Died: 12 November 1965 (aged 59) Salzburg, Austria
- Genres: Classical, folk, traditional
- Occupations: Musician, conductor, violinist, songwriter, composer, professor
- Years active: 1924–1965
- Formerly of: Delkash

Ruhollah Khaleqi (Note: Also romanized as Khaleghi) (Persian: روح‌الله خالقی [ˌɹuːɦ(ʔ)olˈlɒːh ˌxɒːleˈɢiː]; 1906 – 12 November 1965) was a prominent Iranian composer, conductor and author. He is best known for composing the patriotic song "Ey Iran".

He was the father of Golnoush Khaleghi—Iran's first female conductor.

== Early life and education ==
Khaleqi was born in Mahan, a small town near Kerman, in a musically minded family. He first became acquainted with the tar, but later started to learn to play the violin.

As soon as Ali-Naqi Vaziri established his school of music, Khaleqi left school and joined Vaziri's school, where he studied for eight years. Soon he became his master's assistant and was placed in charge of teaching music theory.

He later continued his education and obtained a BA in Persian language and literature at the University of Tehran.

== Career ==
Persian National Music Society Orchestra conducted by Khaleqi with Gholam Hossein Banan on vocals, 1940s

In 1944, Khaleqi established the National Music Society. In 1949, he founded the School of National Music and established the Tehran-based National Music Society and Persian National Music Conservatory. After his first journey to the Soviet Union in 1955, he became involved in the Iran-Soviet Society and was selected as a member of its board of directors. He also served as the director of the magazine Payām-e-Novin (پيام نوين).

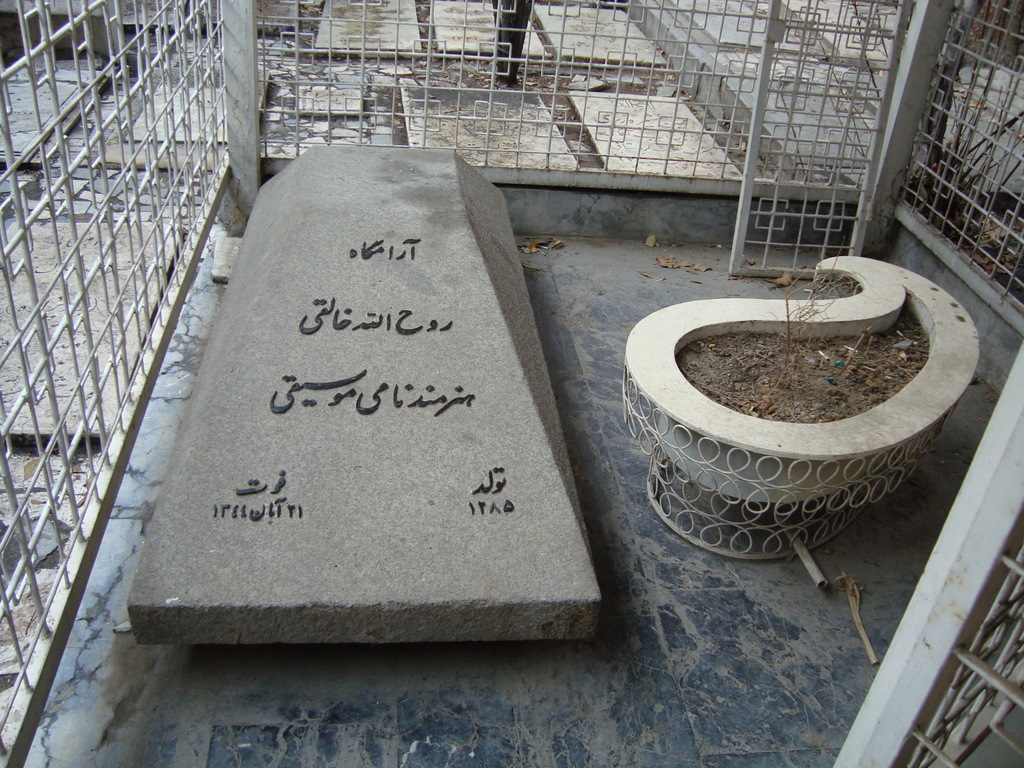
Gravestone of Ruhollah Khaleqi in Zahir o-dowleh cemetery, Darband, Shemiran, Tehran.

For many years, he worked as a musical advisor for Radio Iran and was one of the founders of the program known as Golhā (گل‌ها; lit. 'Flowers'). He also conducted the Golhā Orchestra, for which he composed many pieces and revised the original compositions of his contemporaries as well as older masters, such as Aref Qazvini and Ali Akbar Sheyda. Although revised, the compositions retained all their original characteristics.

He believed that Persian classical music should turn into a polyphonic music to become more attractive.

He died in 1965 in Salzburg, Austria, and was buried in Zahir-od-dowleh cemetery in Darband, Tehran.

== Compositions ==
In addition to musical compositions such as Mey-e Nāb (می ناب; lit. 'Pure Wine'), Āh-e Sahar (آه سحر; lit. 'Ah, Dawn'), Hālā Cherā? (حالا چرا؟; lit. 'Why Now?'), and "Chang‑e Rudaki" (چنگ رودکی; lit. 'Rudaki's Harp'), he composed many other lyrical pieces and hymns, many of which are patriotic. These include works such as "Ey Iran", which was famously performed by Gholam-Hossein Banan and is used as a de facto anthem of the Iranian people.

== Publications ==
His work, The History of Persian Music, which was published in two volumes, took shape during these years.

Other published works of his include Harmony of Western Music, Theory of Eastern Music, and Theory of Persian Music.

== See also ==
- Music of Iran
- List of Iranian musicians
- List of Iranian composers
