= Marzieh =

Marzieh (Arabic: مرضية), (Persian: مرضیه) is a feminine given name frequently used in Persian. In Dari Persian and Urdu it is pronounced as Marzia.

Marzieh is the name of:

- Marzieh (singer) (1924–2010), Tehran-born singer of Persian traditional music
- Marzieh Afkham (born 1962), Iranian diplomat
- Marzieh Boroumand (born 1951), Iranian actress and screenwriter
- Marzieh Gail (1908–1993), American and Iranian Bahá'i writer and translator
- Marzieh Hadidchi (1939–2016), Iranian activist and politician
- Marzieh Hamidi (born 2002), Iranian-born Afghan taekwondo athlete
- Marzieh Meshkini (born 1969), Iranian cinematographer, film director and writer
- Marzieh Rasouli, Iranian journalist
- Marzieh Shah-Daei (born 1962), Iranian official and manager
- Marzieh Vahid-Dastjerdi (born 1959), Iranian university professor and former parliamentarian and the first woman to be a minister after Islamic revolution
- Marzieh Vafamehr, Iranian actress living in Tehran
