= Satim Ulugzade =

Soviet Tajik writer (1911–1997)

Sotim Ulughzoda
- Сотим Улуғзода
- Born: September 11, 1911; Varzyk, Namangan region, Fergana Oblast, Russian Empire
- Died: June 25, 1997 (aged 85); Dushanbe, Tajikistan
- Education: Tajik Institute of Education
- Occupation: Writer

Sotim Ulughzoda (Сотим Улуғзода in Tajik, Russian: Сатим Улугзаде, Satim Ulugzade, born September 11, 1911 — died June 25, 1997) was a Soviet Tajik writer. He was born in Varzyk in the Namangan region of Uzbekistan and was educated at the Tajik Institute of Education in Tashkent. He started publishing in the 1930s and became established as a critic, translator and playwright. He served in the Red Army during the Second World War, and wrote several plays on military themes.

He also wrote several novels and film scripts. His biographical play on the Tajik national poet Rudaki became the basis for the 1959 film The Fate of the Poet. As a translator, Ulugzade translated the works of Lenin, Gorky, Ostrovsky, Chekhov and Goldoni into the Tajik language. He died in Dushanbe in 1997. The Tajik State Institute of Languages is named in his honour.
