= Janaki Ramayana =

Maithili poetic Ramayana based on the life of Goddess Sita

- Author: Pandit Lal Das
- Original title: जानकी रामायण
- Language: Maithili
- Genre: Version of Ramayana
- Publication date: 1980
- Publication place: India

Janaki Ramayana (Maithili: जानकी रामायण ) is a Maithili version of Ramayana in poetic form composed by considering Sita as the principal ideal character.

== Background ==
In the Indian Subcontinent Ramayana is written in different languages. There are around 300 to 1000 versions of Ramayana. From original Sanskrit Ramayana of Valmiki to the Awadhi Ramcharitmanas of Tulsi Das have mainly focused on ideals of Lord Rama. But "Janaki Ramayana" composed by Mahakavi Pandit Lal Das is the unique version of Ramayana which is based on the life of Sita. In this version of Ramayana, the life of Goddess Sita and her infinite powers have been described from the beginning to the end.

== Description ==
In this Ramayana, the form of Goddess Sita has been described as Shakti Swarupa. She has three forms. Her first, second and third forms are Shabda Brahmamayi, the Shakti who incarnated from the Halagra (front part of the plough) in the sacrificial ground of the King Janaka and Avyakt Swarupa respectively. She is described as Adishakti Bhagwati. This version of Ramayana is composed in Maithili poetic language. In this Ramayana the meaning of Sita is said to be "Bhumija" as it is the line ploughed on the earth by a plough. She is also called as presiding goddess of agriculture, Param Vaidehi, Param Janaki, and "Janaanaam Kule Jaata" (born in the family of people), etc. There are three Khandas in this Janaki Ramayana. They are named as Kathārambha, Lakshmikaanda and Radhakaanda. There are total 25 parts including all these Khandas. The first Khanda known as Kathārambha contains parts from 1 to 8, the second Khanda known as Lakshmikaanda contains parts from 9 to 14 and last Khanda known as Radhakaanda contains parts from 15 to 25.
