= Golnoush Khaleghi =

Iranian musician (1941–2021)

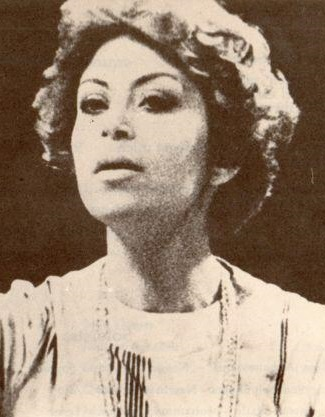
- Khaleghi in the 1970s
- Born: 6 January 1941; Tehran, Imperial State of Iran
- Died: 14 February 2021 (aged 80); Washington, D.C., United States
- Occupations: Musician, composer, conductor
- Parent: Ruhollah Khaleghi (father)

Golnoush Khaleghi (Note: Also romanized as Golnush Khaleqi) (Persian: گلنوش خالقی [golˈnuːʃ ˌxɒːleˈɢiː]; 6 January 1941 – 14 February 2021) was an Iranian-American musician and conductor. She was Iran's first female conductor.

== Early life and education ==
Khaleghi was born in Tehran and studied at the Persian National Music Conservatory, the Mozarteum Salzburg, and later at the University of Wisconsin.

== Career ==
From 1975 to 1979, Khaleghi was the conductor of National Iranian Radio & Television Choir, known as "Hamâvazân". Shortly after the 1979 Iranian revolution she moved to the United States. In 1985 she founded the Ruhollah Khaleqi Orchestra in homage to her father and to preserve Persian music in the United States; however, the orchestra's activities was halted in 1990 due to financial difficulties.

== Personal life ==
She was married to American organist Stephen Ackert, with whom she had two sons—David and Julian.

Khaleghi died in Washington D.C. on 15 February 2021, at the age of 80.

== Works ==
=== Compositions ===
- "Azadi Anthem" (1979) for choir, with lyrics by Fereydoun Moshiri
- "Concerto for Santur and Orchestra" (1988)
- Piano works based on Persian folk music and melodies by Darvish-Khan, Morteza Neydavood, etc.

=== Arrangements ===
- "Pure Wine" (1991), arrangement of her father's works for voice, choir and orchestra.

=== Books ===
- "Ey Iran: Memorial volume of Ruhollah Khaleqi". Mahoor Institute, Tehran, 2006.
- "Ruhollah Khaleghi's Compositions & Arrangements". Mahoor Institute, Tehran, 2019.
