= Peyman Vahabzadeh =

Sociologist

- Vahbzadeh in a Toronto conference, 2010
- Born: 1961 (age 64–65); Tehran, Iran

Academic background
- Education: Simon Fraser University (PhD)
- Thesis: Articulated Experiences: Toward a Radical Phenomenology of Contemporary Social Movements (2000)
- Doctoral advisor: Ian Angus

Academic work
- Era: Contemporary Sociology
- Discipline: Sociology
- Institutions: University of Victoria

Peyman Vahabzadeh (Persian: پیمان وهاب‌زاده; born 1961 Tehran, Iran) is a professor of sociology at University of Victoria.

== Life and works ==
Vahabzadeh was born and raised in Iran and immigrated to Canada in 1989. He now considers coastal British Columbia his home.

He completed a BA in sociology and anthropology, followed by a PhD in sociology at Simon Fraser University in 2000. His dissertation, supervised by Ian Angus and supported by a SSHRC doctoral fellowship, received the SFU Dean of Graduate Studies Convocation Medal for Academic Excellence in the Faculty of Arts in 2001. From 2001 to 2003, he held a SSHRC-funded postdoctoral fellowship in the Department of Political Science at the University of Victoria, working under the guidance of Warren Magnusson. Vahabzadeh has taught courses in sociology, political science, CSPT, social justice studies, and the humanities at Simon Fraser University, the University of Victoria, and Brock University in Ontario.

=== Selected publications ===
- Vahabzadeh, Peyman (2010). A Guerrilla Odyssey: Modernization, Secularism, Democracy, and Fadai Period of National Liberation in Iran, 1971-1979. Syracuse University Press. JSTOR j.ctt1j5d726.
- Vahabzadeh, Peyman (2012-02-01), "Articulated Experiences: Toward a Radical Phenomenology of Contemporary Social Movements", Articulated Experiences, SUNY Press, doi:10.1515/9780791487402 (inactive 29 July 2025), ISBN 978-0-7914-8740-2
- Vahabzadeh, Peyman (2022-04-21), "The Art of Defiance: Dissident Culture and Militant Resistance in 1970s Iran", The Art of Defiance, Edinburgh University Press, doi:10.1515/9781474492249, ISBN 978-1-4744-9224-9

== Views on current events ==
Vahabzadeh has voiced opposition to the U.S. war against Iran, defending Iran’s right to sovereignty. In keeping with this position, he has also criticized members of the Iranian diaspora who have supported the war, claiming they align themselves with Western imperialist interests. Vahabzadeh signed a petition in March 2026 to stop the war against Iran.

In June 2026, Vahabzadeh signed a petition urging Canadian Prime Minister Mark Carney to take decisive action to end the genocide in Gaza.
