= Kharchakund =

Mountain in Uttarakhand, India

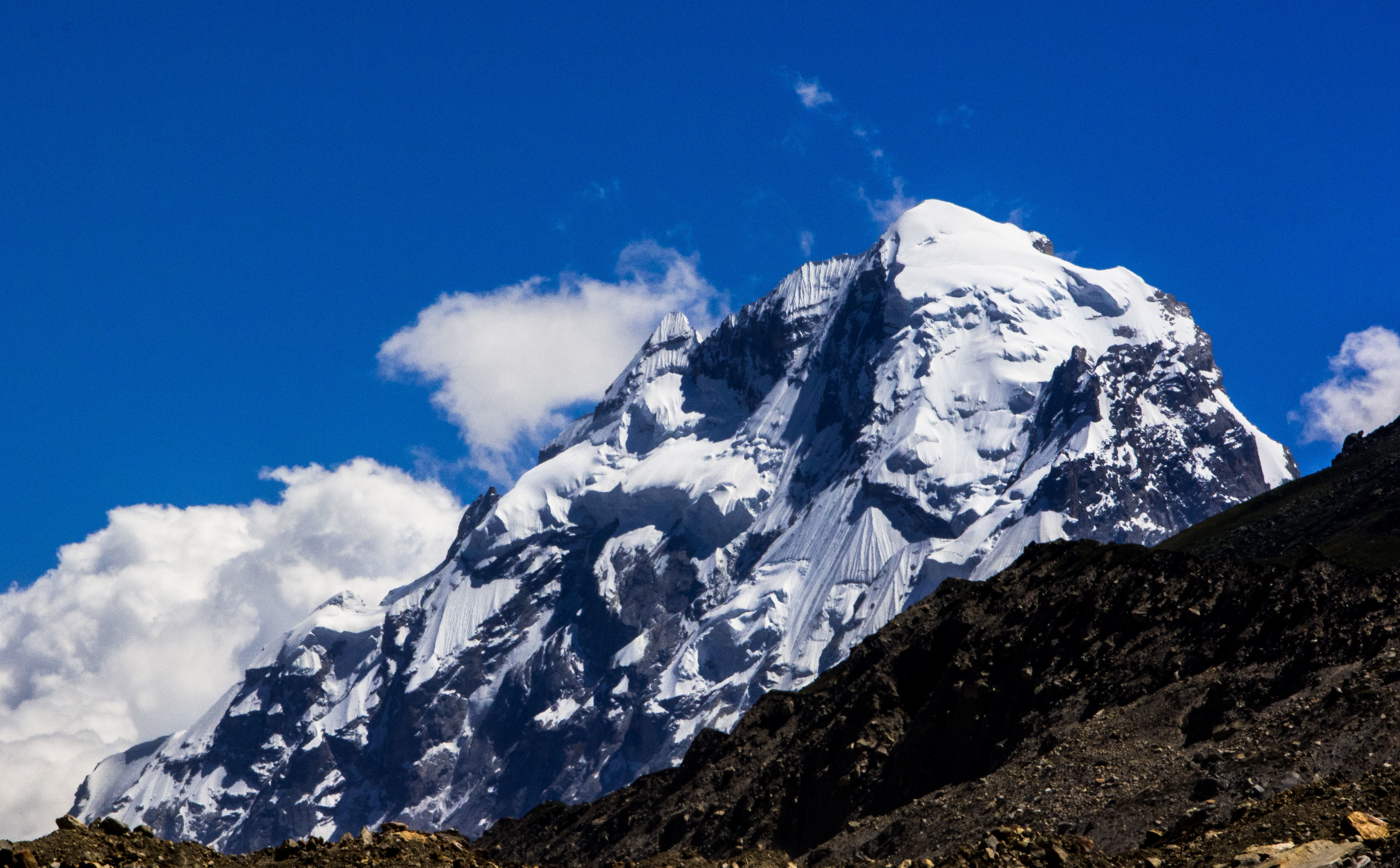
- Kharchakund from Tapoban

Highest point
- Elevation: 6,612 m (21,693 ft)
- Prominence: 835 m (2,740 ft)
- Coordinates: 30°46′50″N 79°07′44″E

Geography
- Location within Uttarakhand
- Location: Uttarakhand, India
- Parent range: Garhwal Himalaya

Climbing
- First ascent: A Japanese team climbed it in 1980

Kharchakund is a mountain of the Garhwal Himalaya in Uttarakhand, India. The elevation of Kharchakund is 6,612 metres (21,693 ft) and its prominence is 835 metres (2,740 ft). It is 64th highest located entirely within the Uttrakhand. Nanda Devi, is the highest mountain in this category. It is surrounded by Gangotri Glacier and Ghanoim Bamak. Its nearest higher neighbor Kedarnath Dome 6,831 metres (22,411 ft) lies 6.4 km WNW. It is located 1.2 km NNE of Sumeru Parbat 6,351 metres (20,837 ft) and 10.7 km east lies Janhukut 6,829 metres (22,405 ft).

== Climbing history ==
On 29 May 1980 a Japanese team climbed Kharchakund. The first summiteers of this mountain are Yoshitaka Tanimura and Toshiharu Hashimoto. They climbed Kharchakund from the west ridge a side ridge of the north ridge. On 30 May the second party also reached the summit they are Sueo Miyahara, Kaoru Ueno, Yoshiki Yamanaka and Masao Mizuno. They established three camps in between the summit. Camp 1 at a height of 4900m, camp 2 at 5300m and camp 3 at 6000m. A four-man team of the Oread Mountaineering Club, Robin Beadle, Bobby Gilbert, Rob Tresidder and Pete Scott climbed Kharchakund on 18 September 1987. They made an alpine-style ascent of Kharcha Kund's N ridge. They made six bivouacs between 5000m and 6000m before their summit day.

== Glaciers and rivers ==
Gangotri Glacier lies from the northern side to eastern side of Kharchakund. On the western side lies Ghanohim Bamak and on the south east lies Yeonbuk Bamak. Yeonbuk and Ghanoim both these glacier joins Gangotri glacier. From the snout of Gangotri Glacier comes out Bhagirathi River one of the main tributaries of river Ganga. which later joins Alaknanda river the other main tributaries of river Ganga at Dev Prayag and became Ganga there after.

== Neighboring peaks ==
neighboring peaks of Kharchakund:

- Chaukhamba I: 7,138 m (23,419 ft)30°44′59″N 79°17′28″E
- Bhagirathi I: 6,856 m (22,493 ft)30°51′00″N 79°08′57″E
- Kedarnath Peak: 6,940 m (22,769 ft)30°47′42″N 79°04′10″E
- Kedarnath Dome: 6,831 m (22,411 ft)30°48′31″N 79°04′44″E
- Sumeru Parbat: 6,350 m (20,833 ft)30°46′15″N 79°07′24″E
- Mandani Parbat: 6,193 m (20,318 ft)30°44′01″N 79°11′57″E
- Kirti Stambh: 6,270 m (20,571 ft)30°49′14″N 79°01′08″E

== See also ==
- List of Himalayan peaks of Uttarakhand
