= Ishkashim =

Ishkashim, also transliterated Eshkashem or Ishkoshim, may refer to:

- Ishkashim, Afghanistan, a town in Badakhshan Province
  - Ishkashim District in Badakhshan Province of Afghanistan
- Ishkoshim, Tajikistan, a town in Gorno-Badakshan Autonomous Province
  - Ishkoshim District in Gorno-Badakhshan Autonomous Province in Tajikistan
- Ishkashimi people
  - Ishkashimi language, spoken in Afghanistan and Tajikistan
- Ishkoshim Range, mountain range in Pamir Mountains in Tajikistan
