= Roshtqal'a District =

- District
- Russian: Рошткалинский район Tajik: Ноҳияи Роштқалъа
- Location of Roshtqal'a District in Tajikistan
- Coordinates: 37°12′N 71°55′E
- Country: Tajikistan
- Region: Gorno-Badakhshan Autonomous Region
- Established: 1992
- Capital: Roshtqal'a

Area
  - Total: 4,300 km^{2} (1,700 sq mi)

Population (2020)
  - Total: 27,400
  - Density: 6.4/km^{2} (17/sq mi)
- Time zone: UTC+5 (TJT)
- Postal code: 736112
- Area code: +992 3555
- Official languages: Russian (Interethnic); Tajik (State)
- Website: roshtkala.tj

Roshtqal'a District (Russian: Рошткалинский район, romanized: Roshtkalinskiy rayon, Tajik: Ноҳияи Роштқалъа, romanized: Nohiyai Roshtqal'a, also spelled Roshtkala from Russian transliteration) is a district in eastern Tajikistan, in the south-western part of the Gorno-Badakhshan Autonomous Region (GBAO). It stretches along the river Shakhdara between the Shughnon Range to the north and the Shakhdara Range to the south, enclosed within GBAO, without international borders. The population of Roshtqal'a district is 27,400 (January 2020 estim.). Its administrative capital is the village Roshtqal'a in the west part of the district, about 30 km south-east of the regional capital Khorugh.

The district coincides with the valley of the river Shakhdara. It is bounded on the north by Shughnon District, on the west and south by Ishkoshim District and on the east by Murghob District. Unlike the neighboring districts, it does not go all the way west to the river Panj.

Roshtqal'a town, the district capital, is about 30 km upstream from Khorog. The name means 'red fort'. The fort, built in the 9th-10th century (ruins only) was once the capital of Shugnan.

The river Shakhdara defines the district. Its valley is between the Shugnon Range in the north and the Shakhdara Range in the south. It flows into the Gunt above Khorog a few miles before that river flows into the Panj. Going upstream, it first goes southeast for about 40 km(straight line). At Bidiz there is a gorge and one of the few forests in Gorno-Badakhshan. The river turns east. At Sindev is the fort of the last Mingbashi or ruler of Shakhdara. The head of the river is the Jawshangoz plain where there were clashes between nomadic Kirghiz and settled Tajiks in the 18th and 19th centuries. There is a ruined fort from the 2nd or 3rd century and views of Karl Marx Peak to the south. A road of some sort goes north to the Koitezek Pass on the Pamir Highway with a branch west to Turumtaikul Lake and another route goes over the Maz pass to the Pamir River.

== Administrative divisions ==
The district has an area of about 4,300 km^{2} (2,000 sq mi) and is divided administratively into six jamoats. They are as follows:

Jamoat	Population (Jan. 2015)
Barvoz	3,301
Mirsaid Mirshakar	5,514
Roshtqal'a	2,838
Sizhd	3,447
Tavdem (K. Gadoliev)	7,689
Tusyon	2,491
