= Kirti Stambh (mountain) =

Mountain in Uttarakhand, India

- Location within Uttarakhand

Highest point
- Elevation: 6,270 m (20,570 ft)
- Prominence: 100 m (330 ft)
- Coordinates: 30°49′14″N 79°01′08″E

Geography
- Location: Uttarakhand, India
- Parent range: Garhwal Himalaya

Climbing
- First ascent: Ascent via NE face by Rick Allen on 20 October 1982.

Kirti Stambh is a mountain of the Garhwal Himalaya in Uttarakhand, India. The elevation of Kirti Stambh is 6,270 metres (20,571 ft) and its prominence is 100 metres (328 ft). It is 128th highest located entirely within the Uttrakhand. Nanda Devi, is the highest mountain in this category. It lies between Thalaysagar and Bhartekunta. Its nearest higher neighbor Bhartekunta 6,578 metres (21,581 ft) lies 2.3 km SE. It is located 5.1 km SSE of Thalaysagar 6,904 metres (22,651 ft) and 12.8 km NEE lies Bhagirathi I 6,856 metres (22,493 ft).

== Climbing history ==
A Scottish team comprising Rick Allen, Ernie McGlashan, Malcolm McCullough, Beverley Hurwood, and Roy F. Lindsay, of the Scottish Mountaineering Club had the first Ascent of Kirti Stambh via NE face by Rick Allen on 20 October 1982. on their first attempt on 4 October, McGlashan and Allen found an easy route avoiding the major dangers. They reached a high point of 6000 m but just fell short of 270 m because of bad weather. A second attempt by Lindsay and McCullough on 7–8 October they bivouac at high point of 5425 m. Next day McCullough was suffering from altitude sickness and they had to came down to a lower altitude. While returning Lindsay was hit by an avalanche and both retreated to base camp.

On the third attempt, Allen successfully climbed Kirti Stambh solo. On the evening of 19 October he reached the couloir between P 6254 m and Kirti Stambh and Bivouac at the col. On 20 October after negotiating the bergschrund difficulties on the summit snowfield, he reached the summit of Kirti Stambh at 9.20 a.m.

== Glaciers and rivers ==
Kirti Stambh is positioned between glaciers. Kirti Bamak lies north east, and Bhartekunta Bamak lies south west. Runoff from Kirti Bamak and the adjoining Gangotri Glacier form the main tributaries of the Ganges river, including the Bhagirathi River which later joins the Alaknanda River at Dev Prayag. On the other side, runoff from Bhartekunta Bamak forms the Bhilangana River, later joining the Bhagirathi River near Tehri Dam.

== Neighboring peaks ==
Neighboring peaks of Kirti Stambh include:

- Chaukhamba I: 7,138 m (23,419 ft)30°44′59″N 79°17′28″E
- Bhagirathi I: 6,856 m (22,493 ft)30°51′00″N 79°08′57″E
- Kedarnath Peak: 6,940 m (22,769 ft)30°47′42″N 79°04′10″E
- Kedarnath Dome: 6,831 m (22,411 ft)30°48′31″N 79°04′44″E
- Sumeru Parbat: 6,350 m (20,833 ft)30°46′15″N 79°07′24″E
- Mandani Parbat: 6,193 m (20,318 ft)30°44′01″N 79°11′57″E

== See also ==
- List of mountain peaks of Uttarakhand
