= Bhartekunta =

Mountain in Uttarakhand, India

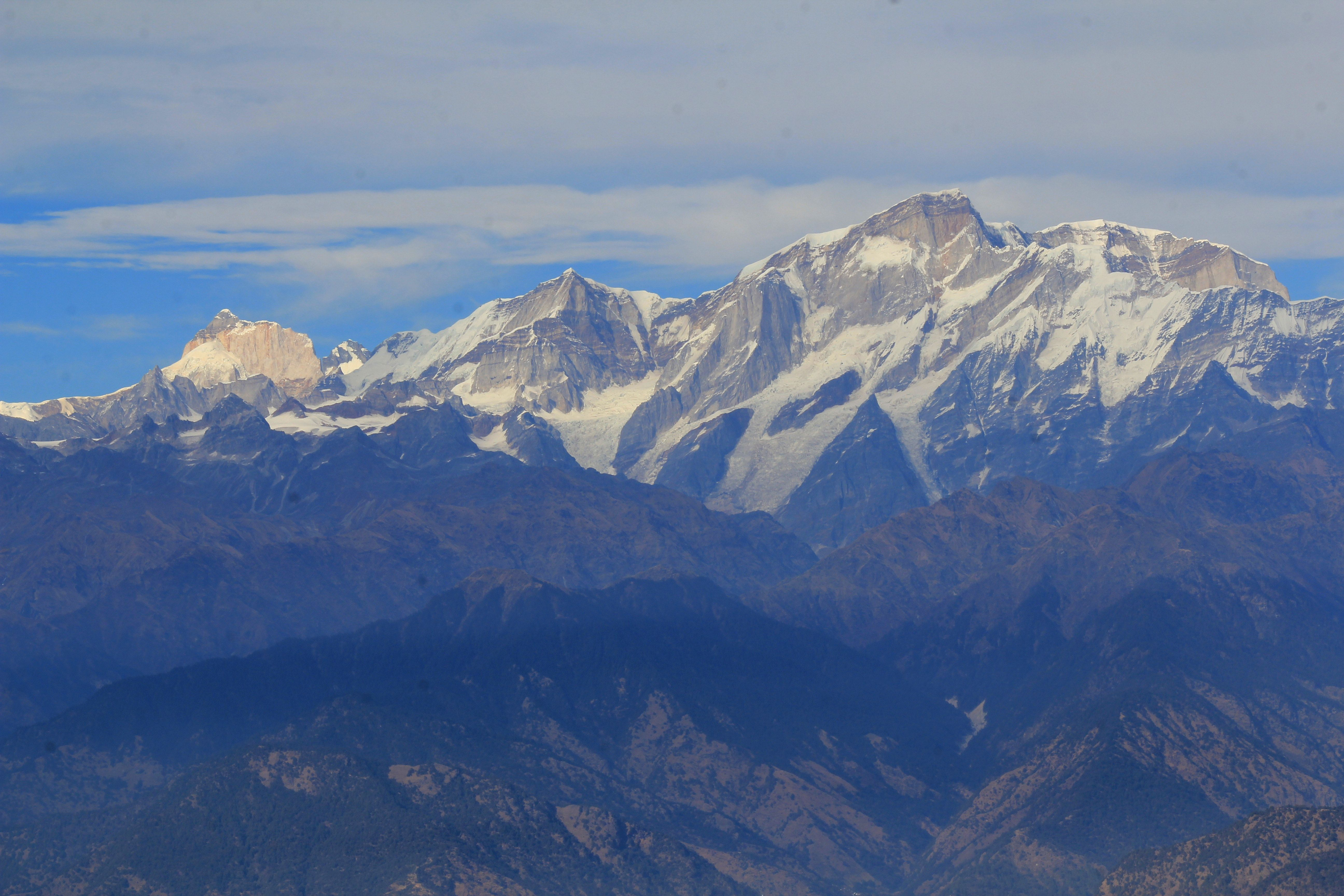
- Kedarnath, Bhartekunta and Thalay Sagar from Kartik Swamy temple. (R-L)

Highest point
- Elevation: 6,578 m (21,581 ft)
- Prominence: 280 m (920 ft)
- Listing: Mountains of Uttarakhand
- Coordinates: 30°50′39″N 79°02′05″E

Geography
- Location within Uttarakhand
- Location: Uttarakhand, India
- Parent range: Garhwal Himalaya

Climbing
- First ascent: Indo-Tibet Border Police claimed the first ascent of Bhartekunta led by B.C. Khulbey on 6 June 1975.

Bhartekunta is a mountain of the Garhwal Himalaya in Uttarakhand India.The elevation of Bhartekunta is 6,578 metres (21,581 ft) and its prominence is 280 metres (919 ft). It is 69th highest located entirely within the Uttrakhand. Nanda Devi, is the highest mountain in this category. It lies between Kirti Stambh and Kedarnath (mountain). Its nearest higher neighbor Kedarnath (mountain) 6,940 metres (22,769 ft) lies 3 km ESE. It is located 2.3 km SE of Kirti Stambh 6,279 metres (20,600 ft) and 6.9 km north lies Meru Peak 6,660 metres (21,850 ft).

== Climbing history ==
INDO-TIBET BORDER POLICE (ITBP) claimed the first ascent of Bhartekunta led by B.C. Khulbey on 6 June 1975. A Spanish club de Esquí de La Molina, Girona, of Spain climbed Bhartekunta on 27 September; climbers were Toni Bou, Kiko Colo, Josep Ximenis and Joan Sala. Bhartekunta was attempted by An Indian team led by Romesh Bhattacharjee from the Gangotri Glacier. They reached a high point of 6450 metres.

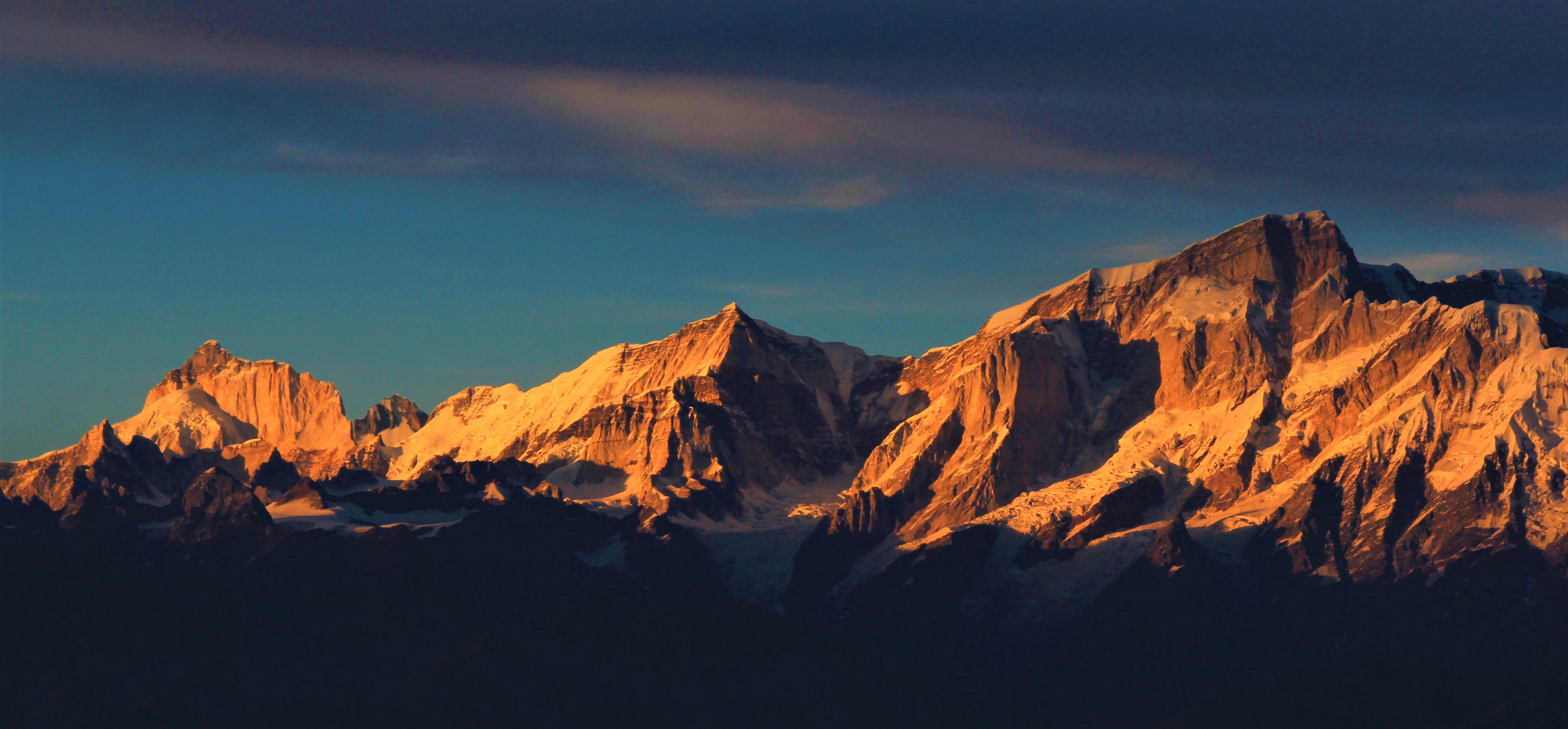
Kedarnath, Bhartekunta and Thalay Sagar at dusk from Kartik Swamy (R-L)

== Glaciers and rivers ==
Kirti Bamak lies on the NE side of Bhartekunta. On the SW side lies Bhartekunta Bamak. On the SE side lies Kedarnath Glacier. Kirti Bamak joins Gangotri glacier. Bhagirathi River comes out from the snout of Gangotri Glacier. Bhagirathi River is one of the main tributaries of river Ganga, which later joins Alaknanda river the other main tributaries of river Ganga at Dev Prayag and became Ganga there after. On the other side Bhartekunta Bamak drain down to Bhilangana River which later joins Bhagirathi River near Tehri Dam. Mandakini River emerges from Kedarnath glacier and joins Alaknanda River at Rudra Prayag.

== Neighboring peaks ==
neighboring peaks of Bhartekunta:

- Chaukhamba I: 7,138 m (23,419 ft)30°44′59″N 79°17′28″E
- Bhagirathi I: 6,856 m (22,493 ft)30°51′00″N 79°08′57″E
- Kedarnath Peak: 6,940 m (22,769 ft)30°47′42″N 79°04′10″E
- Kedarnath Dome: 6,831 m (22,411 ft)30°48′31″N 79°04′44″E
- Sumeru Parbat: 6,350 m (20,833 ft)30°46′15″N 79°07′24″E
- Mandani Parbat: 6,193 m (20,318 ft)30°44′01″N 79°11′57″E
