= Rick Allen (mountaineer) =

Scottish mountaineer (1954–2021)

Personal information
- Full name: Richard Frank Allen
- Nickname: Rick
- Nationality: Scotland
- Born: November 6, 1954 London, United Kingdom
- Died: July 25, 2021, age 67 K2
- Spouses: Alison Grigor (1988-1999 her death); Zukhra Zuptarova (2006-later divorced)
- Children: 2 stepchildren

Climbing career
- Major ascents: South Face of Pumori; Mazeno Ridge, Nanga Parbat

Richard Frank Allen (6 November 1954 – 25 July 2021) was a Scottish mountaineer. Allen summited six eight-thousanders and was the first British climber atop some of Tajikistan's biggest mountains. In 2013 he and Sandy Allan were awarded a Piolet d’Or for their traverse of Nanga Parbat's Mazeno Ridge. He had over 40 years' experience climbing in the Himalayas at the time of his death on K2.

== Biography ==
Allen was from Aberdeen. In his youth, his father took him climbing in the Scottish hills where he made ascents of Schiehallion and Ben Nevis. He began climbing with earnest while a chemical engineering student at the University of Birmingham in 1973. After university, Allen went to work in the oil and gas industry. During and after university, Allen became well known in Scotland for his first winter ascents across some of the region's most difficult routes. In 1984, he made the first winter ascent of Raven’s Edge (VII, 7) in Glen Coe.

=== High altitude climbing ===
Allen began climbing in the Himalayas in the early 1980s, making several first ascents in the region. Allen made several attempts at Mount Everest, reaching an expedition high point at 8170m in 1985. It was on this expedition to Everest that Allen first partnered with climbing partner Sandy Allan. The two would become close friends and longtime climbing partners.

In 1992, he made his first trip to Tajikistan where he made the first ascent of Tchimtarga (5482m) with Doug Scott and Sergei Efimov. In 1993, he joined an all-Russian team forging a new route up Dhaulagiri's north face. The ascent was successful and Allen learned Russian prior to the expedition.

After several attempts, Allen summited Mount Everest via the South East Ridge on May 26, 2000. He was the 960th person to summit Everest, summiting 15 years after his first attempt on the mountain.

In 2006, Allen moved to Tajikistan where he would make some of the first British ascents of the country's high peaks.

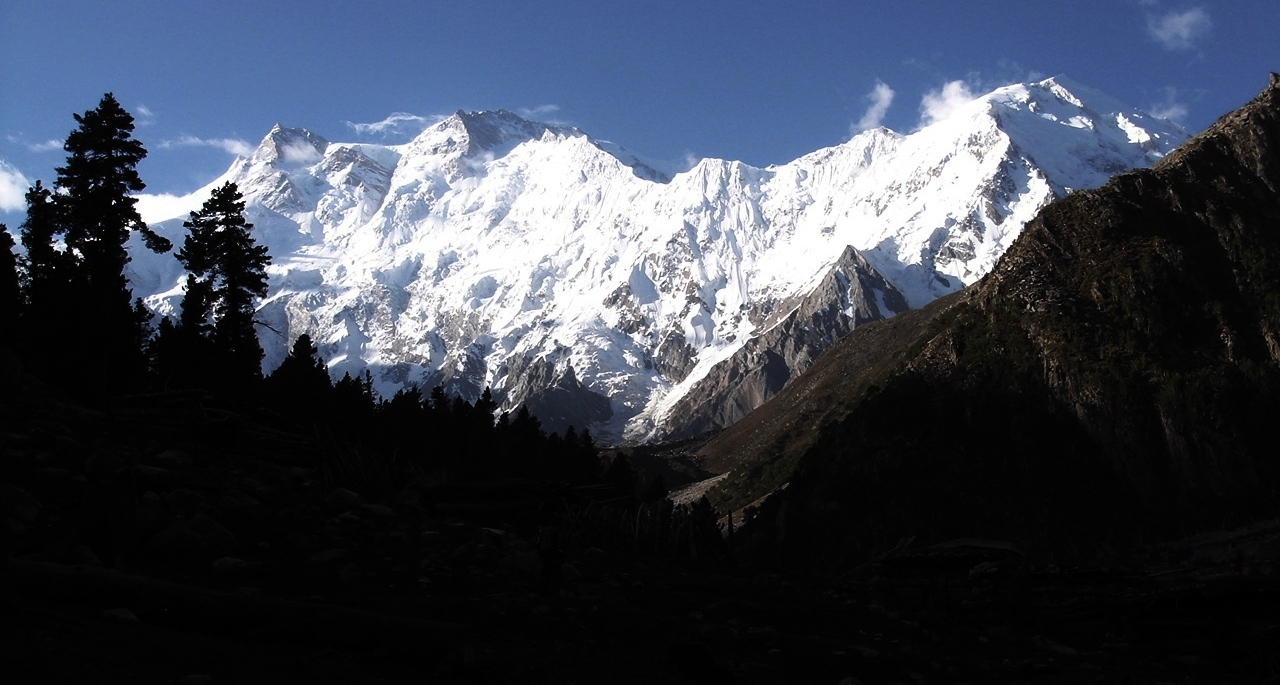
Nanga Parbat's Raikot Face and Mazeno Ridge, the site of Allen's most famous climb.

In 2013, he was awarded the Piolet d’Or for an epic 18-day traverse of Nanga Parbat's Mazeno Ridge alongside Sandy Allan. The 2012 climb was the first summit of the ridge, named the "last great unclimbed route in the Himalayas".

=== Broad Peak rescue ===
In 2018, Allen was presumed dead after falling from an ice cliff during a solo climb to the summit of Broad Peak. He was rescued when his rucksack was spotted by personnel at base camp. A drone operated by Bartek Bargiel, who was filming his brother Andrzej Bargiel's ski descent, located Allen on the mountain and helped guide rescuers to Allen's recovery. Allen had fallen over 100 feet (30 m) and had been exposed to the elements for 36 hours before he was rescued.

=== Final climb and legacy ===
Allen died in an avalanche on K2 as he attempted to take a new route to the summit in July 2021. At the time of his death, he was climbing to raise funds for the charity Partners UK. He was buried at the base of K2, in accordance with his family's wishes.

Allen was noted as a careful and safe climber. In 2024, the Alpine Club instituted the Rick Allen Skills Award in his honor.

== Notable climbs ==
- 1982 - First ascent, Kirti Stambh (6,271m)
- 1984 - First ascent, South Face of Ganesh II
- 1985 - First attempt of North-East Ridge of Everest (8,170m)
- 1986 - First ascent, establishing the "Scottish Route" on the South Face of Pumori with Sandy Allan
- 1988 - British expedition of the West Face of Makalu
- 1991 - First British ascent of Khan Tegri
- 1993 - First ascent, North Face of Dhaulagiri
- 1995 - Attempt to cross Nanga Parbat's Mazeno Ridge by bicycle
- 1996 - First ascent attempt of the East Face of K2 (made it up to 6,200m)
- 1997 - South Ridge of Broad Peak (7,200m)
- 2000 - Everest, successful summit
- 2006 - First British ascent of Karl Marx Peak, Tajikistan
- 2007 - First ascent, East Face and North Ridge of Pik Ovalnaya, Tajikistan
- 2009 - Diamir Face, Nanga Parbat
- 2011 - Hidden Peak, Gasherbrum I
- 2012 - First ascent of Mazeno Ridge, Nanga Parbat
- 2017 - Ascent of Tilicho, after aborted attempt on Northwest Face of Annapurna
- 2018 - Broad Peak, solo summit
- 2019 - K2 Abruzzi spur up to 8,300m, without oxygen

== See also ==
- List of deaths on eight-thousanders
- Mick Fowler, British multiple Piolet d'Or winner
- Paul Ramsden (climber), British multiple Piolet d'Or winner
