= Ishkoshim Range =

Mountain range in Pamir Mountains in Tajikistan

Ishkoshim Range Ишкашимский хребет
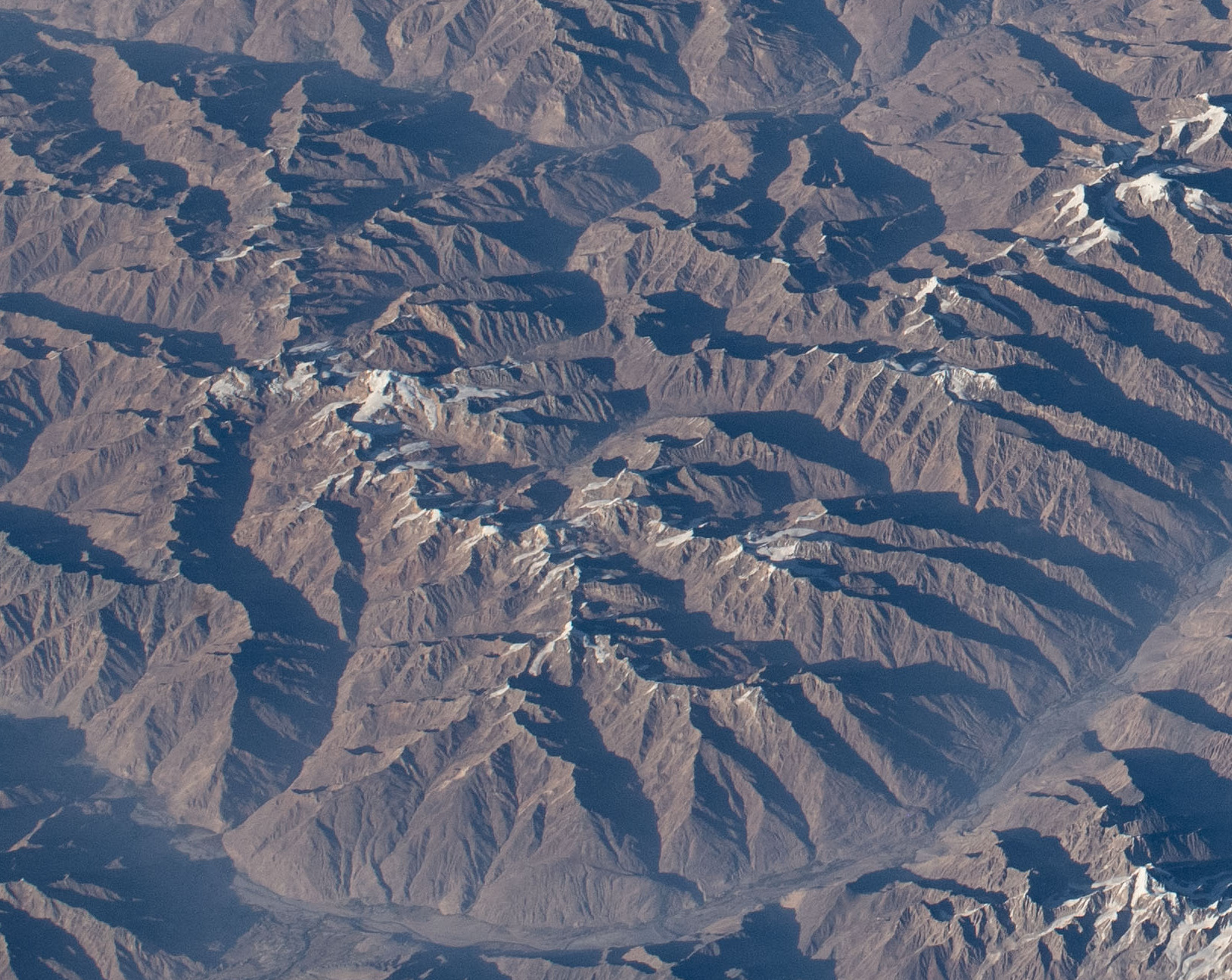

Highest point
- Peak: Mayakovsky Peak
- Elevation: 6,096 m (20,000 ft)
- Coordinates: 37°0′N 71°40′E

Geography
- Location within Tajikistan
- Country: Tajikistan
- Parent range: Pamir Mountains

Geology
- Rock age: Paleozoic
- Rock type(s): sedimentary and metamorphic rocks

Ishkoshim Range, also Ishkashim Range (Russian: Ишкашимский хребет), is a mountain range in Pamir Mountains in Tajikistan, in the extreme southwest corner of the Gorno-Badakhshan Autonomous Province (Ishkoshim District).

The range is about 90 km long, running along the right bank of the Panj River and the eastern border of Ishkoshim District with Roshtqal'a District. It contains the Ishkashim Important Bird Area. The mountains rise in the south to a maximum altitude of 6,096 m at Mayakovsky Peak, located at the junction of Ishkoshim Range with the east–west Shakhdara Range. There is an abundance of hot springs in these mountains, including the Gharm-Chashma thermal spa.
