= Ishkashim Important Bird Area =

Coordinates: 37°00′06″N 72°13′40″E

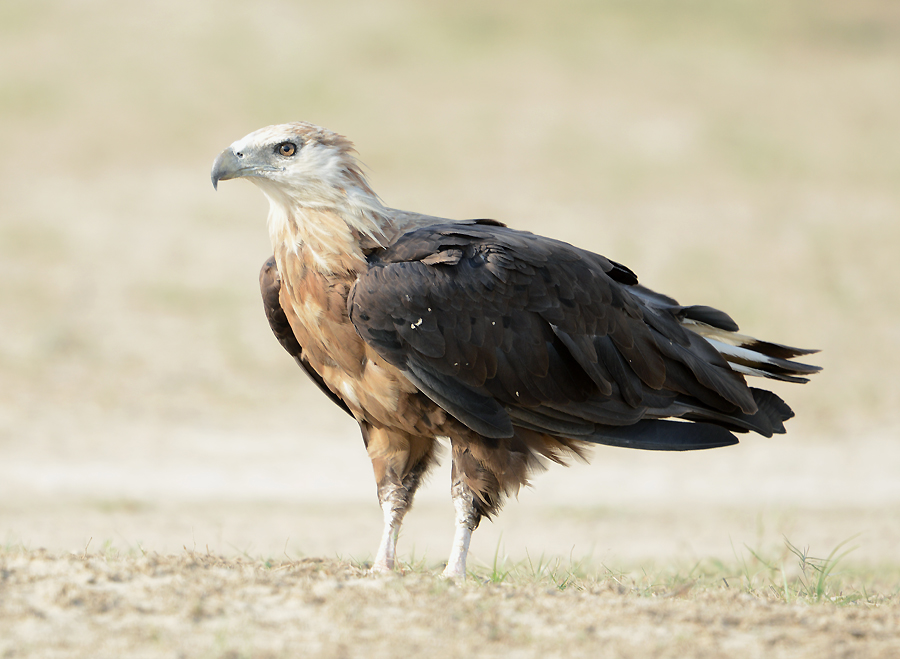
Pallas's fish eagles are passage migrants through the IBA.

The Ishkashim Important Bird Area (Chinese: 伊什卡希姆重点鸟区), also spelt Ishkoshim (Chinese: 伊什科希姆), is a 1136 km^{2} tract of land in south-western Gorno-Badakhshan Autonomous Province in eastern Tajikistan.

== Description ==
The site lies some 120 km south of the provincial capital of Khorugh, and 52 km from the district centre of Ishkashim, in the Shohdara Range of the southern Pamir Mountains. It encompasses a part of the southern slopes of the Shohdaras, the upper Vakhan valley, and the floodplain of the Panj River 10 km downstream from the confluence of the Pamir and Vahandara Rivers. There the Panj is braided, forming water meadows, pebbly shoals and sandy islands covered with tugay thickets.

== Birds ==
The site has been identified by BirdLife International as an Important Bird Area (IBA) because it supports significant numbers of the populations of various bird species, either as residents, or as breeding or passage migrants. These include Himalayan snowcocks, ferruginous ducks, saker falcons, Pallas's fish-eagles, cinereous vultures, ibisbills, European rollers, yellow-billed choughs, Hume's larks, wallcreepers, white-winged redstarts, white-winged snowfinches, rufous-streaked accentors, water pipits, fire-fronted serins, plain mountain finches and crimson-winged finches.
