= Engels Peak =

Mountain in Tajikistan

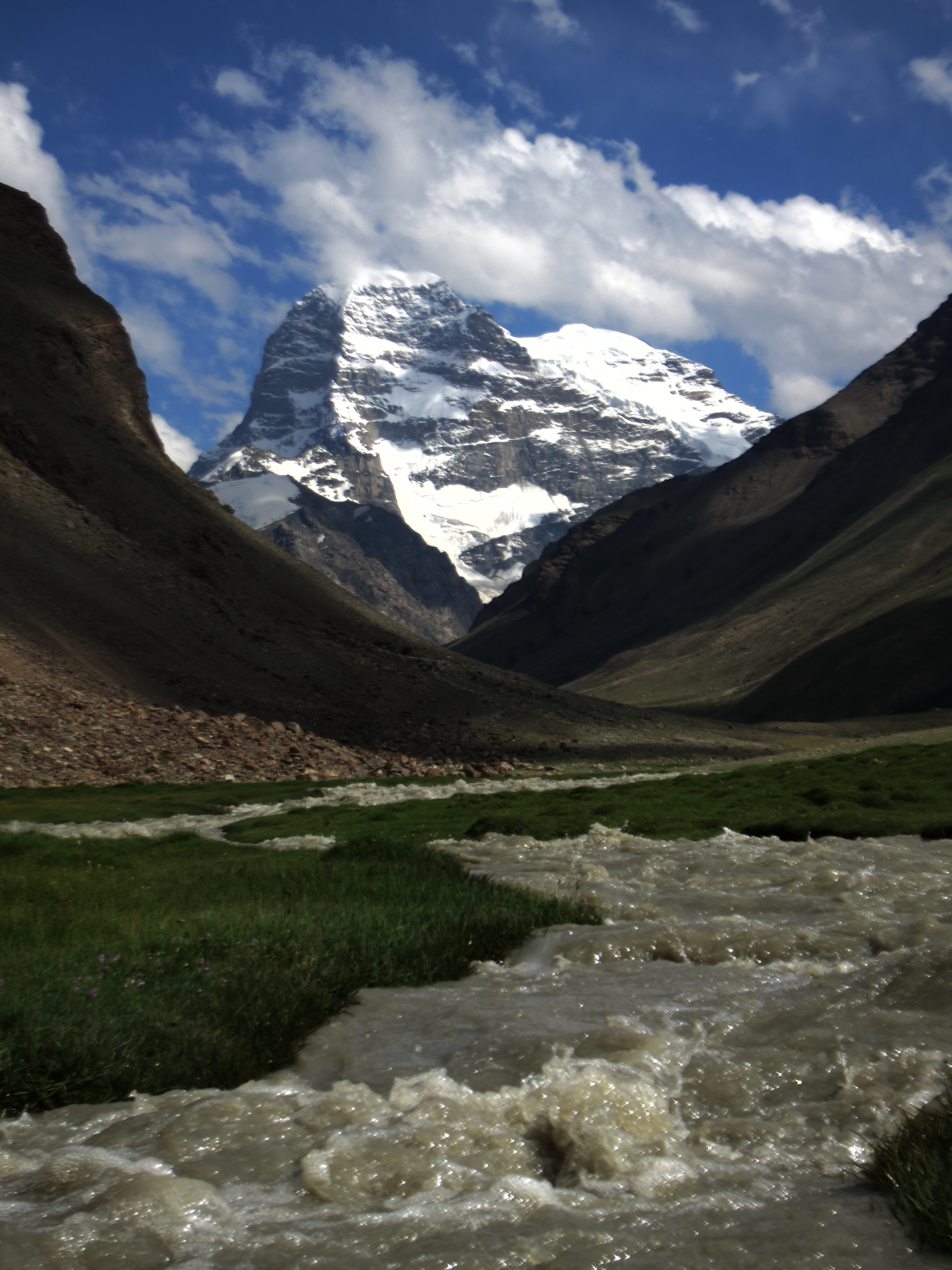
- Engels Peak as seen from the valley

Highest point
- Elevation: 6,510 m (21,360 ft)
- Listing: Ultra
- Coordinates: 37°10′18.02″N 72°31′22.43″E

Geography
- Location within Tajikistan
- Location: Tajikistan
- Parent range: Shakhdara Range

Engels Peak is a mountain in the Shakhdara Range of the South Western Pamir Mountain System in Tajikistan. The mountain is flanked by Glacier Naspar (5.1 km^{2}) in the north and Kishtidzharob Glacier (8.3 km^{2}) in the south.

== History ==
Engels Peak was originally known as the Queen's Peak, after Empress Maria Feodorovna. During the Soviet era, it was renamed Engels Peak, after the German philosopher Friedrich Engels who is set the foundations of socialism and communism together with Karl Marx. Karl Marx Peak is close to Engels peak. The first recorded ascent was in 1954 by a team of Georgian climbers led by Maxim Gvarliani.
