= Mayakovsky Peak =

Mountain in Tajikistan

- Пик Маяковского
- Location within Tajikistan

Highest point
- Elevation: 6,096 m (20,000 ft)
- Coordinates: 37°1′21″N 71°42′53″E

Geography
- Location: Ishkoshim District, Gorno-Badakhshan, Tajikistan
- Parent range: Ishkoshim Range (Pamirs)

Climbing
- First ascent: 1947 by Soviet alpinists led by V. Budenov
- Easiest route: rock / snow / ice climb

Mayakovsky Peak (Russian: Пик Маяковского) is a peak in Pamir Mountains.

It is located in the extreme south-west corner of Tajikistan's Gorno-Badakhshan Autonomous Province (Ishkoshim District), where the north–south Ishkoshim Range joins the east–west Shakhdara Range. Elevation 6,096 m. Discovered in the early 1930s by Soviet explorer Pavel Luknitsky, who gave it a figurative name, Three-Headed Peak. After the first ascent by Soviet alpinists in 1947, the peak was renamed in honor of the Soviet Russian poet Vladimir Mayakovsky (1893-1930). The 1947 Soviet expedition was led by V. Budenov.

== See also ==
- List of mountains of Tajikistan
