= Roshtqal'a =

Roshtqal'a Russian: Рошткала Tajik: Роштқалъа
- Location in Tajikistan
- Coordinates: 37°15′49″N 71°49′3″E
- Country: Tajikistan
- Region: Gorno-Badakhshan Autonomous Region
- District: Roshtqal'a

Population (2015)
  - Total: 2,838
  - Summer (DST): +5
- Climate: Dsb
- Official languages: Russian (Interethnic); Tajik (State)

Roshtqal'a (Russian: Рошткала; Tajik: Роштқалъа) is a village and jamoat in Gorno-Badakhshan Autonomous Region in south-east Tajikistan. It is the seat of Roshtqal'a District in Gorno-Badakhshan Autonomous Region in south-east Tajikistan. The jamoat has a total population of 2,838 (2015).
