= Vrang =

- Village and Jamoat
- Location in Tajikistan
- Coordinates: 37°00′N 72°22′E
- Country: Tajikistan
- Region: Gorno-Badakhshan Autonomous Region
- District: Ishkoshim District
- Elevation: 2,805 m (9,203 ft)

Population (2015)
  - Total: 6,541
- Time zone: UTC+5 (TJT)
- Postal code: 736503
- Official languages: Pamiri (Wakhi); Russian (Interethnic); Tajik (State)

Vrang (Russian and Tajik: Вранг) is a village and jamoat located in the Wakhan region of Tajikistan. It is located in Ishkoshim District in Gorno-Badakhshan Autonomous Region. The jamoat has a total population of 6,541 (2015).

== Religion ==
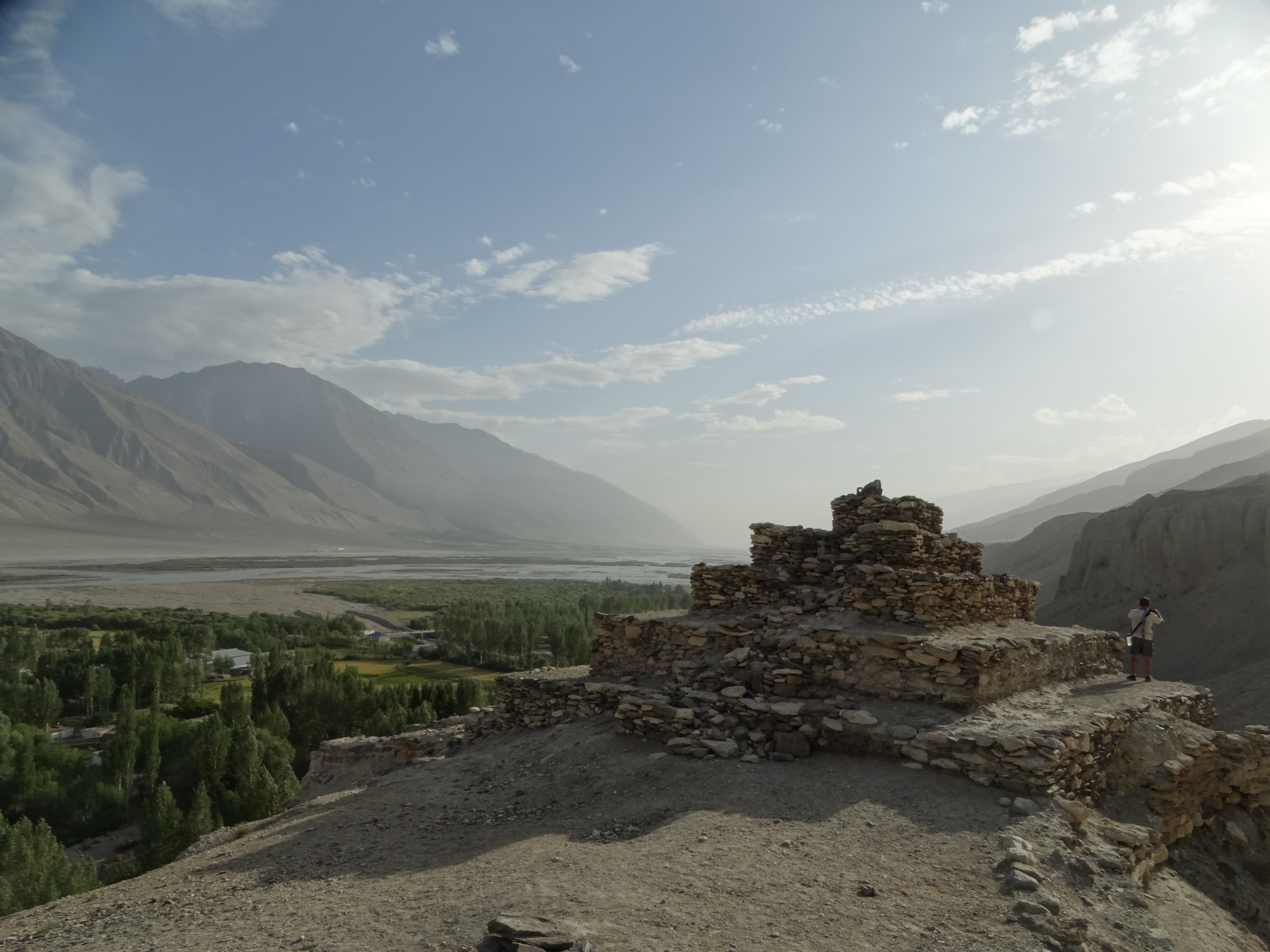
Remnants of a Stupa above the Panj valley

Vrang is home to a stupa of unknown origin, which may have originally been a Zoroastrian fire temple.
