= Pik Skalisty =

Mountain in Tajikistan

- Пик Скалистый
- Location within Tajikistan

Highest point
- Elevation: 5,704 m (18,714 ft)
- Coordinates: 37°36′N 72°13′E

Geography
- Location: Gorno-Badakhshan Autonomous Region, Tajikistan
- Parent range: Shughnon Range

Pik Skalisty (Russian: Пик Скалистый) is the highest peak in the Shughnon Range, Pamir.

It is located in the Gorno-Badakhshan Autonomous Province of Tajikistan.

== See also ==
- List of mountains of Tajikistan
