= Gharm-Chashma =

Hot spring in Tajikistan

Coordinates: 37°12.21′N 71°32.26′E

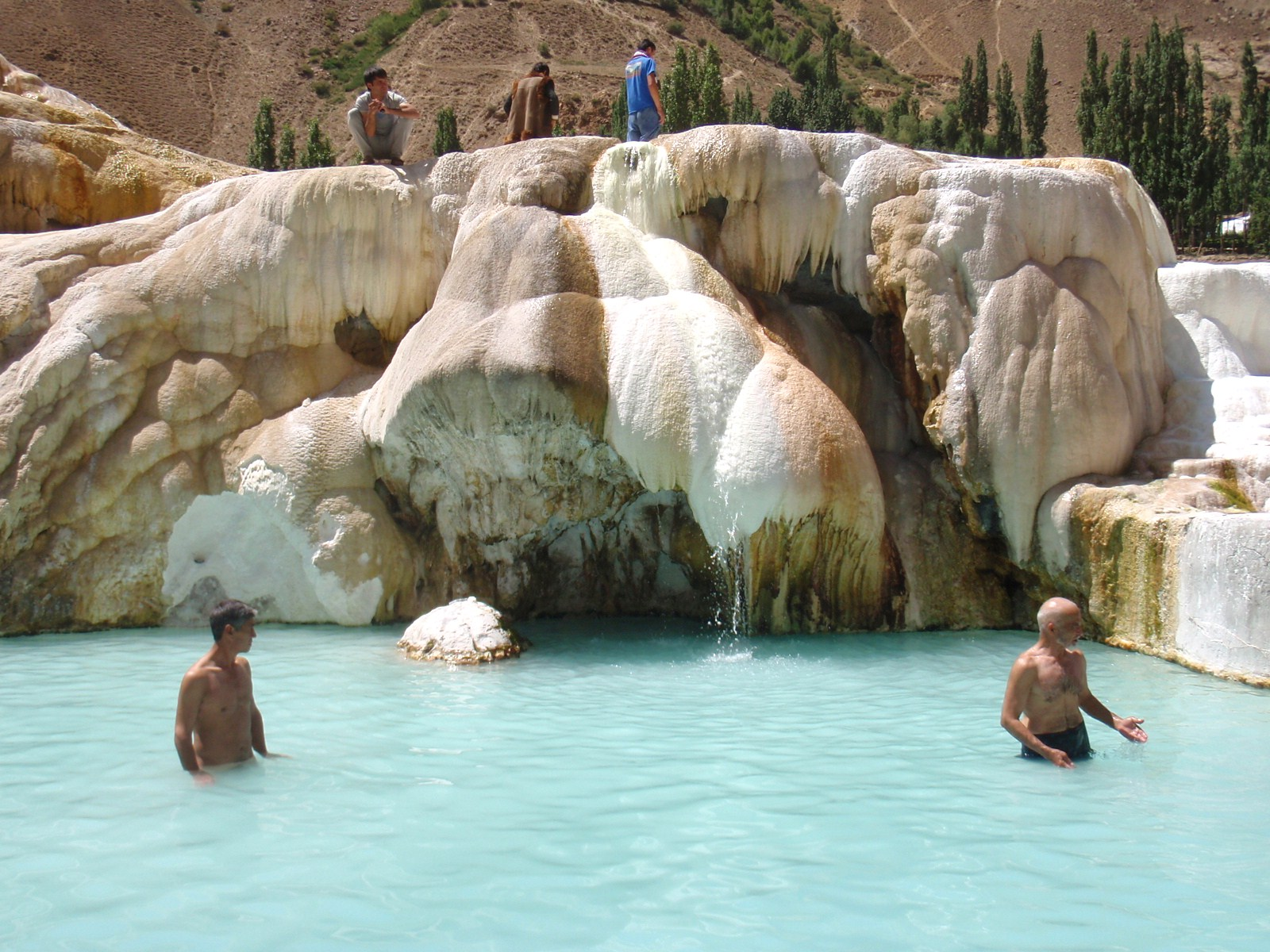
Gharm-Chashma hot springs

Garm-Chashma is a hot spring in the mountains of the Ishkoshim Range in Tajikistan's Gorno-Badakhshan Autonomous Province. The spring is located 40 kilometres from the provincial capital Khorugh, at an elevation of 2,325 metres (7,628 ft) above sea level.

The spring reaches temperatures as high as 50–75 °C, with water bubbling and gushing in micro-geysers to a height of 1 metre. The water is also murky and contains calcium balls from limy soils.
