= Mazeno Ridge =

Ridge in the Himalaya range of Asia

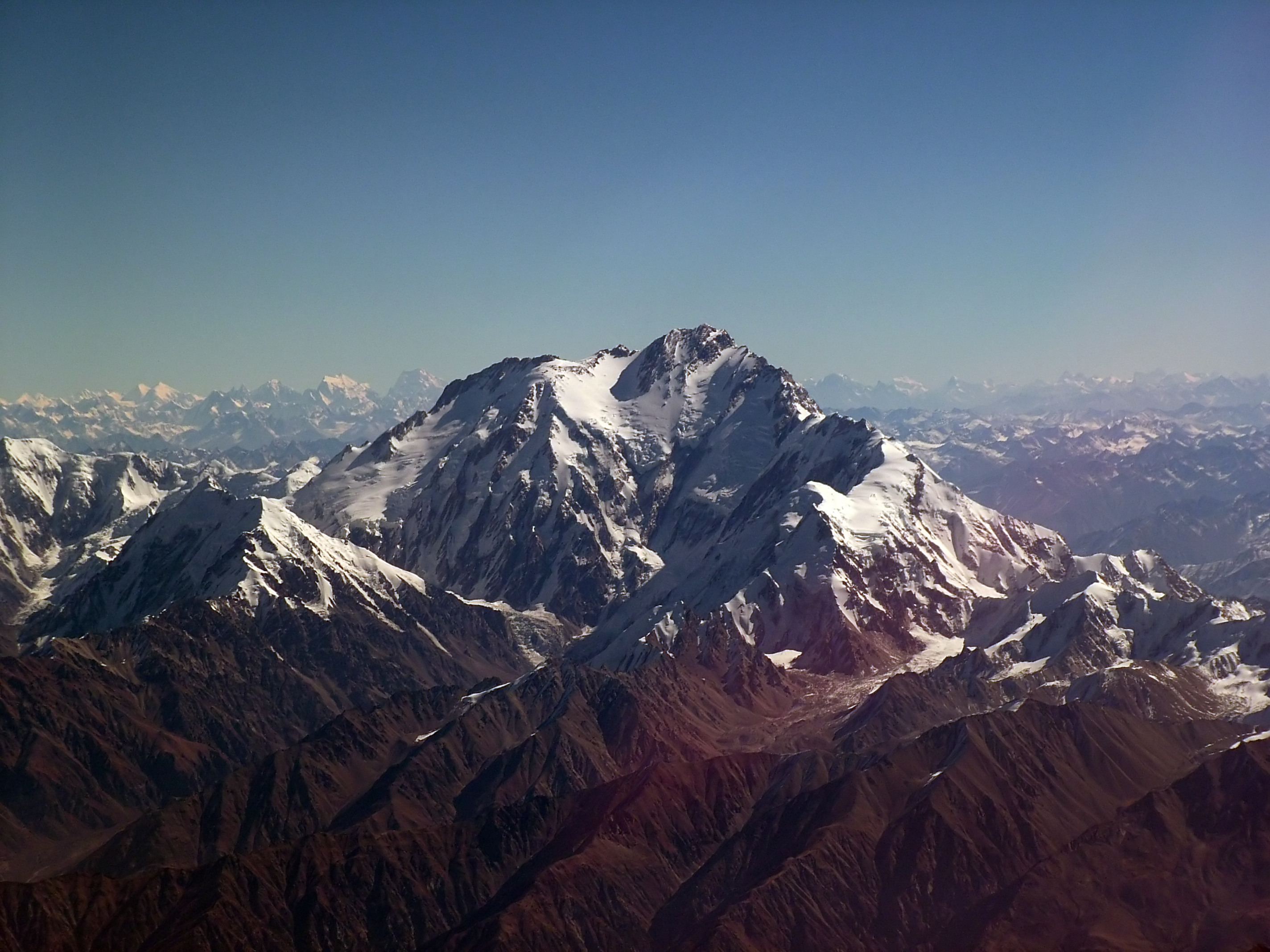
- Mazeno Ridge on the right of the Nanga Parbat massif

Highest point
- Elevation: 7,120 m (23,360 ft)
- Coordinates: 35°13′34″N 74°33′21″E

Geography
- Location within Gilgit Baltistan
- Location: Astore District, Gilgit–Baltistan, Pakistan
- Parent range: Himalaya

Climbing
- First ascent: 2004 by Doug Chabot and Steve Swenson (US)
- Easiest route: Western ridge route

The Mazeno Ridge is an arête, a long narrow ridge, and part of the Nanga Parbat massif in Gilgit–Baltistan, Pakistan, in the Himalayan range. The ridge is the longest of any ridge on the eight-thousander peaks in the Himalayas. A series of eight subsidiary peaks form the ridge, the highest being Mazeno Peak at 7,120 metres (23,360 ft). All eight subsidiary peaks have been climbed, but a complete traverse of the ridge and ascent of Nanga Parbat was only successfully achieved in 2012, and as of 2019, no other expedition has reached the summit of Nanga Parbat via the Mazeno Ridge.

Not far to the north is the western end of the Karakoram range. At the southern end of the ridge, the Mazeno mountain pass is 5,358 metres (17,579 ft) high and connects the towns of Astore and Chilas.

== Mazeno Ridge ==
The Mazeno Ridge forms part of the Nanga Parbat massif. With a length of 13 kilometres (8.1 mi) from Mazeno Pass to Mazeno Col, Mazeno is the longest ridge on any eight-thousander summit. It starts to the west of Nanga Parbat and heads north-east to the summit. The southwestern portion of this main ridge is known as the Mazeno Wall. The ridge has eight subsidiary peaks of over 6,800 metres (22,300 ft), the highest being Mazeno Peak with an elevation of 7,120 metres (23,360 ft). For a climber, there are no apparent escape routes on either flank until Mazeno Col is reached, where the ridge meets the Schell Route coming up the Rupal flank. A further 2 km (1.2 mi) climb ascends to the summit of Nanga Parbat.

== Climbing history ==
Mazeno Ridge was first attempted by a French mountaineering team led by Louis Audoubert in 1979 but bad weather prevented them from climbing any but the first Mazeno peak. The English mountaineer Doug Scott made three attempts at traversing the ridge, one being with Sandy Allen in 1992. The third attempt, in 1995, involved Rick Allen, Wojciech Kurtyka and Andrew Lock, while Scott was unwell, and was successful in climbing the first three of the Mazeno peaks.

The ridge was climbed in its entirety in 2004; a 10-kilometre (6.2 mi) traversal by US mountaineers Doug Chabot and Steve Swenson reached the Mazeno Col. However, they did not continue on to the summit of Nanga Parbat, as Swenson contracted a respiratory infection. They descended the mountain at the junction of the Schell Route.

In 2012, Scottish alpinists Sandy Allan, Rick Allen, and South African Cathy O'Dowd, along with three Sherpas Lhakpa Rangduk, Lhakpa Nuru and Lhakpa Zarok, traversed the ridge to Mazeno Col and set up a camp at 7,200 m (4.5 mi). A summit attempt the next day proved unsuccessful and O'Dowd and the three Sherpas decided to descend via the Diamir Face. After two more days, Allan and Allen successfully made their summit attempt on 15 July and descended by the Kinshofer Route to reach base camp on the 19th after an expedition lasting 18 days; they won a 2013 Piolet d'Or for their achievement.

In 2017, Argentine Mariano Galvan and Spaniard Alberto Zerain disappeared attempting the second ascent of the ridge. They are assumed to have been swept away by an avalanche, as a tracker worn by Zerain became stationary, 180 m (600 ft) below the ridge, until it ceased to function fifteen hours later. The tracker included an emergency distress signal, but that was not activated. A helicopter rescue mission deployed by the Pakistan military found avalanche debris at the last location of the tracker.
