= Shughnon Range =

Mountain range in the East of the Pamir Mountain System

- Location within Tajikistan

Highest point
- Peak: Pik Skalisty
- Elevation: 5,704 m (18,714 ft)

Dimensions
- Length: 80 km (50 mi) E/W
- Area: 150 km^{2} (58 mi^{2})

Naming
- Native name: Қаторкӯҳи Шуғнон (Tajik)

Geography
- Country: Tajikistan
- Range coordinates: 37°36′N 72°14′E
- Parent range: Pamir Mountains

Shughnon Range or Shugnan Range (Tajik: Қаторкӯҳи Шуғнон, romanized: Qatorkūhi Şuğnon) is a mountain range in Tajikistan, part of the Pamir Mountain System. Administratively it is located in Tajikistan's Region of Republican Subordination.

== Geography ==
The Shughnon Range stretches between the river valleys of the Gunt in the north and its tributary the Shakhdara in the south. Its slopes are covered in alpine meadows and steppe. There are glaciated areas in the range.

Its highest summit is 5,704 m high Pik Skalisty.

== See also ==
- List of mountains in Tajikistan
