= Kedarnath Glacier =

Glacier in Uttarakhand, India

Kedarnath
- Location within Uttarakhand Location within Tibet Location within India
- Interactive map of Kedarnath
- Type: Mountain glacier
- Location: Kumaon Himalayas, Uttarakhand, India
- Coordinates: 30°48′N 79°04′E

Kedarnath Glacier is located in Garhwal Himalaya mountain ranges, in the state of Uttarakhand, India.
