= Mandani Parbat =

Mountain in Uttarakhand, India

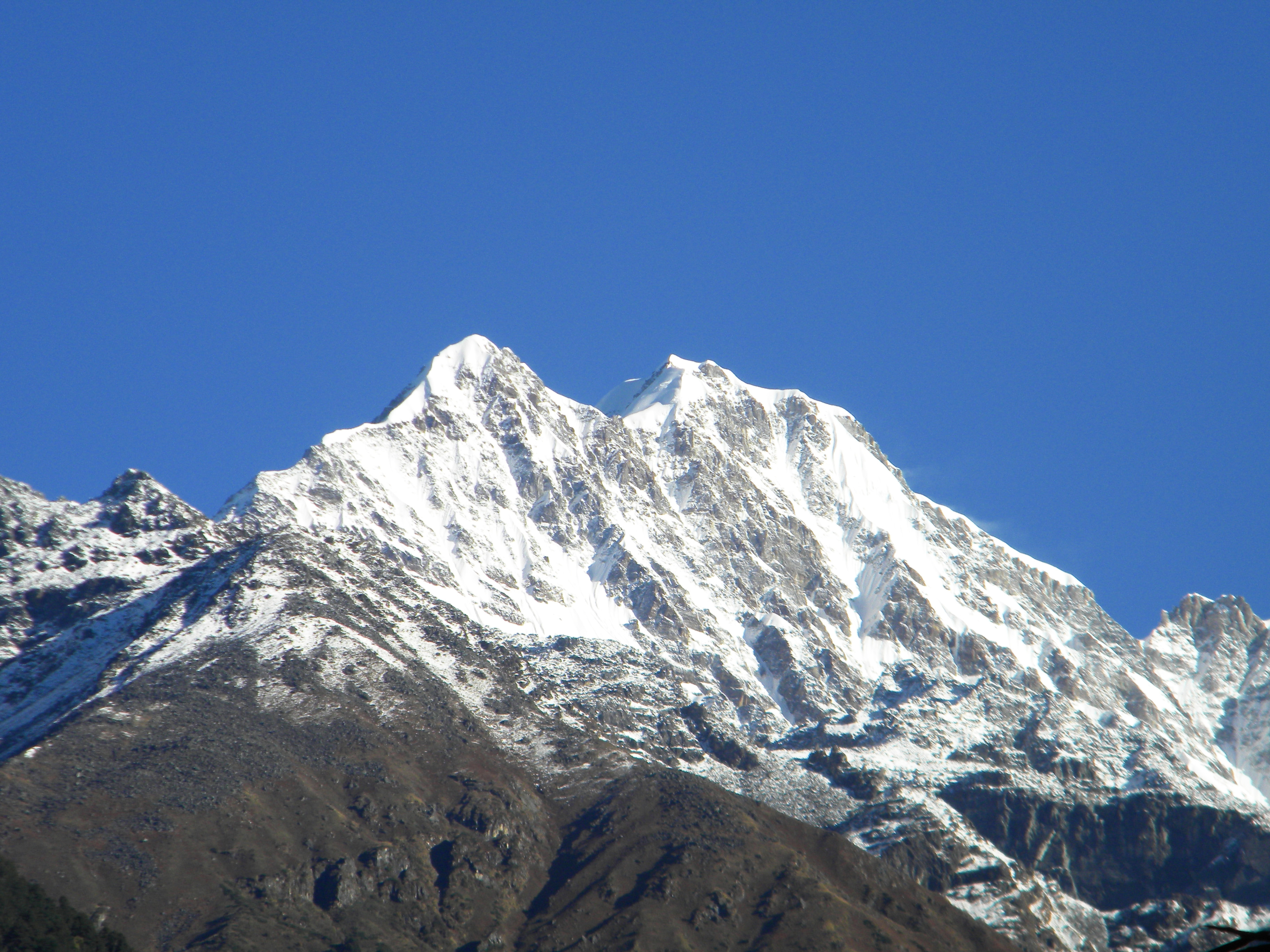

Highest point
- Elevation: 6,192 m (20,315 ft)
- Prominence: 532 m (1,745 ft)
- Coordinates: 30°44′01″N 79°11′57″E

Geography
- Location within Uttarakhand
- Location: Uttarakhand, India
- Parent range: Garhwal Himalaya

Climbing
- First ascent: Meszner and Spannraft climbed Mandani Parbat, on 20 September 1938.

Mandani Parbat is a mountain of the Garhwal Himalaya in Uttarakhand India.The elevation of Mandani Parbat is 6,193 metres (20,318 ft) and its prominence is 535 metres (1,755 ft). It is joint 140th highest located entirely within the Uttrakhand. Nanda Devi, is the highest mountain in this category. It lies between Chaukhamba IV, 6,854 metres (22,487 ft) and Sumeru Parbat, 6,351 metres (20,837 ft). Its nearest higher neighbor Chaukhamba IV lies 5.5 km east. It is located 8.4 km SE of Sumeru Parbat and 6.5 km NE lies Janhukut 6,829 metres (22,405 ft).

== Climbing history ==
In 1938, a German Expedition to the Gangotri Glacier had many first ascents of nearby peaks. On 20 September 1938, in a ten-hour climb from base camp, two climbers, Toni Meszner and Leo Spannraft, became the first to reach the summit of Mandani Parbat.

In 1973 a small team from Pune led by Dr G. R. Patwardhan climbed Mandani Parbat on 10 June 1973.

On 18 September 1994 a team from Bengal was stopped just 100m below the summit due to a huge crevasse.

== Glaciers and rivers ==
Gangotri Glacier lies on the northern side of Mandani Parbat from the snout of Gangotri Glacier comes out Bhagirathi River one of the main tributaries of river Ganga. On the south western side lies Mandani Glacier, from there comes out Mandani river after a short run it merges with Kali Ganga at Jalmalla near Kalimath which later joins Mandakini River below Naryankoti near Gupt Kashi later it joins Alaknanda River at Rudra Prayag which ultimately joins Bhagirathi River the other main tributaries of river Ganga at Dev Prayag and became Ganga there after.

== Neighboring peaks ==
neighboring peaks of Mandani Parbat:

- Satopanth, 7,075 m (23,212 ft)30°50′42″N 79°12′45″E
- Swachhand Peak, 6,721 m (22,051 ft)30°48′34″N 79°13′27″E
- Chaukhamba I, 7,138 m (23,419 ft)30°52′55″N 79°08′01″E
- Vasuki Parbat, 6,792 m (22,283 ft)30°52′30″N 79°10′30″E
- Bhagirathi Parbat III, 6,454 m (21,175 ft)30°52′09″N 79°08′01″E
- Kedarnath Peak, 6,940 m (22,769 ft)30°47′42″N 79°04′10″E
- Kedarnath Dome, 6,831 m (22,411 ft)30°48′31″N 79°04′44″E
- Sumeru Parbat, 6,350 m (20,833 ft)30°46′15″N 79°07′24″E

== See also ==
- List of Himalayan peaks of Uttarakhand
