= Shakhdara River =

River in Tajikistan

Shakhdara
- Pamir topographic map

Location
- Country: Tajikistan

Physical characteristics
- Source: Shakhdara Range (East)
  - coordinates: 37.240278°N 72.651667°E
- Mouth: Gunt River
  - location: Khorog
  - coordinates: 37.482778°N 71.591667°E
- Length: 142 km (88 mi)
- Basin size: 4,180 km^{2} (1,610 sq mi)

Basin features
- Progression: Gunt → Panj → Amu Darya → Aral Sea

The Shakhdara (Tajik: Шоҳдара, Russian: Шахдара) is a left tributary of the Gunt River in southeastern Tajikistan.

The Shakhdara has its source in the eastern part of the Shakhdara Range, not far from the Matz Pass and the Afghan border, in the extreme south of the Pamir Mountains . From there it flows in a westerly direction. It separates the Shakhdara range to the south from the Shughnon Range to the north. In its lower reaches, it turns north and meets the Gunt River east of Khorugh, a few kilometers before the Gunt flows into the Panj River, which is the Amu Darya source river.

It is fed by meltwater from glaciers and melting snow. Its length is 142 km. Its drainage basin covers 4180 km^{2}. The average discharge is 35.2 m^{3}/s. The water of the Shakhdara is used for irrigation.
