= Gunt =

River in Tajikistan

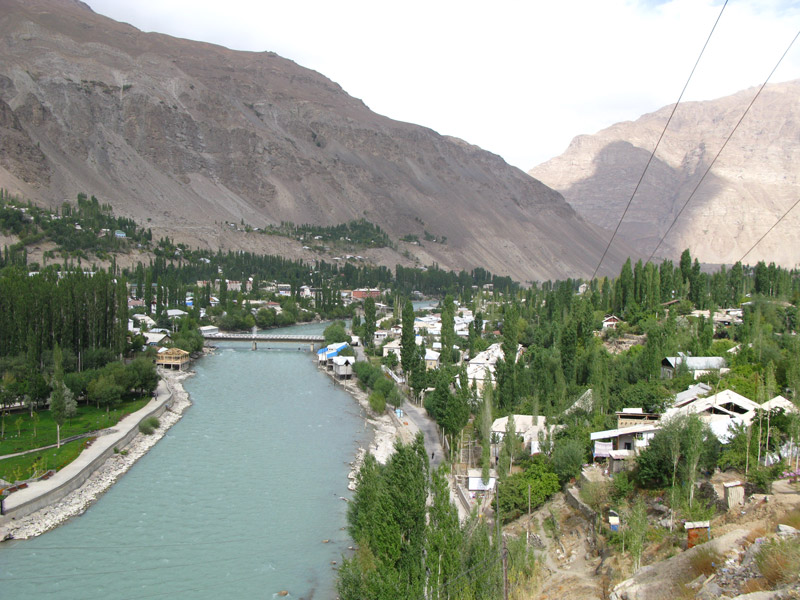
- Khorog and the river Gunt looking east

Location
- Country: Tajikistan

Physical characteristics
- Mouth: Panj
  - coordinates: 37.4898°N 71.5196°E
- Length: 296 km (184 mi)
- Basin size: 13,700 km^{2} (5,300 sq mi)

Basin features
- Progression: Panj→ Amu Darya→ Aral Sea

The Gunt (Russian: Гунт, Tajik: Ғунд Ghund or Аличур Alichur, historically in English also Ghund) is a river in the south of Tajikistan, north of the Shughnon Range. It is 296 kilometres (184 mi) long and has a basin area of 13,700 square kilometres (5,300 mi^{2}). Its source, Lake Yashilkul, is situated at the edge of the Alichur Pamir, a high plateau or pamir at an elevation of 3,720 m. The city of Khorog is located at the confluence of the Gunt with the Panj (one of the source rivers of the Amu Darya, forming the border between Tajikistan and Afghanistan). See Gorno-Badakhshan Autonomous Region for surrounding area.

The Gunt, and its tributary the Shakhdara, power the Pamir I power plant. The river flow is very seasonal, low in winter, but high in July and August due to water from melting snow. Its width varies from 10 to 50 meters and it is up to 1.5 meters deep. Due to the mountainous terrain, the rivercourse is very fast, over 2 m/s at times. Its bed is rocky, and the banks are steep and precipitous. Often the stream occupies the whole river valley, but sometimes it divides into several courses.
