= Janhukut =

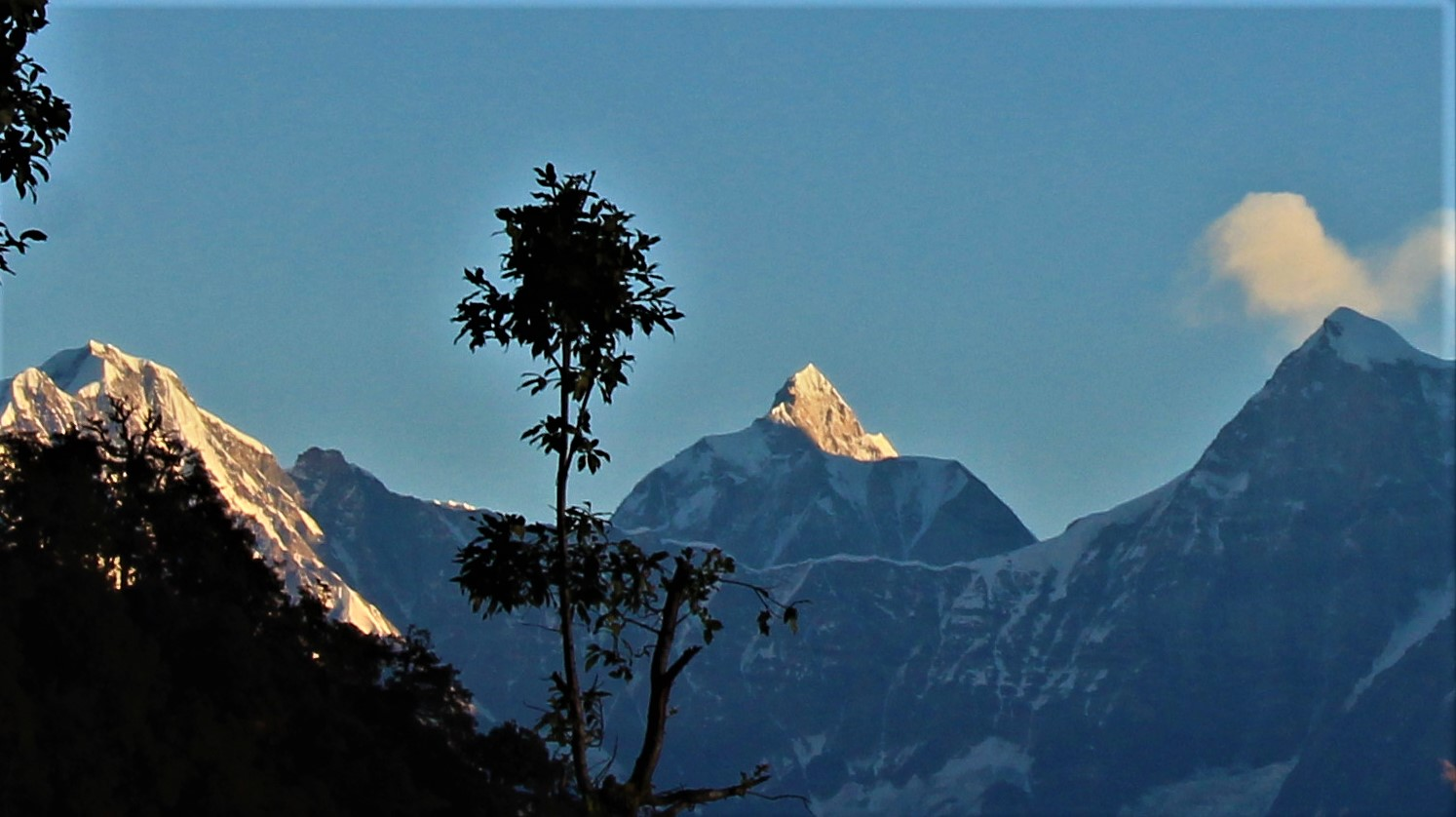
- Mandani Janhukut and Chaukhamba IV from (L-R)

Highest point
- Elevation: 6,805 m (22,326 ft)
- Prominence: 797 m (2,615 ft)
- Coordinates: 30°46′42″N 79°14′30″E

Geography
- Location within Uttarakhand
- Location: Uttarakhand, India
- Parent range: Garhwal Himalaya

Climbing
- First ascent: the first ascent British climbers Malcolm Bass, Paul Figg and Guy Buckingham on June 6, 2018.

Janhukut (Hindi: जन्हुकुट) is a mountain of Garhwal Himalaya in Uttarakhand India. Janhukut standing majestically at 6805 meter. It's the 31st highest located entirely within the uttrakhand India. Nanda Devi, is the highest mountain in this category. Janhukut is the 473rd highest peak in the world.

== Climbing history ==
The first ascent by a team of British mountaineers, Malcolm Bass, Paul Figg and Guy Buckingham made the summit on 6 June 2018 of the previously unclimbed peak via a route up its southwest buttress then southern ridge. It was first attempted by an Indian team in the 1980s and then an Austrian team in 2002. In 2004 Bass and Figg, who reached 6,000 meters on the southwest buttress The first significant progress made by any team along with teammate Andy Brown. On the same expedition, New Zealanders Pat Deavoll and Marty Beare climbed the main couloir on the peak's west face to reach 6,400 meters.

Prior to the June 6th 2018 summit, In 2014, Bass returned again with Simon Yearsley and climbed the southwest buttress, reaching the crest of the south ridge at 6,640 meters. Tey named this area "The Castle." Unfortunately, they were forced to abandon their bit to summit due to "strong, cold winds." Their attempt was the highest up to that date.

== Glaciers and rivers ==
On the eastern side of the Janhukut is Satopanth Bamak (Glacier) and on the west, Maiandi Bamak (Glacier). The southern end is flanked by Gangotri glacier and the northern by Bhagirathi Kharak glacier. From the Maiandi Bamak and Gangotri glaciers emerges Bhagirathi river and on the other side Satopanth Bamak and Bhagirathi kharak glacier, emerges Alaknanda river two main tributaries of Ganga. These two rivers meet at Devpryag, and from that confluence the two rivers form the headwater of the Ganga.

The entire surrounding area are protected within the 2,390 km^{2} (920 sq mi) Gangotri National Park, the largest conservation area in India. The Gangotri National Park is home to several world-class treks, including Gangotri Gomukh Tapoban, Kerdarnath Vasuki tal trek, Har ki dun valley trek and Badrinath to Satopanth tal trek.

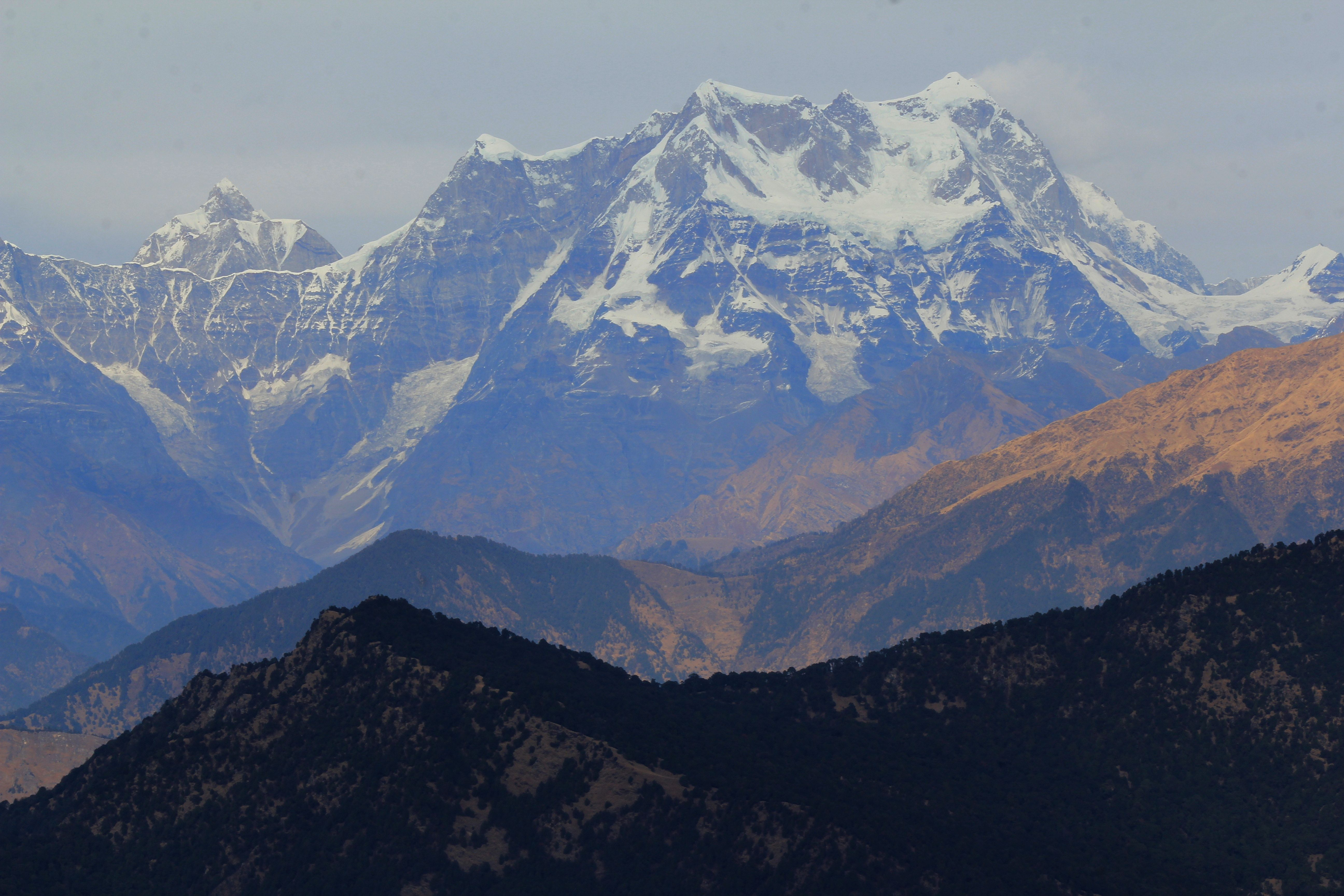
Janhukut and Chaukhamba from Kartick Swamy from (L-R)

== Neighboring peaks ==
neighboring peaks of Janhukut:

- Satopanth, 7,075 m (23,212 ft), 30°50′42″N 79°12′45″E
- Swachhand, 6,721 m (22051 ft)30°48′34″N 79°13′27″E
- Chaukhamba I, 7,138 m (23419 ft)30°52′55″N 79°08′01″E
- Mandani Parbat, 6,193 m (21175 ft)30°44′01″N 79°11′57″E

== See also ==
- List of Himalayan peaks of Uttarakhand
- Gangotri National Park
