= Sumeru Parbat =

Mountain in Uttarakhand, India

Highest point
- Elevation: 6,350 m (20,830 ft)
- Coordinates: 30°46′15″N 79°07′24″E

Geography
- Location: Uttarakhand, India
- Parent range: Garhwal Himalayas

Climbing
- First ascent: 1971 via North face
- Easiest route: glacier/snow climb

Sumeru Parbat is a 6,350-metre (20,830 ft) high mountain in the Gangotri Glacier region of Garhwal Himalaya, Uttarakhand, India. The mountain is encircled by Kedarnath and Kedardome in the north, Kharchakund in the west & Mandani and Yanbuk in the south.

== Climbing History ==
The first ascent was made in 1971 on the North face by an Indian expedition. The second ascent (first via NE face) was completed in 1984 by a team from Siliguri under the leadership of Durjoy Ghosh, which put four climbers and two Sherpas on the top in inclement weather conditions. A British team attempted an ascent of the south ridge in 1989, but turned back 400 feet (120 m) from the summit due to weather.
