= Ishkoshim, Tajikistan =

Ishkoshim Russian: Ишкашим Tajik: Ишкошим
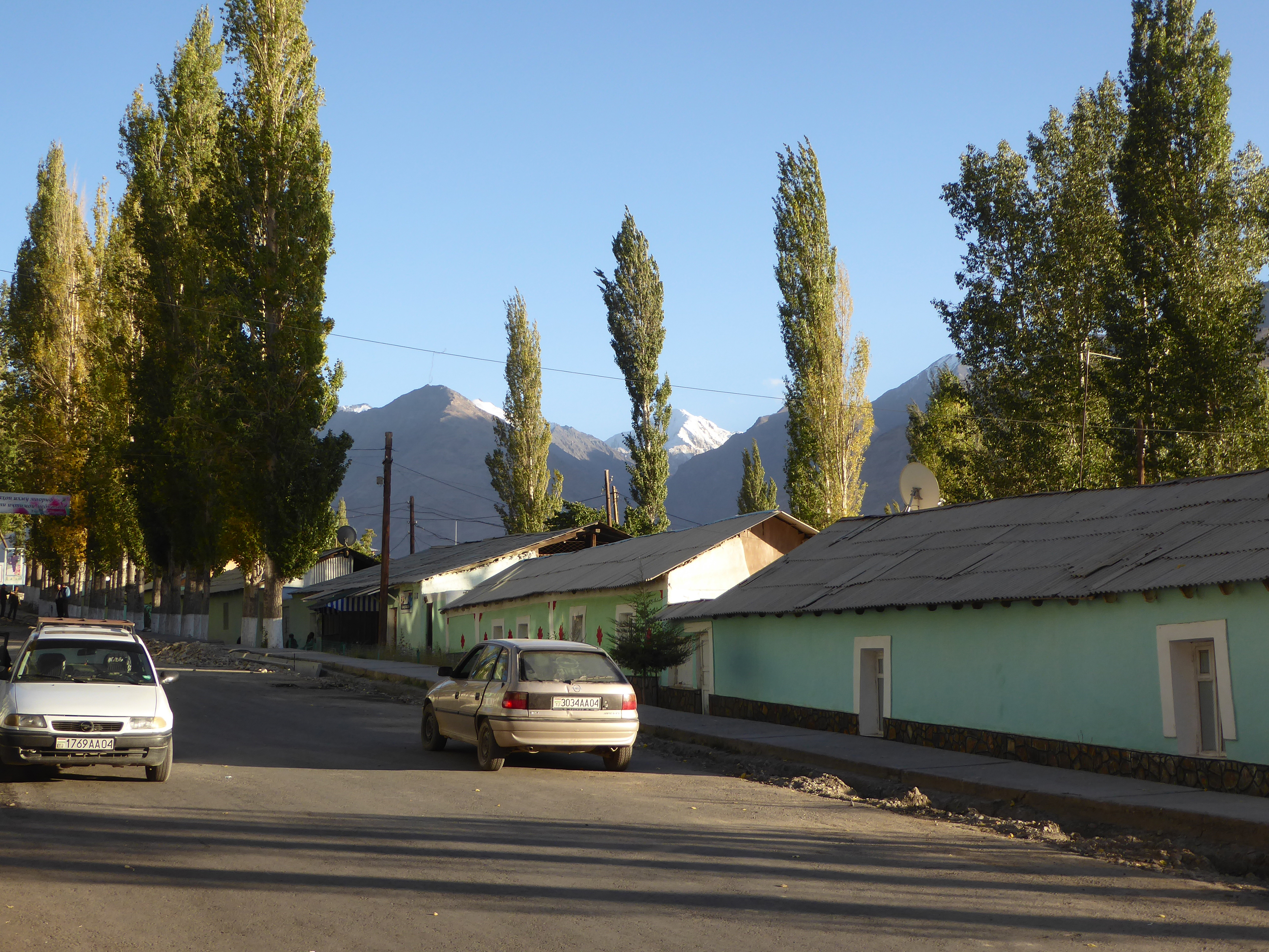

- Location in Tajikistan
- Coordinates: 36°43′38″N 71°36′42″E
- Country: Tajikistan
- Region: Gorno-Badakhshan Autonomous Region
- District: Ishkoshim

Population (2015)
  - Total: 7,673
- Climate: Dsb
- Official languages: Russian (Interethnic); Tajik (State)

Ishkoshim (Tajik: Ишкошим), also Ishkashim (Russian: Ишкашим), is a village and a jamoat in south-east Tajikistan. It is the seat of Ishkoshim District in Gorno-Badakhshan Autonomous Region. The jamoat has a total population of 7,673 (2015). It lies on the river Panj. Ishkoshim lies opposite a town of the same name in neighboring Badakhshan Province of Afghanistan, although the name of the Afghan town is normally transliterated Ishkashim. A bridge opened in 2006 links the two towns.

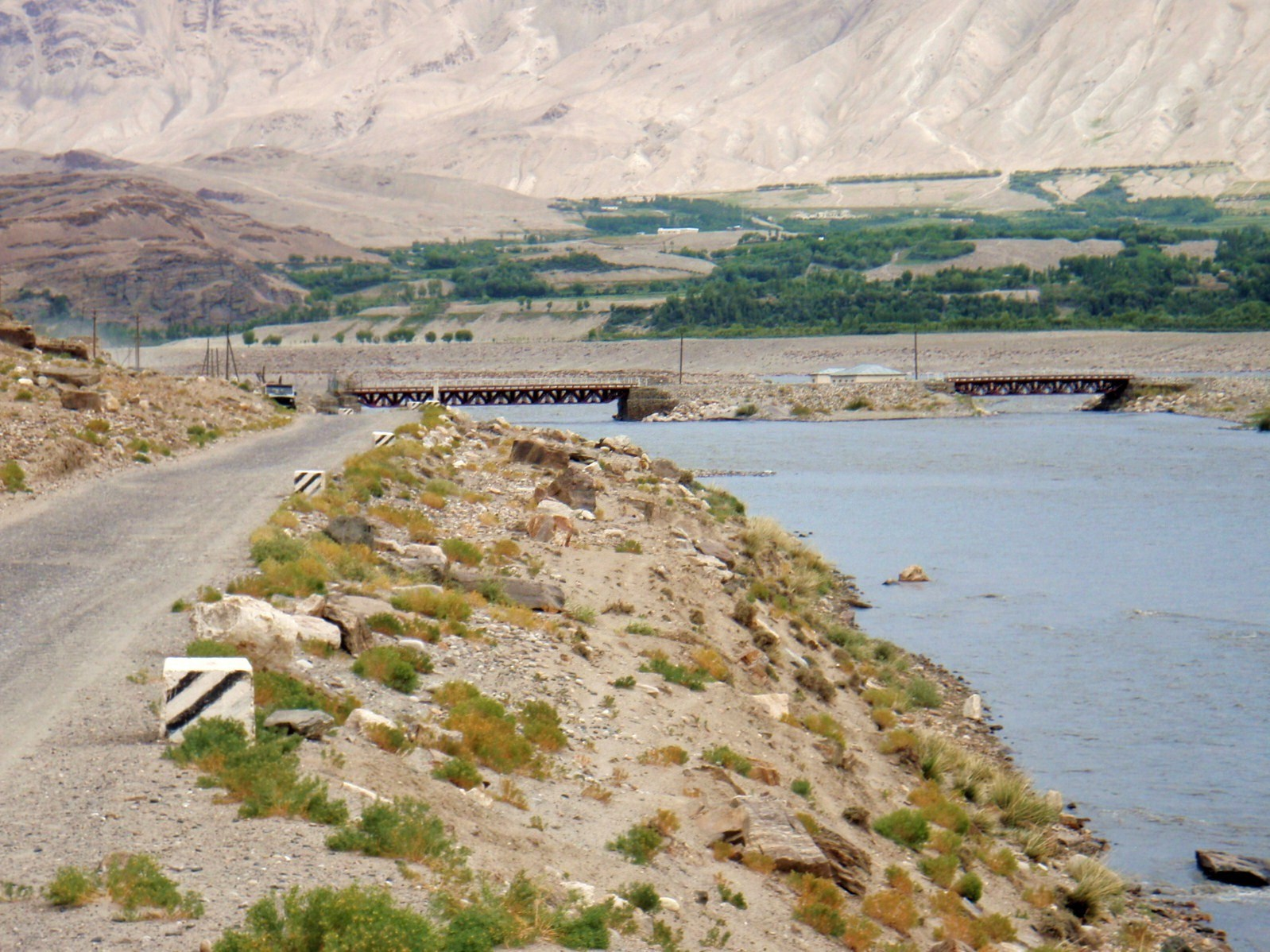
The Ishkoshim border bridge

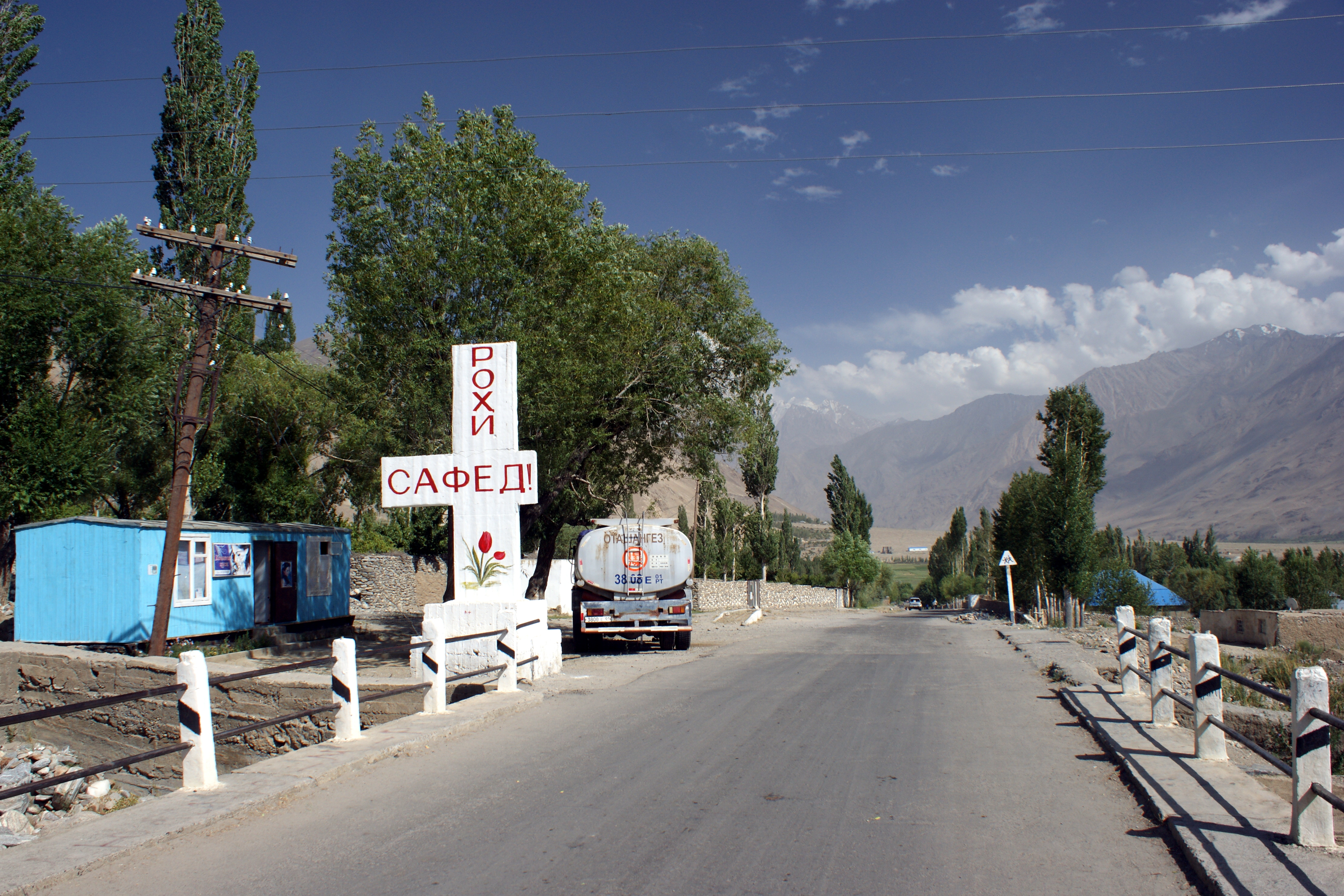
Near the bridge

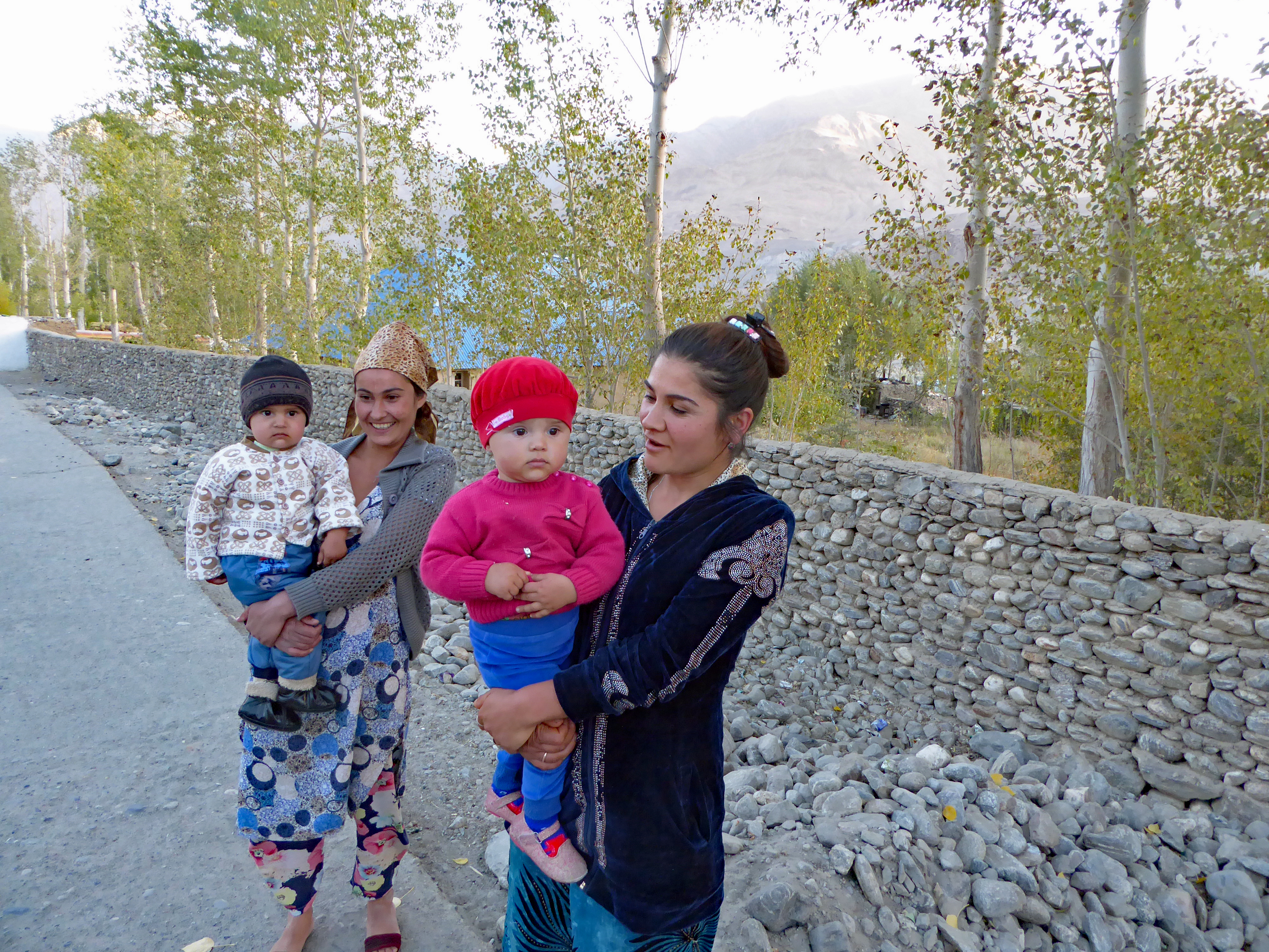
Locals in the town
