= Karl Marx Peak =

Mountain in Tajikistan

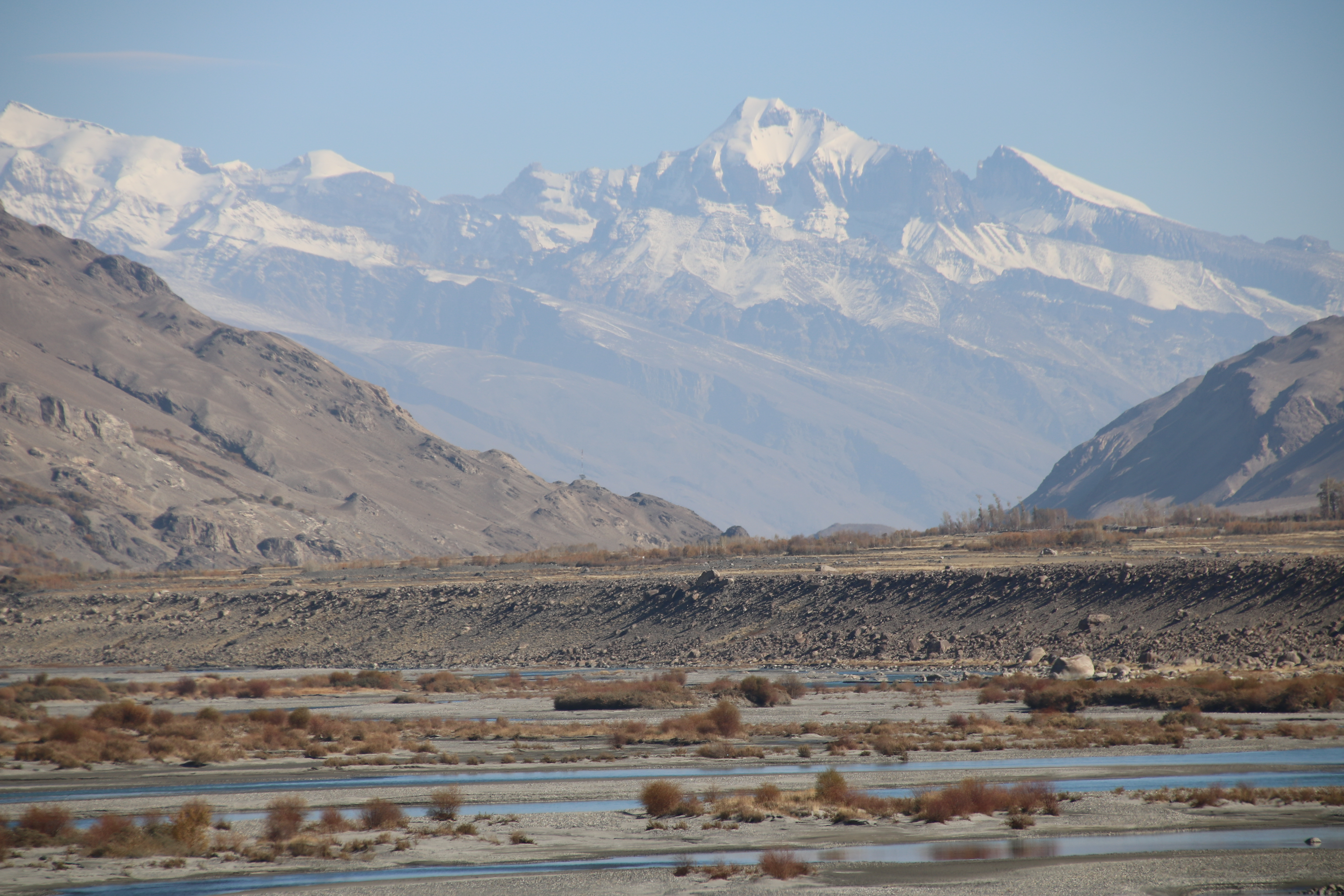

Highest point
- Elevation: 6,723 m (22,057 ft)
- Prominence: 2,693 m (8,835 ft)
- Listing: Ultra
- Coordinates: 37°09′45″N 72°28′54″E

Geography
- Location within Tajikistan
- Location: GBAO, Tajikistan
- Parent range: Shakhdara Range (Pamirs)

Climbing
- First ascent: 1946 by Evgeniy Beletskiy et al.

Karl Marx Peak (Russian: Пик Карла Маркса; Tajik: Қуллаи Карл Маркс) rises to 6,723 m (22,057 ft) in the Shakhdara Range in Pamir Mountains, in the south-west of Tajikistan's Gorno-Badakhshan Autonomous Province (eastern part of Ishkoshim district), just north of the Panj River and the Afghanistan border. It was named after the German philosopher Karl Marx whose theories were the basis of communism and socialism. The highest summit in the Shakhdara Range, it was discovered and named in 1937 by Soviet geologist and explorer of South-West Pamir Sergey Klunnikov. The ascent was delayed by the outbreak of World War II, and Karl Marx Peak was first climbed in 1946 by a group of Soviet alpinists led by Evgeniy Beletskiy.
