= Shakhdara Range =

Mountain range in GBAO, Tajikistan

Shakhdara Range Шахдаринский хребет
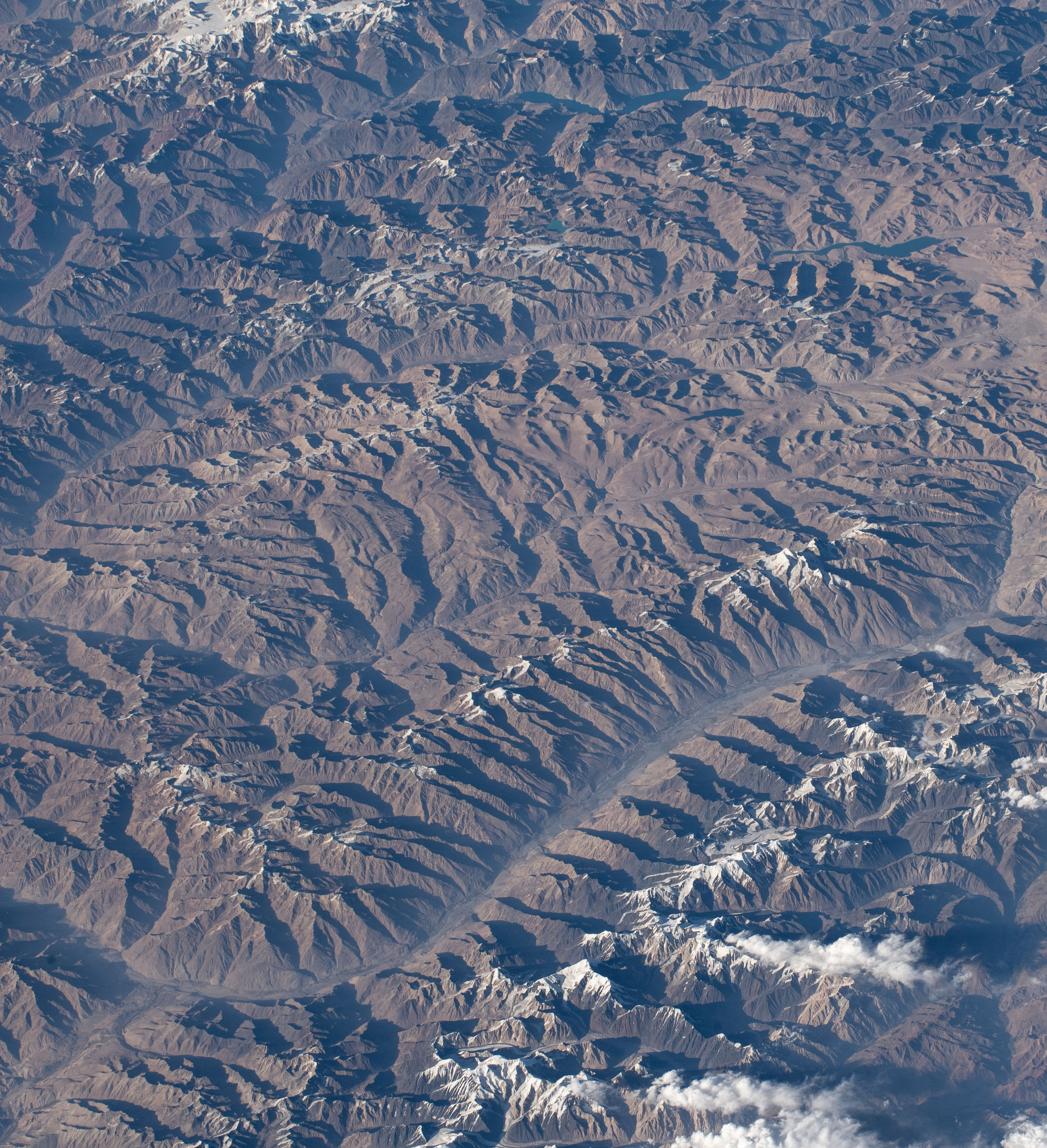
- Shakhdara Range, Pik Mayakowskiy, Karl Marx Peak, Panj Valley

Highest point
- Peak: Karl Marx Peak
- Elevation: 6,726 m (22,067 ft)
- Coordinates: 37°10′N 72°0′E

Geography
- Location within Tajikistan
- Country: Tajikistan
- Parent range: Pamir Mountains

Geology
- Rock age: Paleozoic
- Rock type(s): sedimentary and metamorphic rocks

Shakhdara Range (Russian: Шахдаринский хребет) is a mountain range in Tajikistan, part of the Pamir Mountain System.

The range lies in the extreme south-western Pamir in Tajikistan's Gorno-Badakhshan Autonomous Province. It runs roughly in the east–west direction between the Shakhdara River to the north with Darshaydara (Ishkoshim district), and Panj on the border with Afghanistan to the south, separating the watersheds of both rivers and rising toward Mayakovskiy Peak (6,096 m) in the west and Karl Marx Peak (6,726 m) in the east. Other high peaks of the range are Tajikistan Peak (6,565 m) and Engels Peak (6,510 m).

The range takes its name (in both English and Russian) from the Shakhdara River, and is sometimes erroneously called Shakhdarin Range (or Shakhdarin Mountains), a corruption of the Russian name.

== See also ==
- Roshtqal'a district
