= Ishkoshim District =

- District
- Russian: Ишкашимский район Tajik: Ноҳияи Ишкошим
- Location of Ishkoshim District in Tajikistan
- Coordinates: 36°45′N 71°40′E
- Country: Tajikistan
- Region: Gorno-Badakhshan Autonomous Region
- Established: 27 October 1932
- Capital: Ishkoshim

Area
  - Total: 3,656 km^{2} (1,412 sq mi)

Population (2020)
  - Total: 32,900
  - Density: 9.00/km^{2} (23.3/sq mi)
- Time zone: UTC+5 (TJT)
- Postal code: 736500
- Area code: +992 3553
- Official languages: Russian (Interethnic); Tajik (State)
- Website: ishkoshim.tj

Ishkoshim District or Nohiya-i Ishkoshim (Russian: Ишкашимский район, Tajik: Ноҳияи Ишкошим) is a district in eastern Tajikistan, in the extreme south-west of the Gorno-Badakhshan Autonomous Region (GBAO). It borders Afghanistan along the river Panj to the south and to the west. The population of Ishkoshim district is 32,900 (1 January 2020 estimate).

The district is roughly V-shaped and lies northeast of the Panj River where its course turns from west to north. It is bordered on the south and west Afghanistan across the Panj River and the lower Pamir River and on the north by Roshtqal'a District. There are short borders with Shughnon District to the north and Murghab District to the east. The Shakhdara Range is along the northern border with Roshtqal'a District and the north–south Ishkoshim Range is along the district's eastern border.

The district capital is Ishkoshim, a town at the bend of the Panj, opposite the Ishkashim District in Afghanistan. There is an ancient balas ruby (technically spinel) mine at Kuh-i-Lal. Ishkoshim District is a particularly attractive destination in Gorno-Badakhshan for its archaeological sites and spectacular scenery.

== Administrative divisions ==
The district has an area of about 3,700 km^{2} (1,000 sq mi) and is divided administratively into seven jamoats. They are as follows:

Jamoat	Population (Jan. 2015)
Ishkoshim (Rustambek Yusufbekov)	7,673
Ptup	
Qozideh	1,880
Shitkharv	2,223
Vrang	6,541
Askar Zamirov	2,770
Zong	6,355
