= Kedarnath (mountain) =

Pair of mountains in India

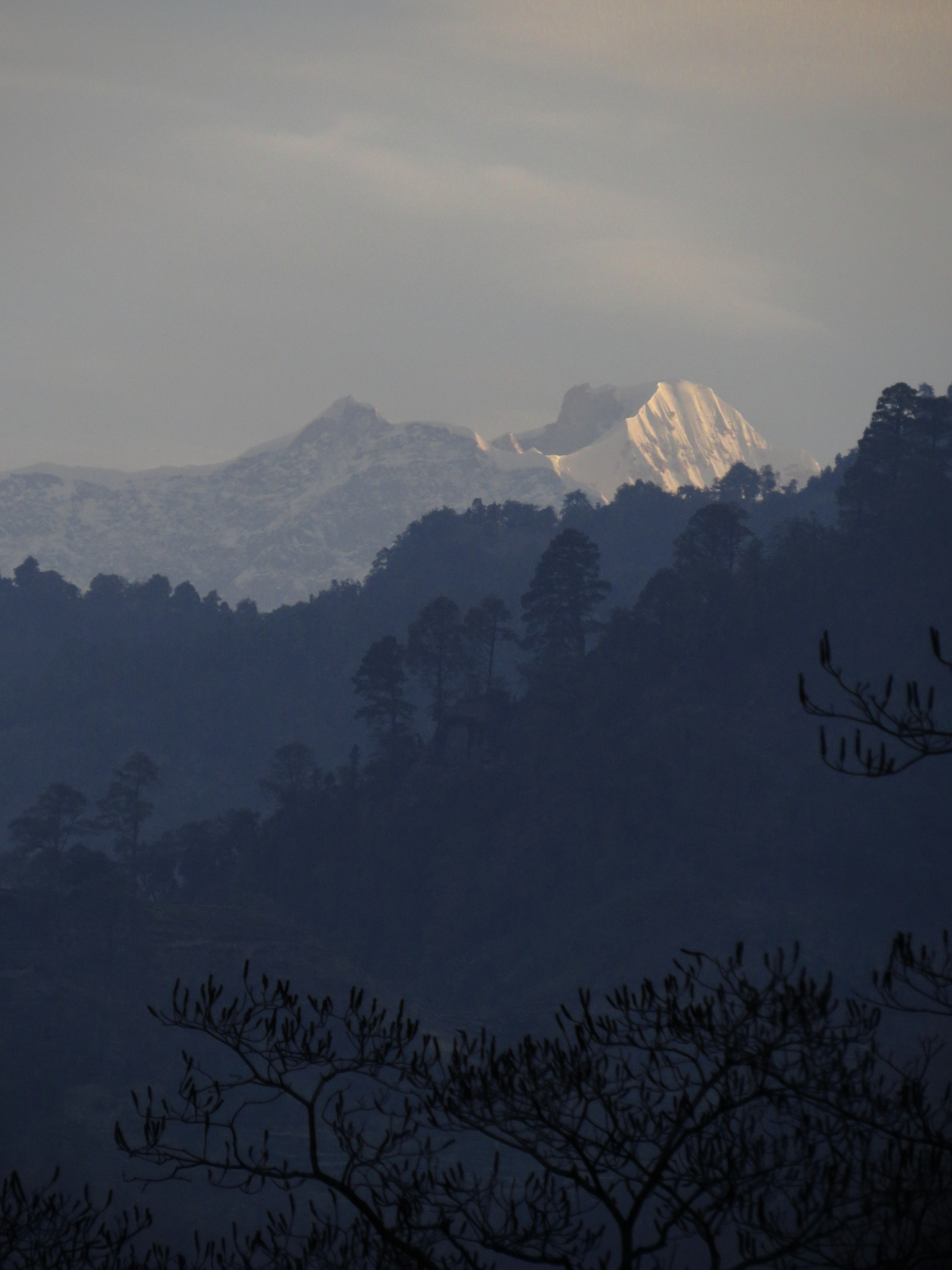
- The first rays of sunlight falling on Mt. Kedarnath.

Highest point
- Elevation: 6,940 m (22,770 ft)
- Prominence: 1,400 m (4,600 ft)
- Coordinates: 30°47′42″N 79°04′10″E

Geography
- Location: Uttarakhand, India
- Parent range: Gangotri Group, Garhwal Himalaya

Climbing
- First ascent: 1947 by André Roch et al.

Kedarnath (or Kedarnath Main) and Kedarnath Dome (or Kedar Dome) are two mountains in the Gangotri Group of peaks in the western Garhwal Himalaya in Uttarakhand state, India. Kedarnath (Main) lies on the main ridge that lies south of the Gangotri Glacier, and Kedarnath Dome, a subpeak of the main peak, lies on a spur projecting towards the glacier, two kilometres northwest of Kedarnath. They are at a distance 15 kilometres (9 mi) south of the Hindu holy site of Gaumukh (the source of the Ganges River). Kedarnath is the highest peak on the south side of the Gangotri Glacier, and Kedarnath Dome is the third highest.

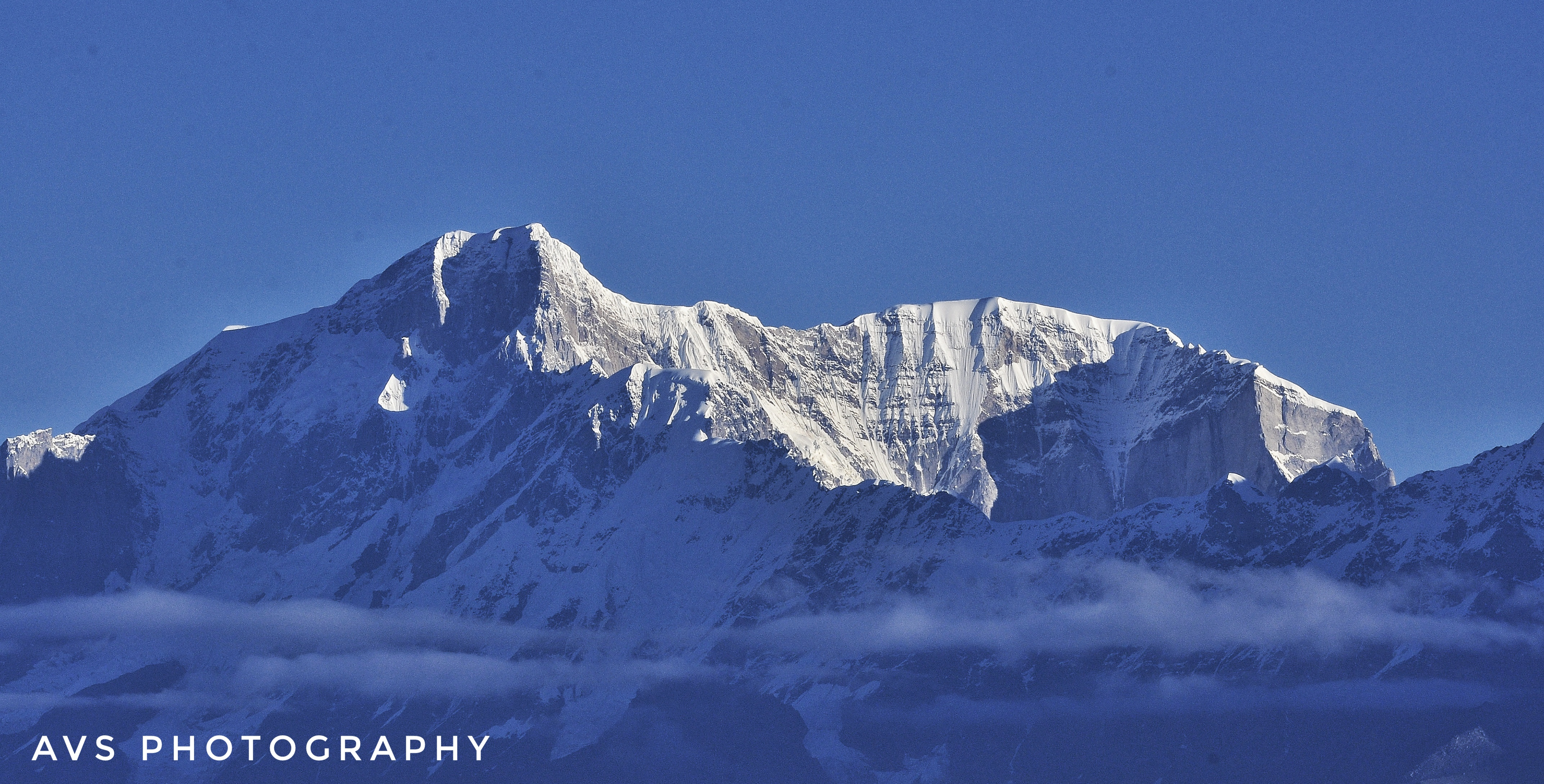
Kedarnath peak and Kedarnath dome

Kedarnath Dome

Highest point
- Elevation: 6,831 m (22,411 ft)
- Prominence: 100 m (300 ft)
- Coordinates: 30°48′31″N 79°04′44″E

Geography
- Location: Uttarakhand, India
- Parent range: Gangotri group, Garhwal Himalaya

Climbing
- First ascent: 1947 by André Roch et al.
- Easiest route: Northwest flank (glacier/snow climb)

== Ascent ==
Kedarnath and Kedarnath Dome were first climbed together, in 1947, by a Swiss team led by André Roch. Their route on Kedarnath Dome, the northwest flank, is still the standard route; it is straightforward and relatively low-angle, and is a popular ski ascent in the spring season. The east face of Kedarnath Dome was first climbed in 1989 by a Hungarian expedition led by Attila Ozsváth. Their climb involved "sixty pitches of very hard climbing."

== Photo gallery ==
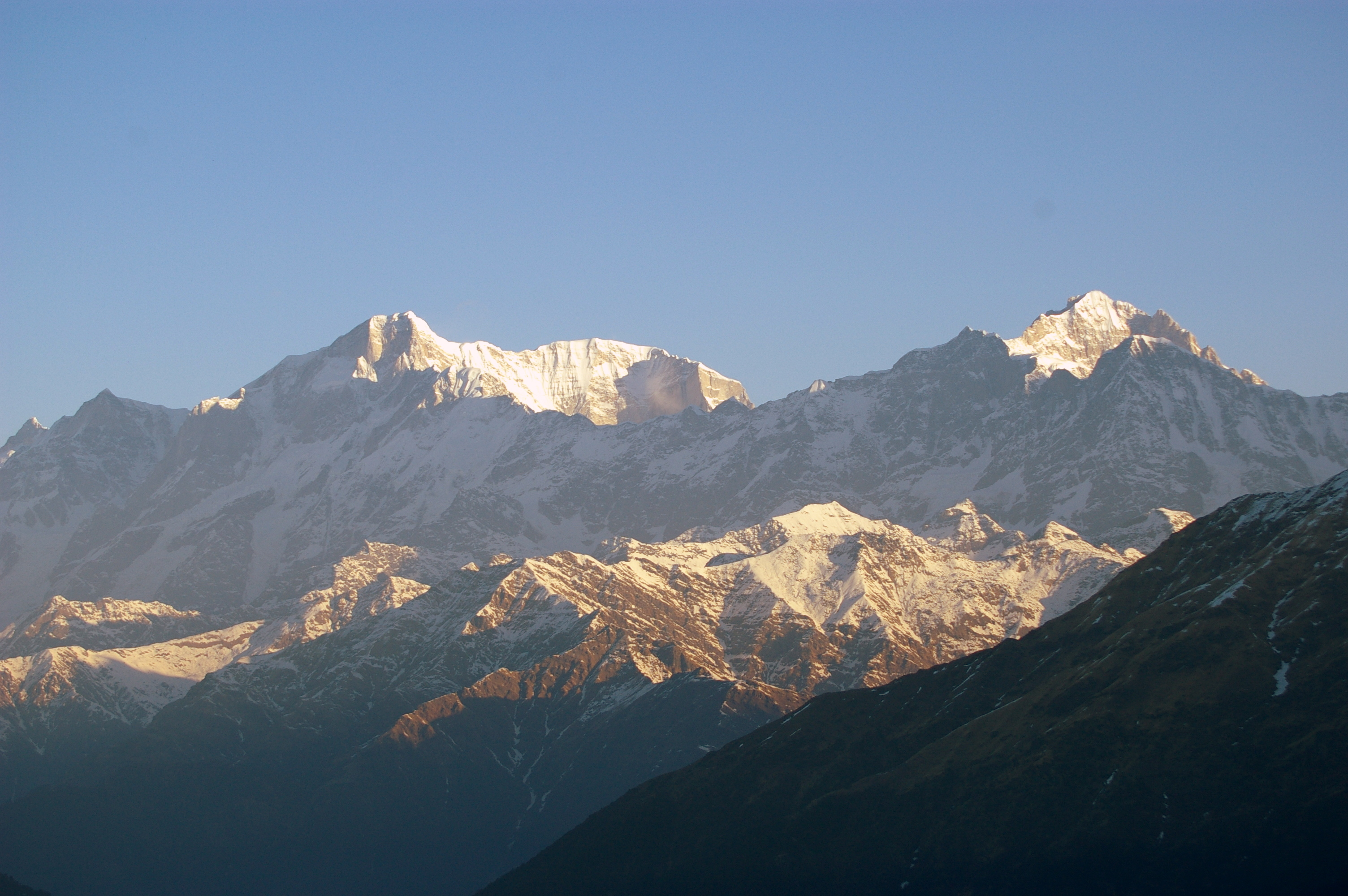
Kedar and Kedar Dome peaks from Tungnath

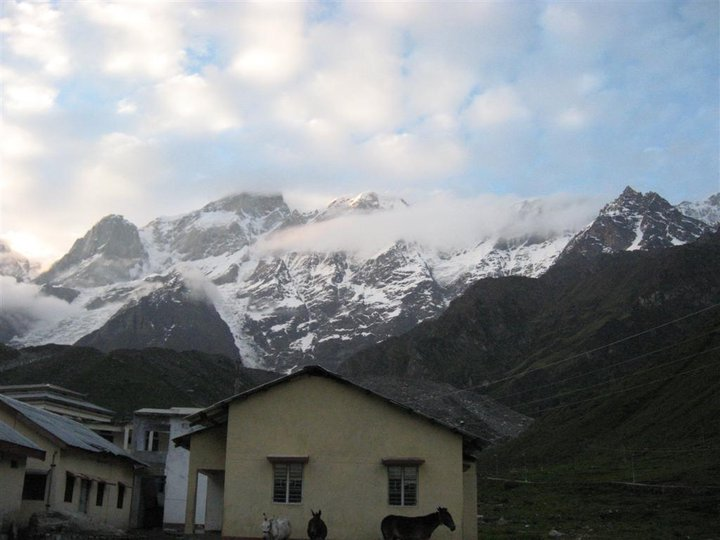
View from Kedarnath

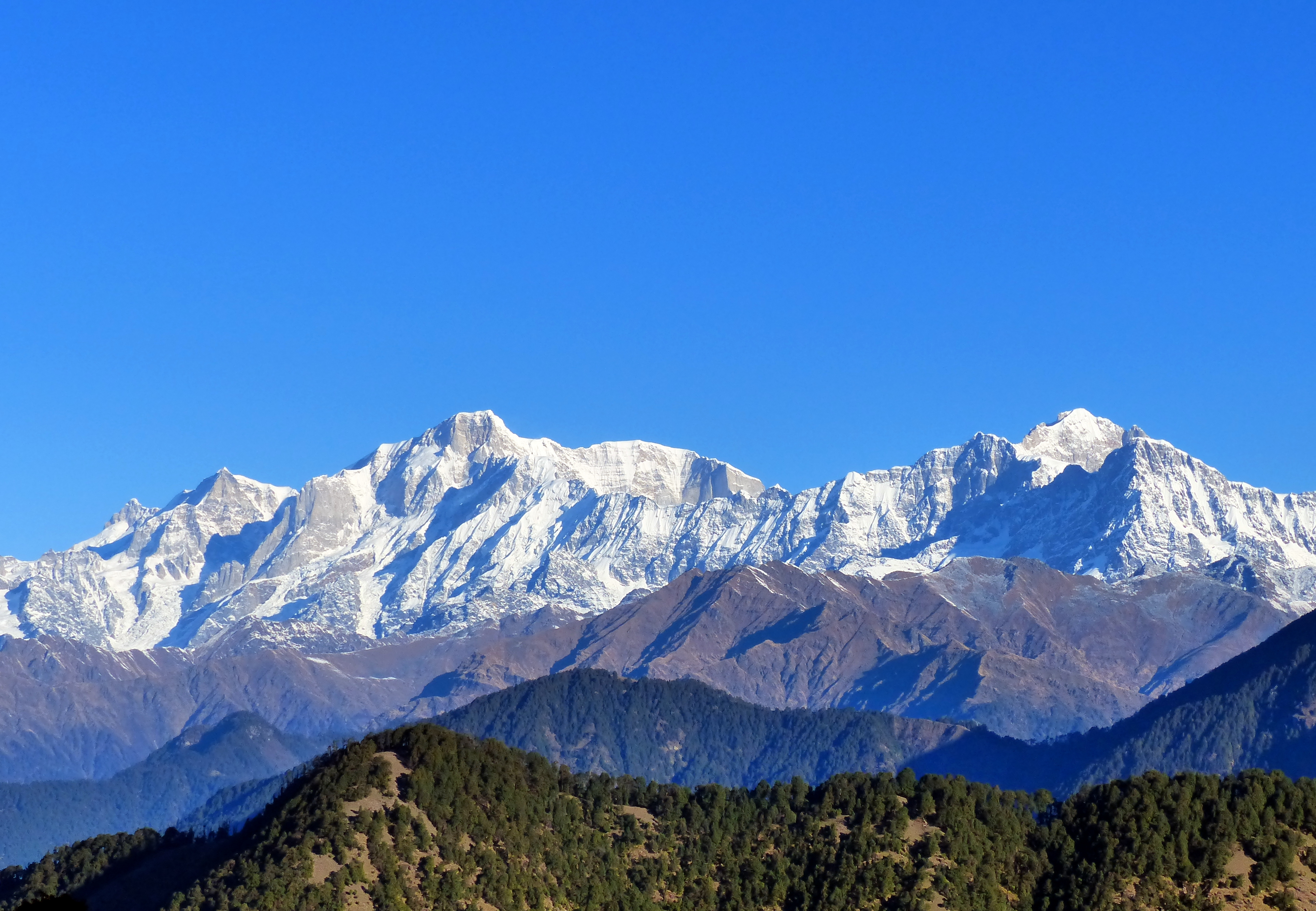
Kedarnath and Kedar Dome in November

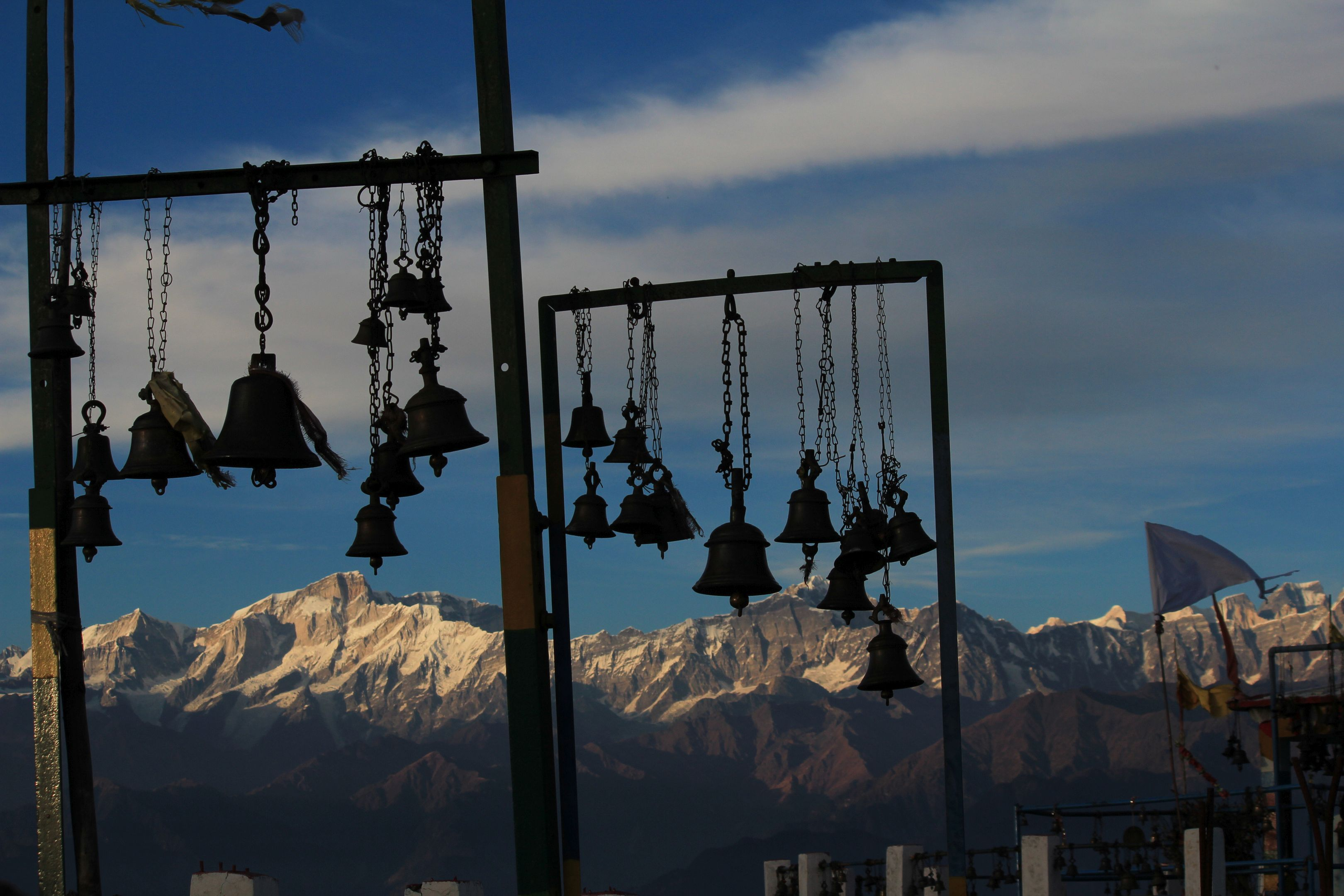
Mount Kedarnath and Kedar Dome with temple bells from Kartik Swami

== See also ==
- List of mountain peaks of Uttarakhand
