= Samarkand =

City in southeastern Uzbekistan

Samarkand Samarqand / Самарқанд (Uzbek)
- District-level city
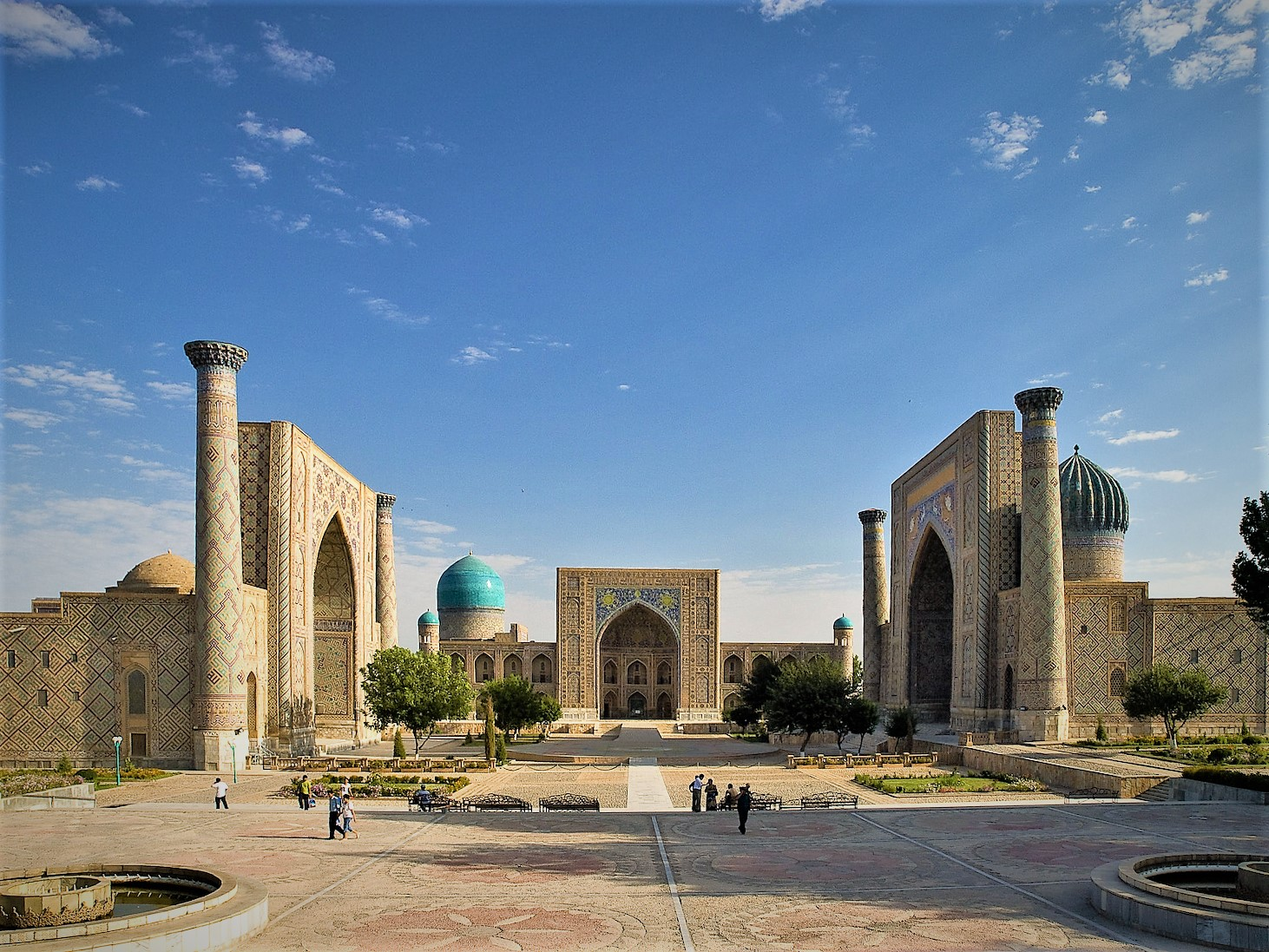
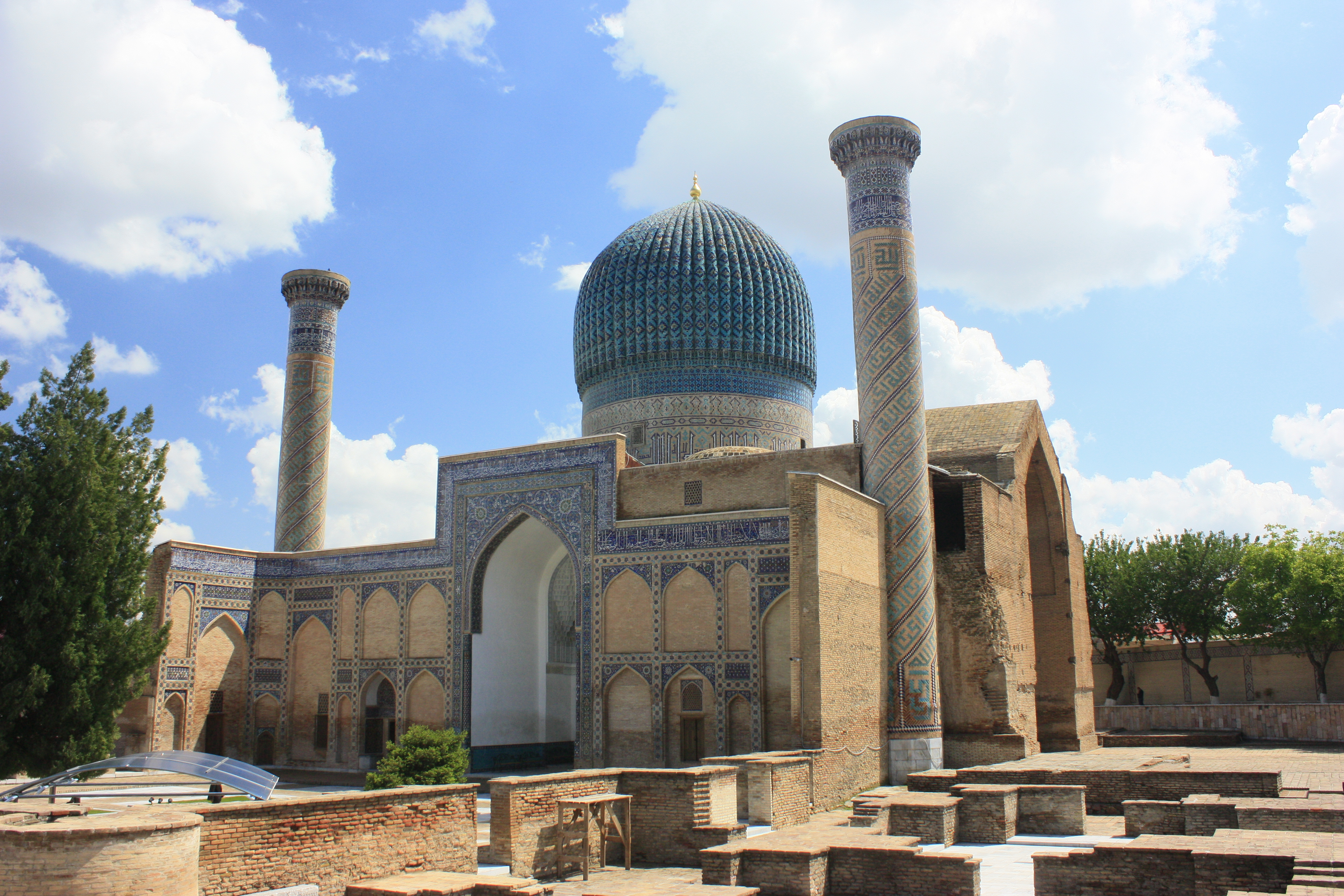
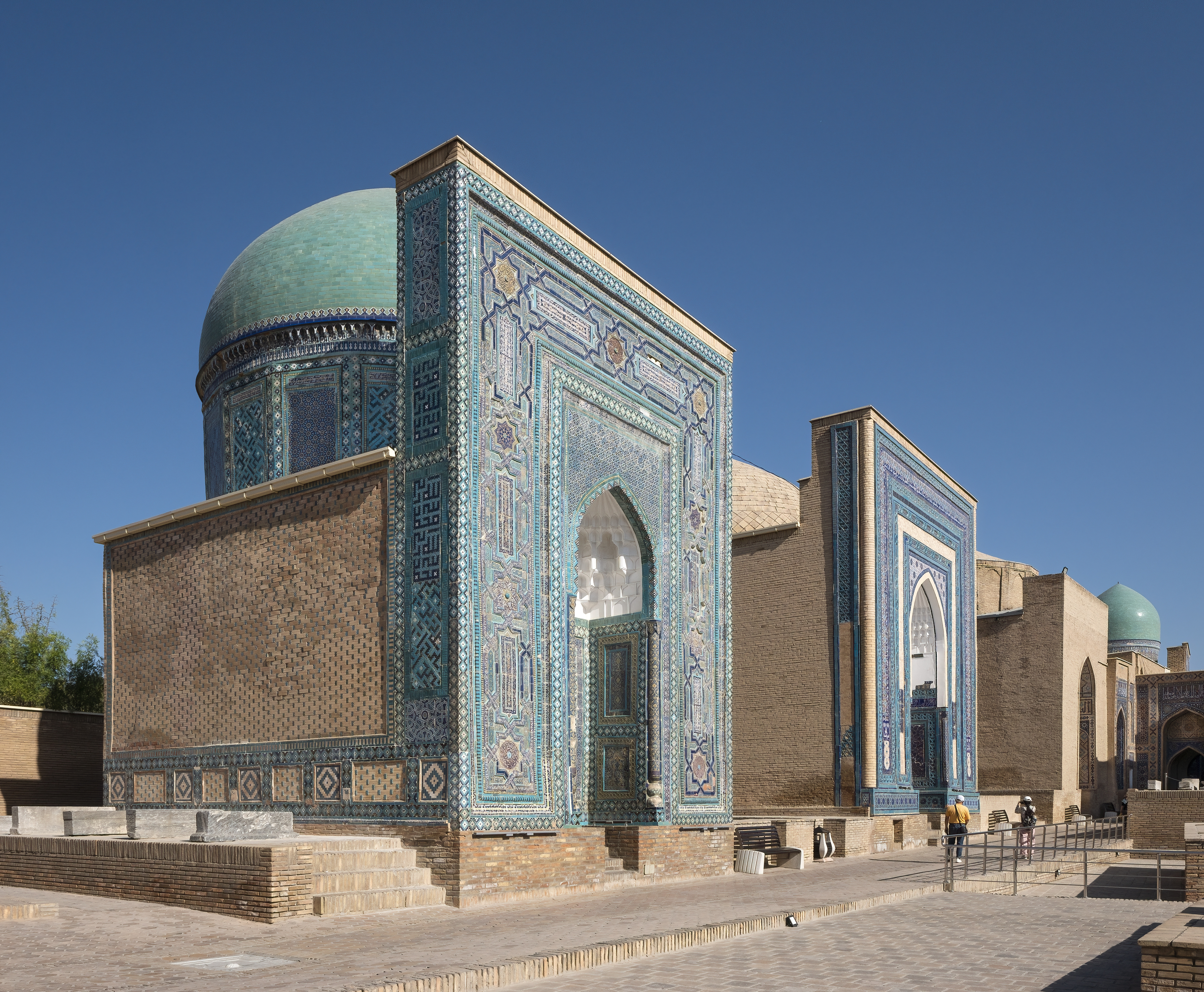
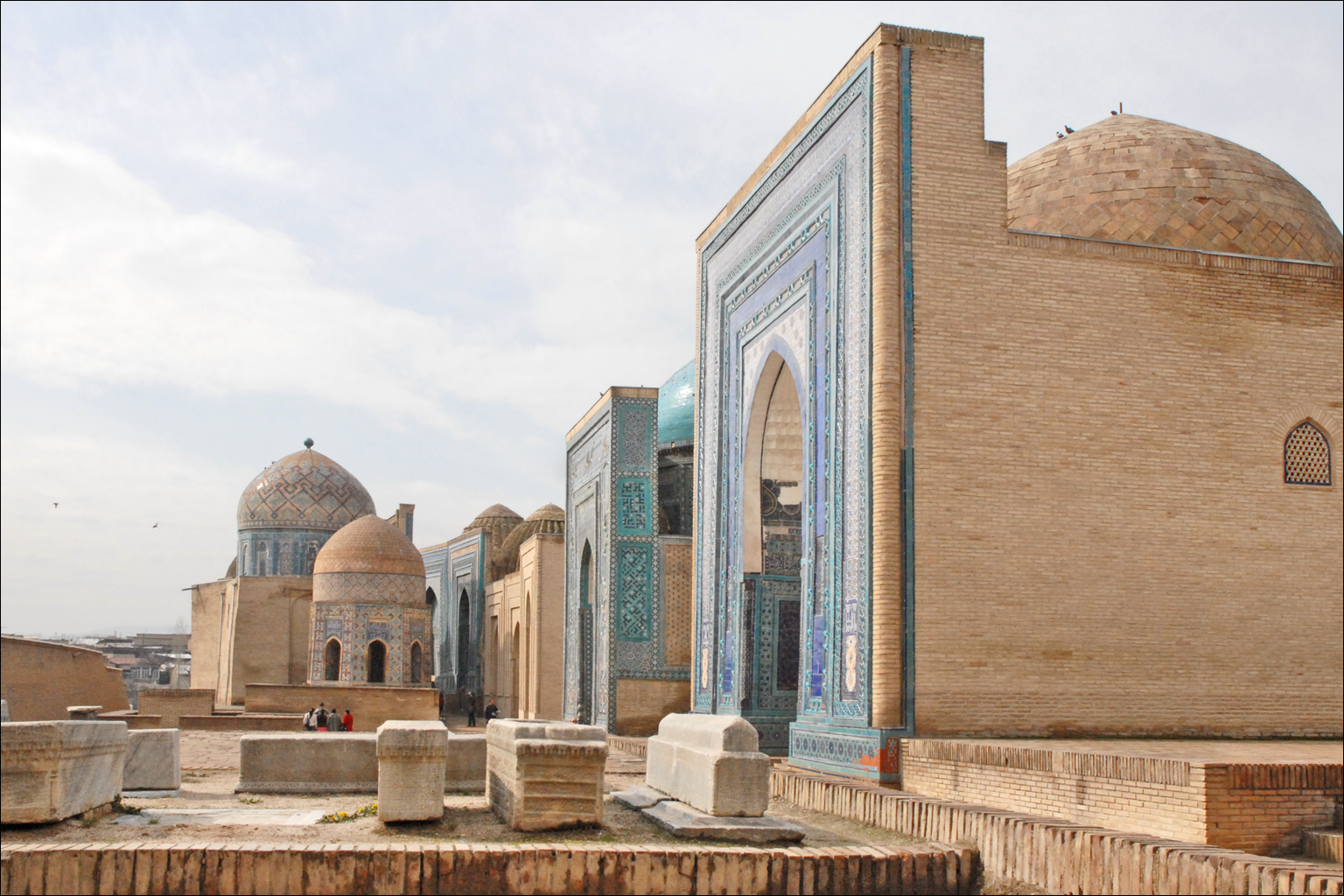
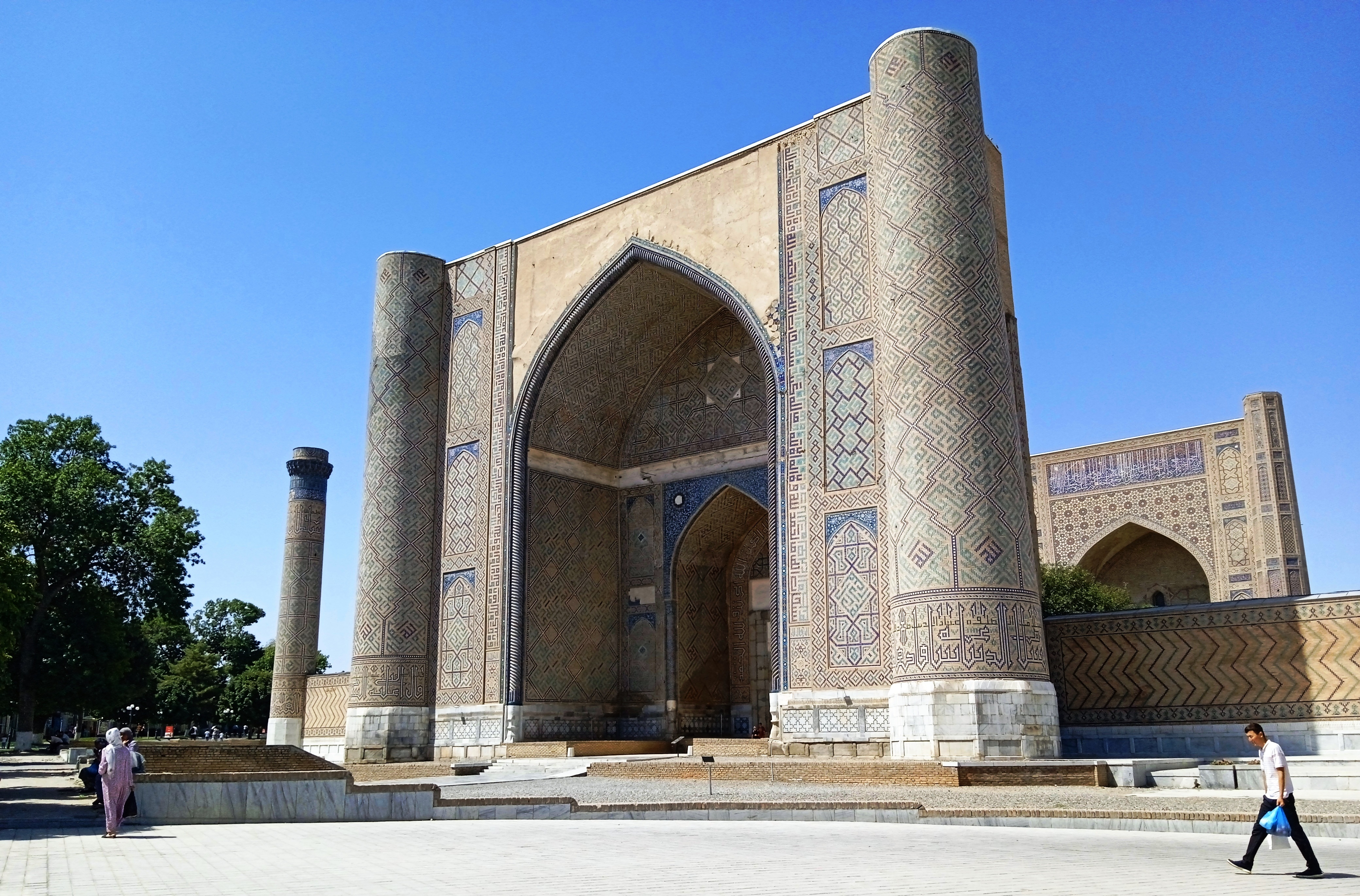
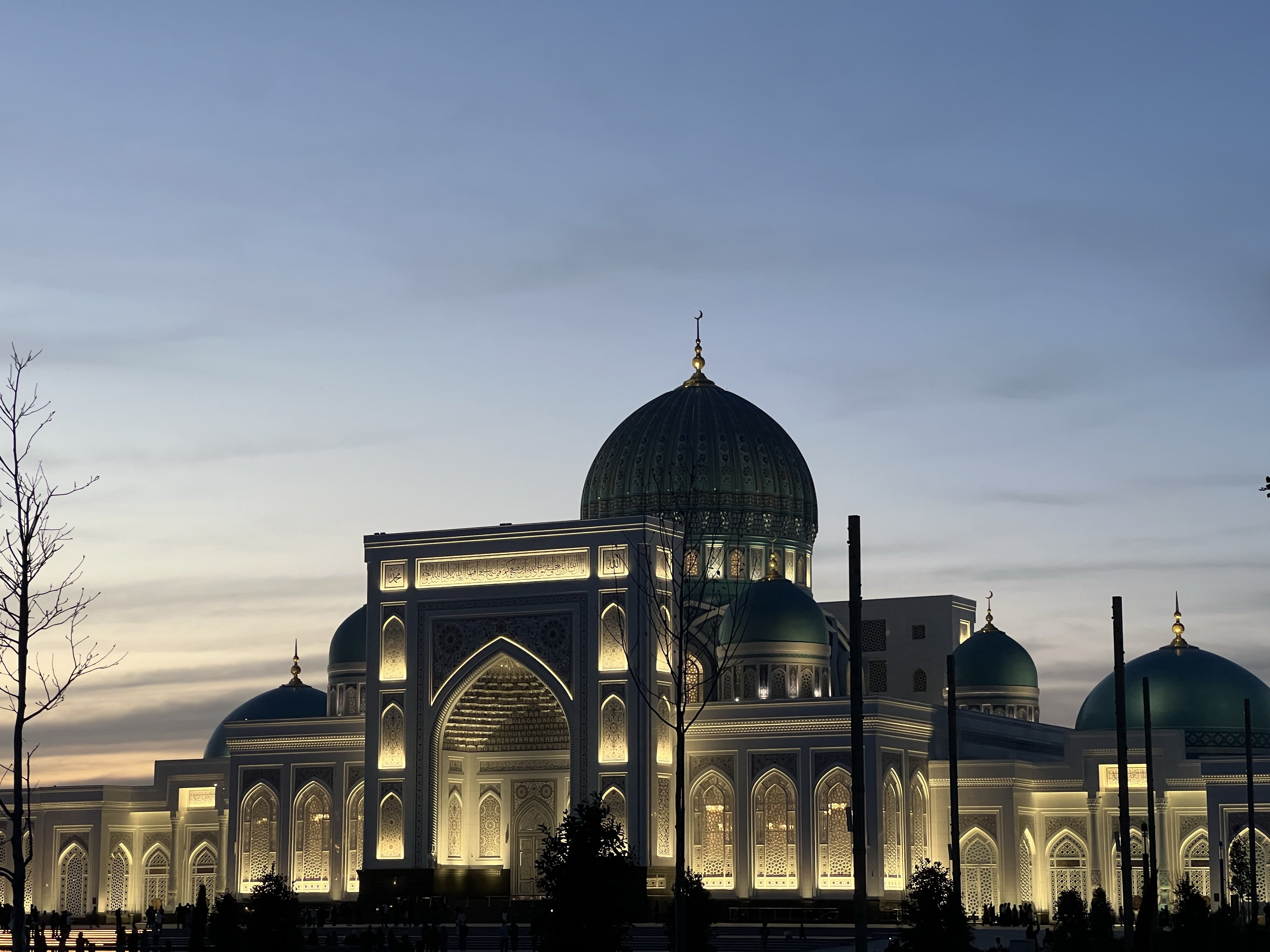
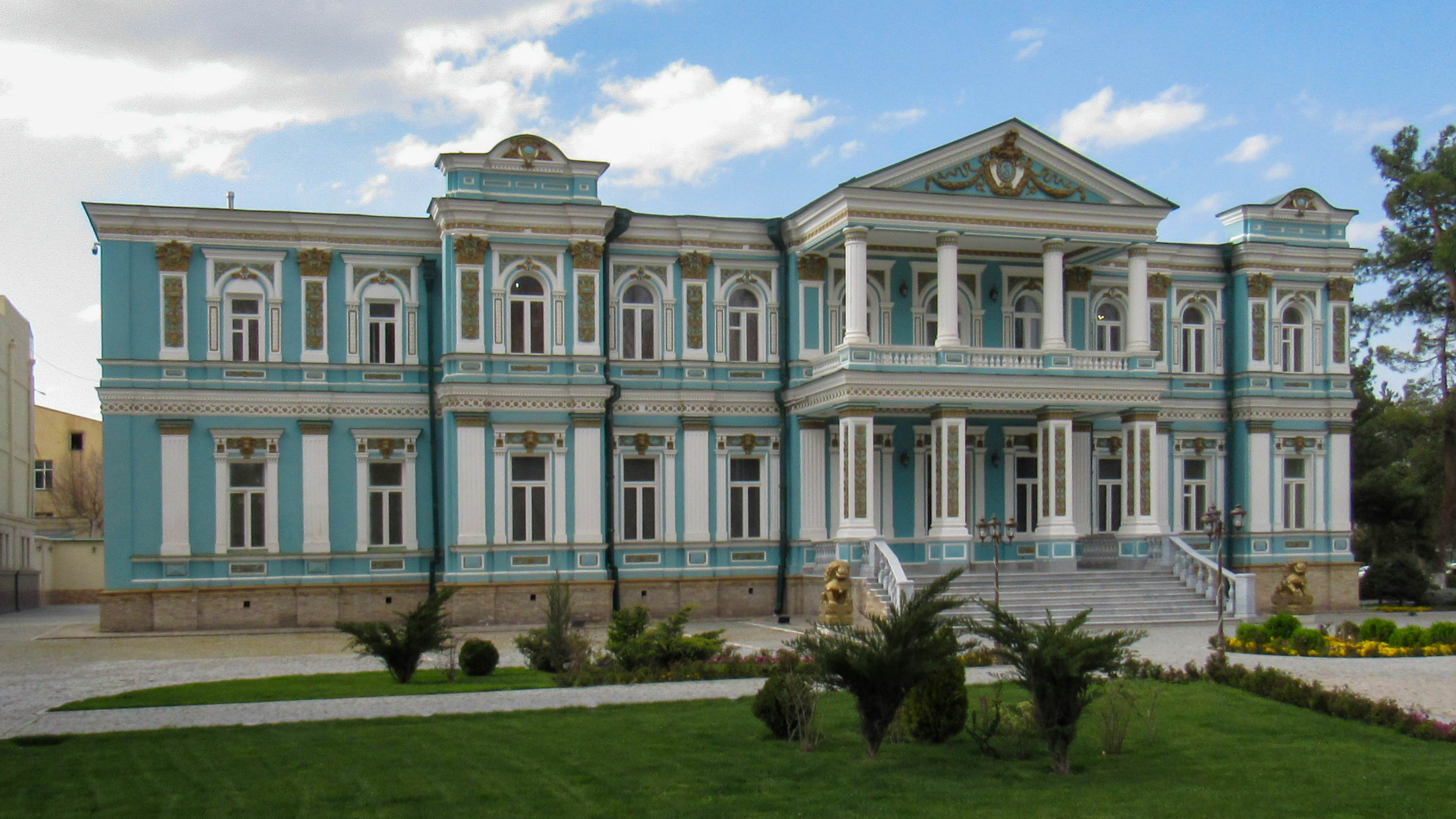
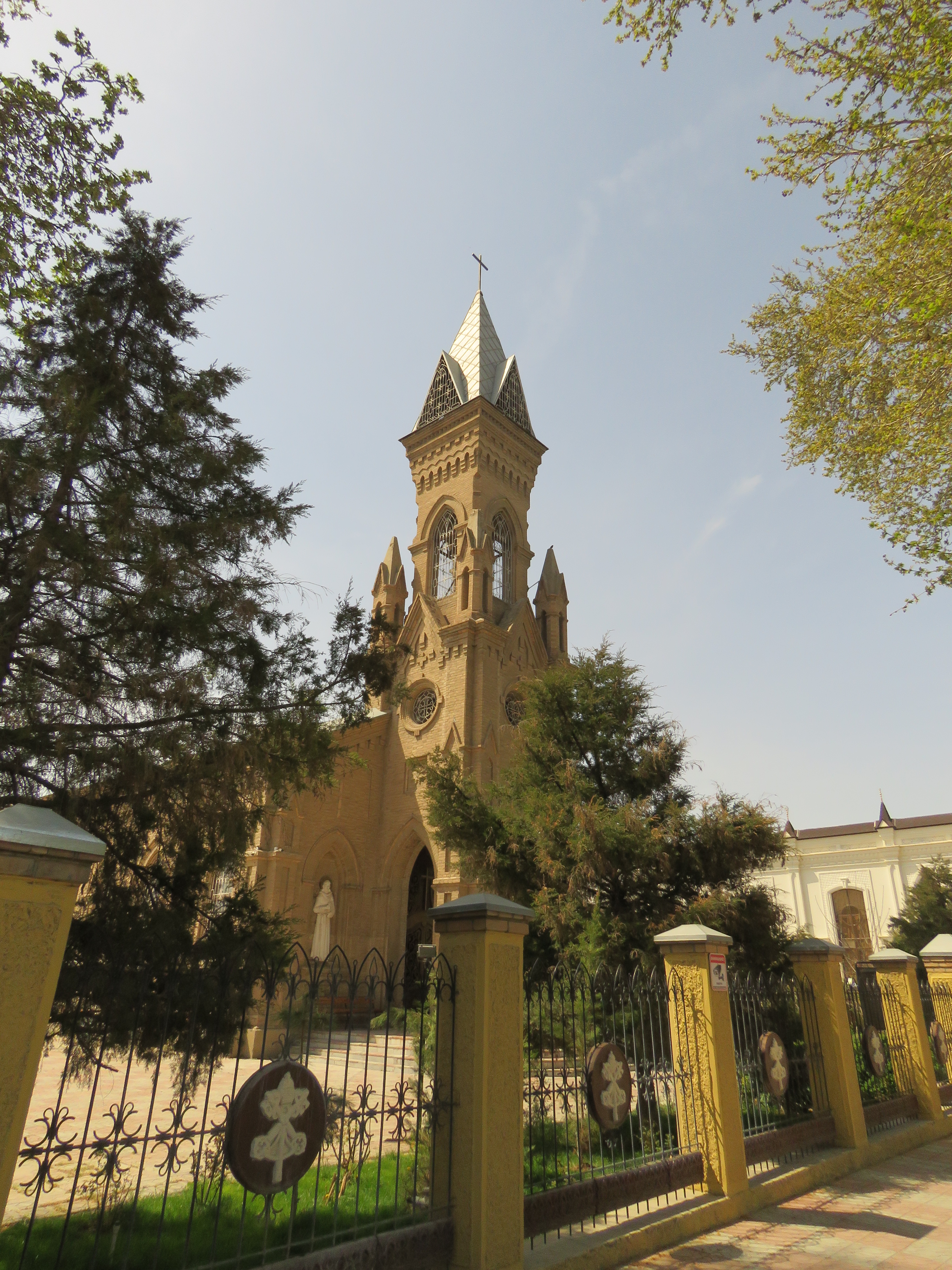
- Registan Square Gur-e-Amir Mausoleum Shah-i-Zinda Mausoleums Shah-i-Zinda Necropolis Bibi-Khanym Mosque Ulugh Beg Observatory Memorial Complex of Imam al-Bukhari Russo-Chinese Bank Building St. John the Baptist Church

- Seal

- Location in Uzbekistan
- Coordinates: 39°39′17″N 66°58′33″E
- Country: Uzbekistan
- Vilayat: Samarqand Vilayat
- Settled: 8th century BC

Government
  - Type: City Administration
  - Mayor: Fazliddin Karimovich Umarov

Area
  - District-level city: 120 km^{2} (46 sq mi)
- Elevation: 705 m (2,313 ft)

Population (11 August 2026)
  - District-level city: 882,000
  - Rank: 2nd
  - Density: 7,300/km^{2} (19,000/sq mi)
  - Metro: 1,300,000
- Demonym: Samarqandlik • Samarkandian
- Time zone: UTC+05:00 (UZT)
- Postal code: 140100
- Website: samarkand.uz

UNESCO World Heritage Site
- Official name: Samarkand – Crossroads of Cultures
- Criteria: Cultural: i, ii, iv
- Reference: 603
- Inscription: 2001 (25th Session)
- Area: 1,123 ha (2,770 acres)
- Buffer zone: 1,369 ha (3,380 acres)

Samarkand (Note: /ˈsæmərkænd/ SAM-ər-kand; Uzbek and Tajik: Самарқанд, romanized: Samarqand, IPA: [sæmærˈqænd, -ænt].) is a major city in south-eastern Uzbekistan. Among the oldest continuously inhabited cities in Central Asia, it had a population of 882,000 inhabitants as of 2026, making it the second-largest city in Uzbekistan after Tashkent. It is the capital of the Samarkand Region and a district-level city that includes the urban-type settlements of Kimyogarlar, Farkhod, and Khishrav. It also served as the initial capital of the Uzbek Soviet Socialist Republic from 1925 until 1930.

There is evidence of human activity in the area of the city dating from the late Paleolithic. Although the exact date of Samarkand's founding remains uncertain, it has been proposed that the city was established between the 8th and 7th centuries BC. Historically, Samarkand has long been one of the principal urban centres of Iranian civilization in Central Asia and played a major role in the cultural and commercial networks of the Silk Road. It was the central city of the Sogdian civilisation. It was conquered by Alexander the Great in 329 BC; at that time, the city was known as Marakanda.

Islam was introduced to the region in the 8th century AD following the Umayyad campaigns. Samarkand was the capital city of the Samanid Empire in the 9th century, under which New Persian gradually replaced Sogdian as the dominant language of the region. In the late 10th century, it became part of the Turkic Karakhanid Khanate. Thereafter, Samarkand was ruled by Turkic or Turko-Mongol dynasties until the Russian annexation in the 19th century, even though the city's culture and literary language remained Persian.

Samarkand prospered from its location on the Silk Road between China, Persia, and Europe. At times, it was one of the largest cities in Central Asia. It was conquered by the Mongol Empire under Genghis Khan in 1220, which saw widespread destruction. In the 14th century, Timur made it the capital of the Timurid Empire, and Samarkand became a noted centre of Islamic scholarly study and the birthplace of the Timurid Renaissance. The Timurid and the later Uzbek Khanate of Bukhara periods made the most important architectural contributions to the urban landscape of the city, including the Registan Square, the Gur-i Amir Mausoleum, the Bibi-Khanym Mosque, and the Shah-i-Zinda Necropolis, which are now the iconic symbols of the city, well known for their cobalt and turquoise majolica tilework. In 2001, UNESCO added the city to its World Heritage List as Samarkand – Crossroads of Cultures.

Samarkand has a multicultural and plurilingual identity and history that was significantly modified by the process of national delimitation in Central Asia. A significant part of the city's population consists of bilingual Tajik speakers, whereas Uzbek is the official language and Russian is also widely used in the public sphere, in accordance with the language policy of Uzbekistan.

Modern Samarkand is divided into two parts: the old city, which includes historical monuments, shops, and old private houses; and the new city, which was developed during the days of the Russian Empire and the Soviet Union and includes administrative buildings along with cultural centres and educational institutions.

== Name ==
The city was named Marakanda when it was captured by Alexander the Great in 329 BC, a name rendered in Greek as Μαράκανδα.

According to some sources, the present name comes from the Eastern Iranian language Sogdian: samar ('stone, rock') and kand ('fort, town'). In this respect, Samarkand shares the same meaning as the name of the Uzbek capital, Tashkent, with tash- being the Turkic term for 'stone' and -kent the Turkic analogue of kand, borrowed from Iranian languages. This cannot be proven, because the city was given its name long after the Turkification of the Sogdians.

According to more realistic and historical sources, and to the 11th-century scholar Mahmud al-Kashghari, the city was known in Karakhanid Turkic as Sämizkänd or Sämerkänd (سَمِزْکَنْدْ), meaning 'fat city'. The 16th-century Mughal emperor Babur also mentioned the city under this name, and the 15th-century Castilian traveller Ruy González de Clavijo stated that Samarkand was simply a distorted form of it.

Some languages have their own spellings or variations of the name, such as the French 'Samarcande', the Italian and Spanish 'Samarcanda', and the Turkish 'Semerkant'.

== History ==
=== Early history ===
Samarkand is one of the oldest inhabited cities in Central Asia, along with Bukhara, prospering from its location on the trade route between China and Europe. There is no direct evidence of when it was founded. Researchers at the Institute of Archaeology of Samarkand date the city's founding to around 700 BC.

Archaeological excavations conducted within the city limits (Syob and midtown), as well as in suburban areas (Hojamazgil and Sazag'on), have unearthed 40,000-year-old evidence of human activity dating back to the Upper Paleolithic. A group of Mesolithic (12th–7th millennia BC) archaeological sites was discovered in the suburbs of Sazag'on-1, Zamichatosh, and Okhalik. The Syob and Darg'om canals, supplying the city and its suburbs with water, appeared around the 7th–5th centuries BC (early Iron Age).

After the Indo-Iranian migrations in the second millennium BC, Samarkand became one of the main centres of the Sogdian civilisation. By the time of the Achaemenid dynasty of Persia, the city had become the capital of the Sogdian satrapy.

=== Hellenistic period ===
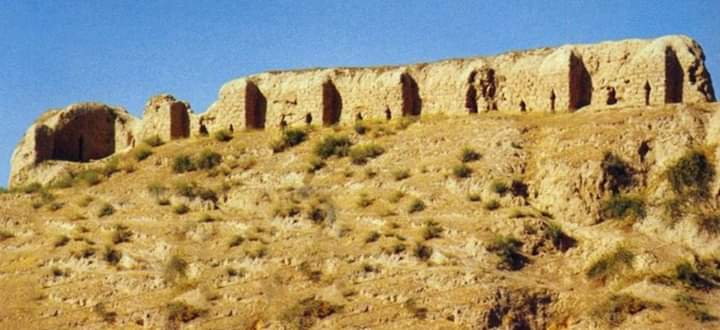
Ancient city walls of Samarkand, 4th century BC

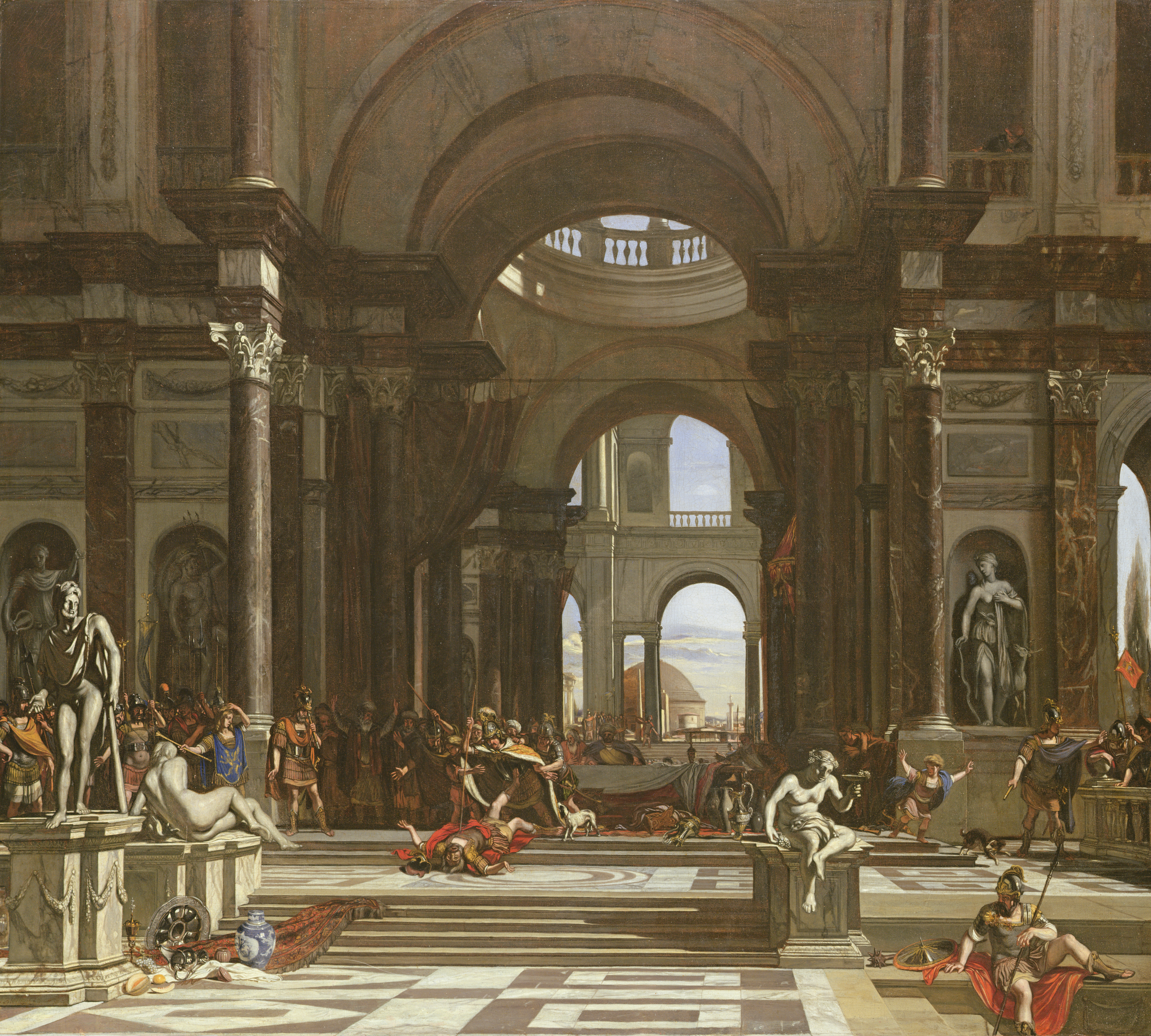
Alexander the Great Slaying Cleitus in Samarkand, by Daniël de Blieck. Ferens Art Gallery, Hull.

Alexander the Great conquered Samarkand in 329 BC. The city was known as Maracanda (Μαράκανδα) to the Greeks. Written sources offer clues as to the subsequent system of government. They mention one Orepius, who became ruler 'not from ancestors, but as a gift of Alexander'.

While Samarkand suffered significant damage during Alexander's initial conquest, the city recovered rapidly and flourished under the new Hellenic influence. There were also major new construction techniques. Oblong bricks were replaced with square ones, and superior methods of masonry and plastering were introduced.

Alexander's conquests introduced classical Greek culture into Central Asia, and for a time, Greek aesthetics heavily influenced local artisans. This Hellenistic legacy continued as the city became part of various successor states in the centuries following Alexander's death: the Greek Seleucid Empire, Greco-Bactrian Kingdom, and Kushan Empire (even though the Yuezhi themselves originated in Central Asia). After the Kushan state lost control of Sogdia during the 3rd century AD, Samarkand went into decline as a centre of economic, cultural, and political power. It did not significantly revive until the 5th century.

=== Sasanian era ===
Samarkand was conquered by the Persian Sasanians c. 260 AD. Under Sasanian rule, the region became an essential site for Manichaeism and facilitated the dissemination of the religion throughout Central Asia.

=== Hephthalites and Turkic Khaganate era ===
Between AD 350 and 375, Samarkand was conquered by the nomadic tribes of the Xionites, whose origin remains controversial. The settlement of nomadic groups in Samarkand is confirmed by archaeological material from the 4th century. The culture of the nomads from the Middle Syrdarya basin spread in the region. Between 457 and 509, Samarkand was part of the Kidarite state.

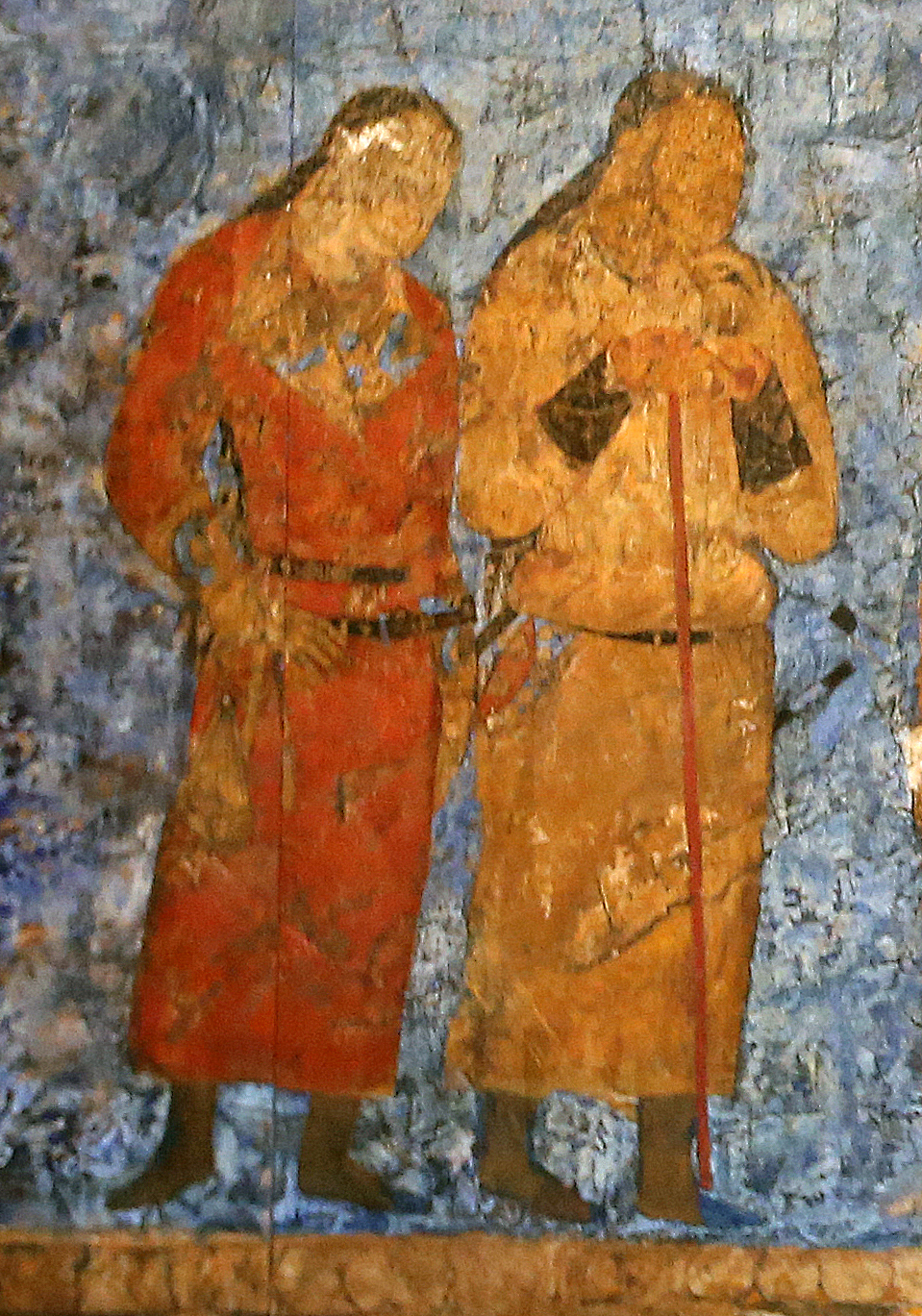
Turkic officers during an audience with king Varkhuman of Samarkand. 648–651 AD, Afrasiyab murals, Samarkand.

After the Hephthalites ('White Huns') conquered Samarkand, they controlled it until the Göktürks, in an alliance with the Sasanian Persians, won it at the Battle of Bukhara, c. 560 AD.

In the middle of the 6th century, a Turkic state was formed in the Altai, founded by the Ashina dynasty. The new state was named the Turkic Khaganate after the Turkic people, who were headed by the ruler—the Khagan. From 557 to 561, the Hephthalite Empire was defeated by the joint actions of the Turks and Sasanians, which led to the establishment of a common border between the two empires.

In the early Middle Ages, Samarkand was surrounded by four rows of defensive walls and had four gates. An ancient Turkic burial with a horse was investigated in the territory of Samarkand. It dates back to the 6th century.

During the period of the ruler of the Western Turkic Khaganate, Tong Yabghu Qaghan (618–630), family relations were established with the ruler of Samarkand—Tong Yabghu Qaghan gave him his daughter.

Some parts of Samarkand have been Christian since the 4th century. In the 5th century, a Nestorian chair was established in Samarkand. At the beginning of the 8th century, it was transformed into a Nestorian metropolitanate. Discussions and polemics arose between the Sogdian followers of Christianity and Manichaeism, as reflected in the documents.

=== Early Islamic era ===
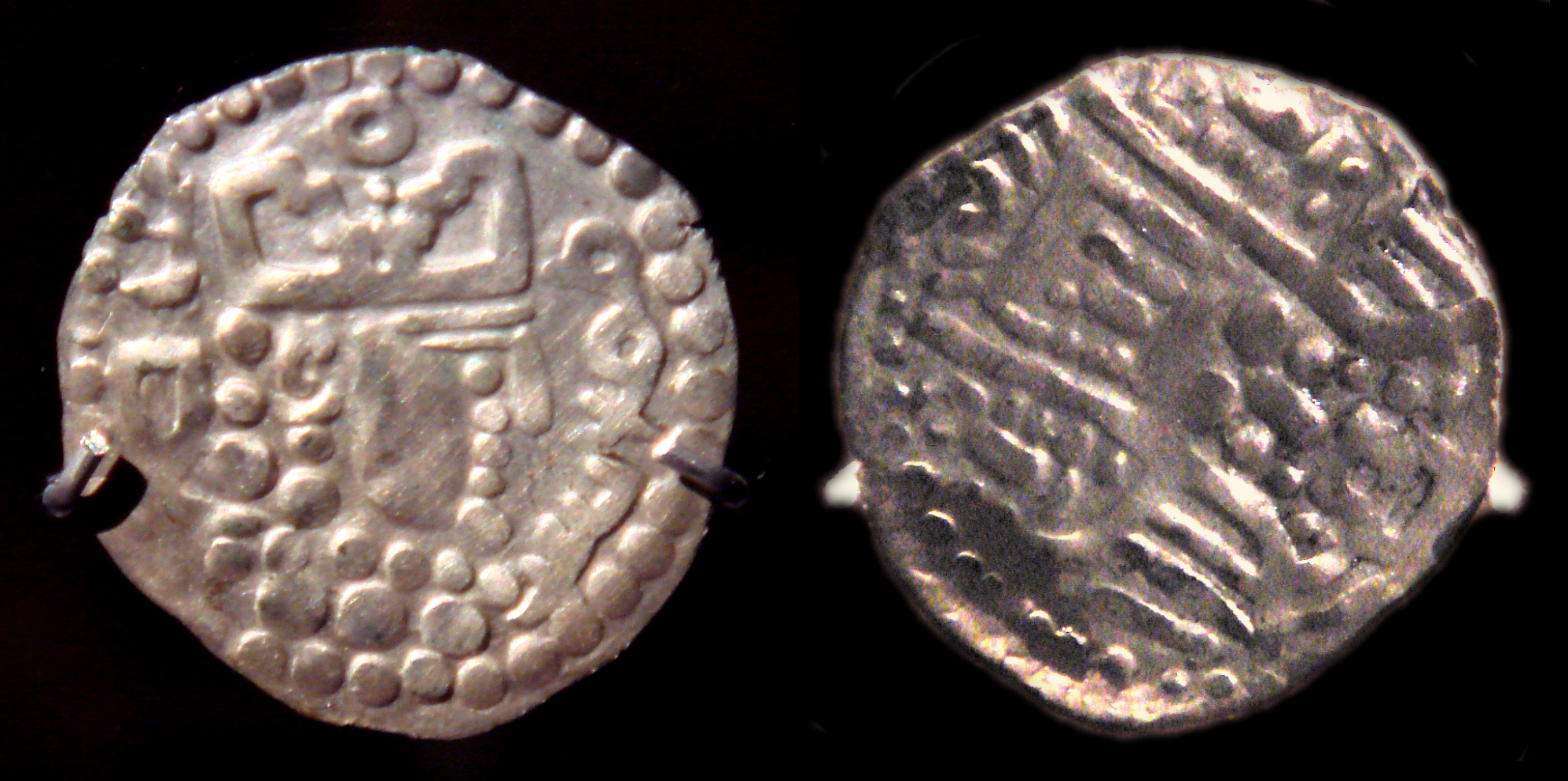
Coin of Sogdian ruler Turgar, the last Ikhshid of Samarkand, Penjikent, 8th century AD, National Museum of Antiquities of Tajikistan.

The armies of the Umayyad Caliphate under Qutayba ibn Muslim captured the city c. 712 AD. During this period, Samarkand was a diverse religious community and was home to a number of religions, including Zoroastrianism, Buddhism, Hinduism, Manichaeism, Judaism, and Christianity, with most of the population following Zoroastrianism.

Qutayba generally did not settle Arabs in Central Asia; he made the local rulers pay him tribute but largely left them to their own devices. Samarkand was the major exception to this policy: Qutayba established an Arab garrison and an Arab governmental administration in the city, its Zoroastrian fire temples were razed, and a mosque was built. Most of the city's population embraced Islam.

As a long-term result, Samarkand developed into a centre of Islamic and Arabic learning. At the end of the 740s, a movement of those dissatisfied with the power of the Umayyads emerged in the Arab Caliphate, led by the Abbasid commander Abu Muslim, who, after the victory of the uprising, became the governor of Khorasan and Transoxiana (750–755). He chose Samarkand as his residence. His name is associated with the construction of a multi-kilometre defensive wall around the city and the palace.

Legend has it that during Abbasid rule, the secret of papermaking was obtained from two Chinese prisoners from the Battle of Talas in 751, which led to the foundation of the first paper mill in the Islamic world at Samarkand. The invention then spread to the rest of the Islamic world and thence to Europe.

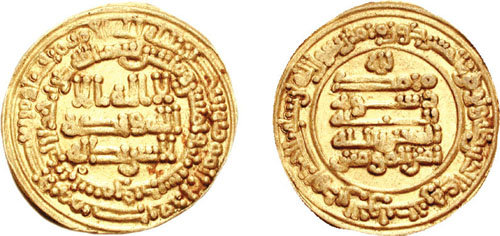
Gold dinar of caliph al-Mu'tazz, minted at Samarkand in AH 253 (867 AD). His reign marks the apogee of the decline of the Caliphate's central authority.

Abbasid control of Samarkand soon dissipated and was replaced by that of the Samanids (875–999), though the Samanids were still nominal vassals of the Caliph during their control of Samarkand. Under Samanid rule, the city became a capital of the Samanid dynasty and an even more important node of numerous trade routes. The Samanids were overthrown by the Karakhanids around 999. Over the next 200 years, Samarkand was ruled by a succession of Turkic tribes, including the Seljuqs and the Khwarazmshahs.

The 10th-century Persian author Istakhri, who travelled in Transoxiana, provides a vivid description of the natural riches of the region he calls 'Smarkandian Sogd':

I know no place in it or in Samarkand itself where, if one ascends some elevated ground, one does not see greenery and a pleasant place, and nowhere near it are mountains lacking in trees or a dusty steppe... Samarkandian Sogd... [extends] eight days' travel through unbroken greenery and gardens... The greenery of the trees and sown land extends along both sides of the river [Sogd]... and beyond these fields is pasture for flocks. Every town and settlement has a fortress... It is the most fruitful of all the countries of Allah; in it are the best trees and fruits, in every home are gardens, cisterns, and flowing water.

=== Karakhanid (Ilek-Khanid) period (11th–12th centuries) ===
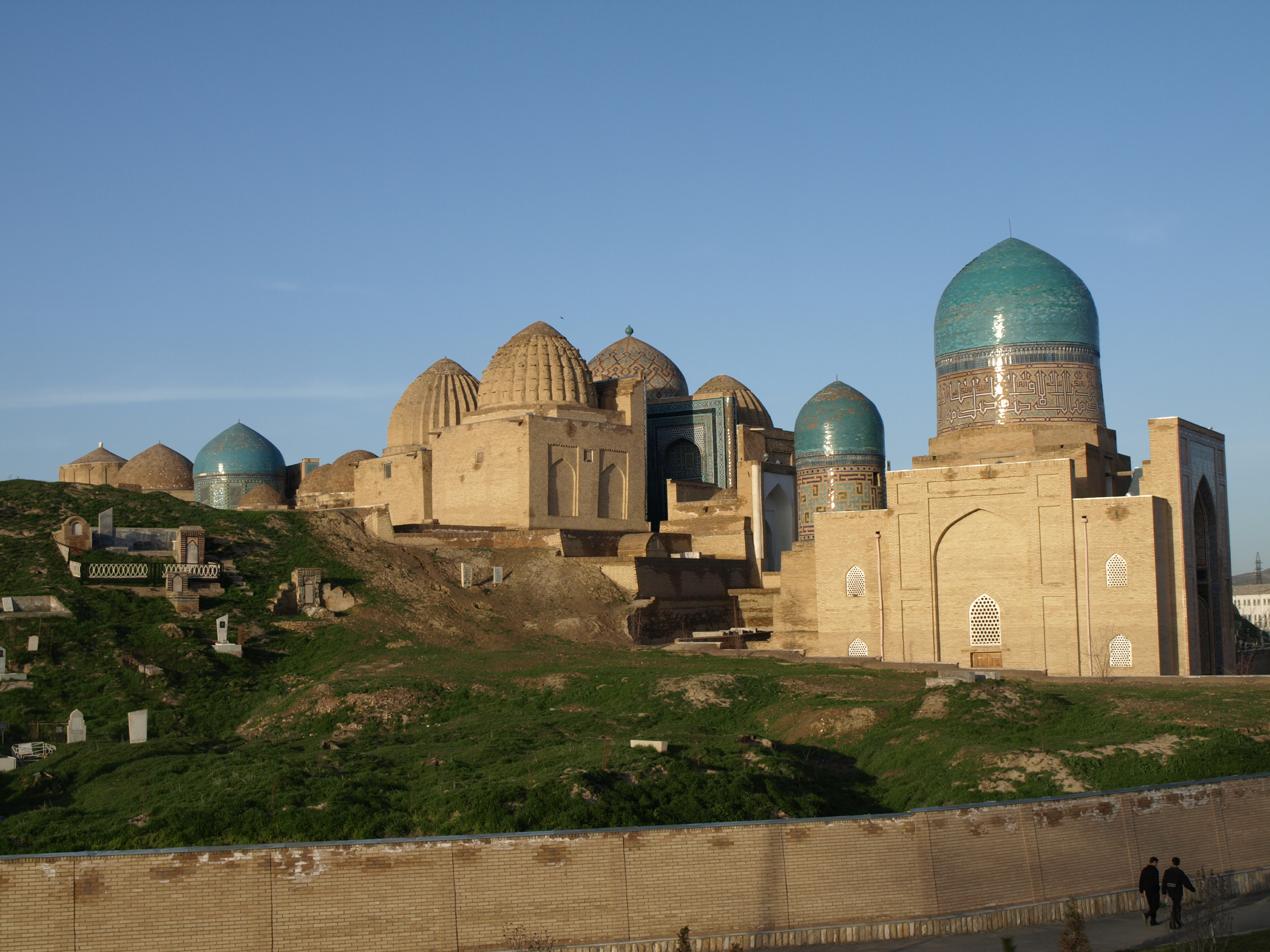
Shah-i Zinda memorial complex, 11th–15th centuries

After the fall of the Samanid state in 999, it was replaced by the Qarakhanid state, ruled by the Turkic Qarakhanid dynasty. After the Qarakhanid state split into two parts, Samarkand became part of the Western Qarakhanid Khaganate and, from 1040 to 1212, was its capital. The founder of the Western Qarakhanid Khaganate was Ibrahim Tamgach Khan (1040–1068). He was the first to build a madrasa in Samarkand with state funds and supported the development of culture in the region. During his reign, a public hospital (bemoristan) and a madrasa were established in Samarkand, where medicine was also taught.

The most striking monument of the Qarakhanid era in Samarkand was the palace of Ibrahim ibn Hussein (1178–1202), which was built in the citadel in the 12th century. During the excavations, fragments of monumental painting were discovered. On the eastern wall, a Turkic warrior was depicted, dressed in a yellow caftan and holding a bow. Horses, hunting dogs, birds, and period-style women were also depicted here.

The memorial complex of Shah-i-Zinda was founded by the rulers of the Qarakhanid dynasty in the 11th century.

By the beginning of the 13th century, three major memorial and religious centres had emerged in Samarkand: the area around the congregational mosque and the Qarakhanid mausoleum; the complex of Qutham ibn Abbas; and the Chokardiza cemetery, where prominent Muslim theologians were buried. The Mongol conquest led to the destruction of most of Samarkand's monuments. However, the complex of Qutham ibn Abbas survived and subsequently became one of the city's most important sacred sites.

=== Mongol period ===
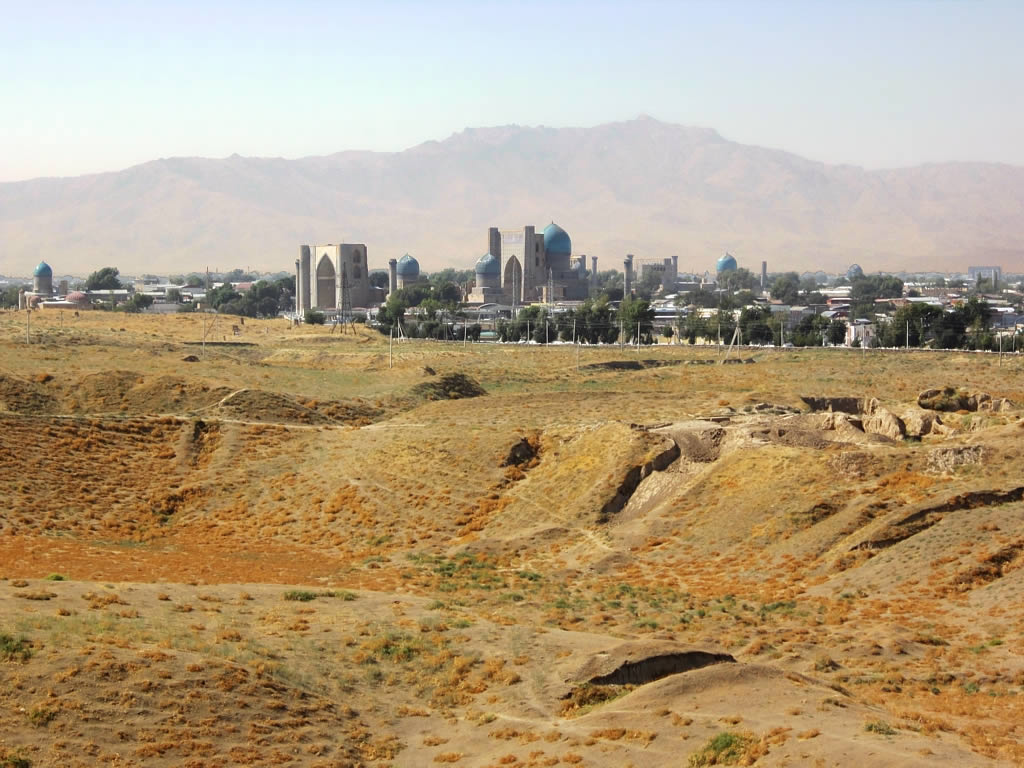
Ruins of Afrasiab – ancient Samarkand destroyed by Genghis Khan.

The Mongols conquered Samarkand in 1220. Juvayni writes that Genghis killed all who had taken refuge in the citadel and the mosque, pillaged the city completely, and conscripted 30,000 young men along with 30,000 craftsmen. Samarkand suffered at least one other Mongol sack, by Khan Baraq, to obtain treasure he needed to pay an army. It remained part of the Chagatai Khanate (one of four Mongol successor realms) until 1370.

The Yenisei area had a community of weavers of Chinese origin, and Samarkand and Outer Mongolia both had artisans of Chinese origin, as reported by Changchun. After Genghis Khan conquered Central Asia, foreigners were chosen as governmental administrators; Chinese and Qara-Khitays (Khitans) were appointed as co-managers of gardens and fields in Samarkand, which Muslims were not permitted to manage on their own. The khanate allowed the establishment of Christian bishoprics.

The Travels of Marco Polo, in which Polo records his journey along the Silk Road in the late 13th century, describes Samarkand as 'a very large and splendid city'.

=== Timur's rule (1370–1405) ===
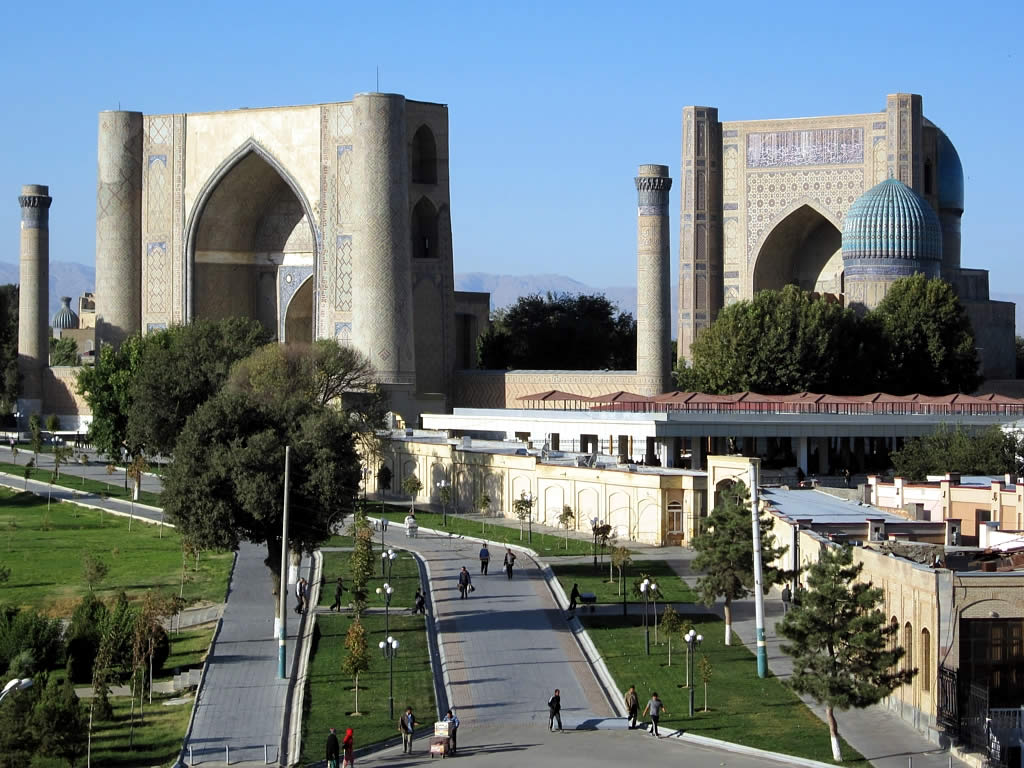
Bibi-Khanym Friday Mosque, 1399–1404

Ibn Battuta, who visited in 1333, called Samarkand 'one of the greatest and finest of cities, and most perfect of them in beauty'. He also noted that the orchards were supplied with water via norias.

Several decades after the Mongol conquest, a Friday mosque was erected on Registan Square in Samarkand, the site that had served as the focal point of the Sarbadar uprising of 1365.

In 1365, a revolt against Chagatai Mongol control occurred in Samarkand. In 1370, the conqueror Timur (Tamerlane), founder and ruler of the Timurid Empire, made Samarkand his capital. Timur used various tools for legitimation, including urban planning in his capital, Samarkand. Over the next 35 years, he rebuilt most of the city and populated it with great artisans and craftsmen from across the empire. Timur gained a reputation as a patron of the arts, and Samarkand grew to become the centre of the region of Transoxiana. Timur's commitment to the arts is evident in how, in contrast with the ruthlessness he showed his enemies, he demonstrated mercy toward those with special artistic abilities. The lives of artists, craftsmen, and architects were spared so that they could improve and beautify Timur's capital.

Timur was also directly involved in construction projects, and his visions often exceeded the technical abilities of his workers. The city was in a state of constant construction, and Timur would often order buildings to be done and redone quickly if he was unsatisfied with the results. By his orders, Samarkand could be reached only by roads; deep ditches were dug, and walls 8 km (5 mi) in circumference separated the city from its surrounding neighbours. At this time, the city had a population of about 150,000.

Henry III of Castile's ambassador Ruy Gonzalez de Clavijo, who visited Samarkand between 8 September and 20 November 1404, attested to the never-ending construction that went on in the city: 'The Mosque which Timur had built seemed to us the noblest of all those we visited in the city of Samarkand.'

=== Ulugh Beg's period (1409–1449) ===
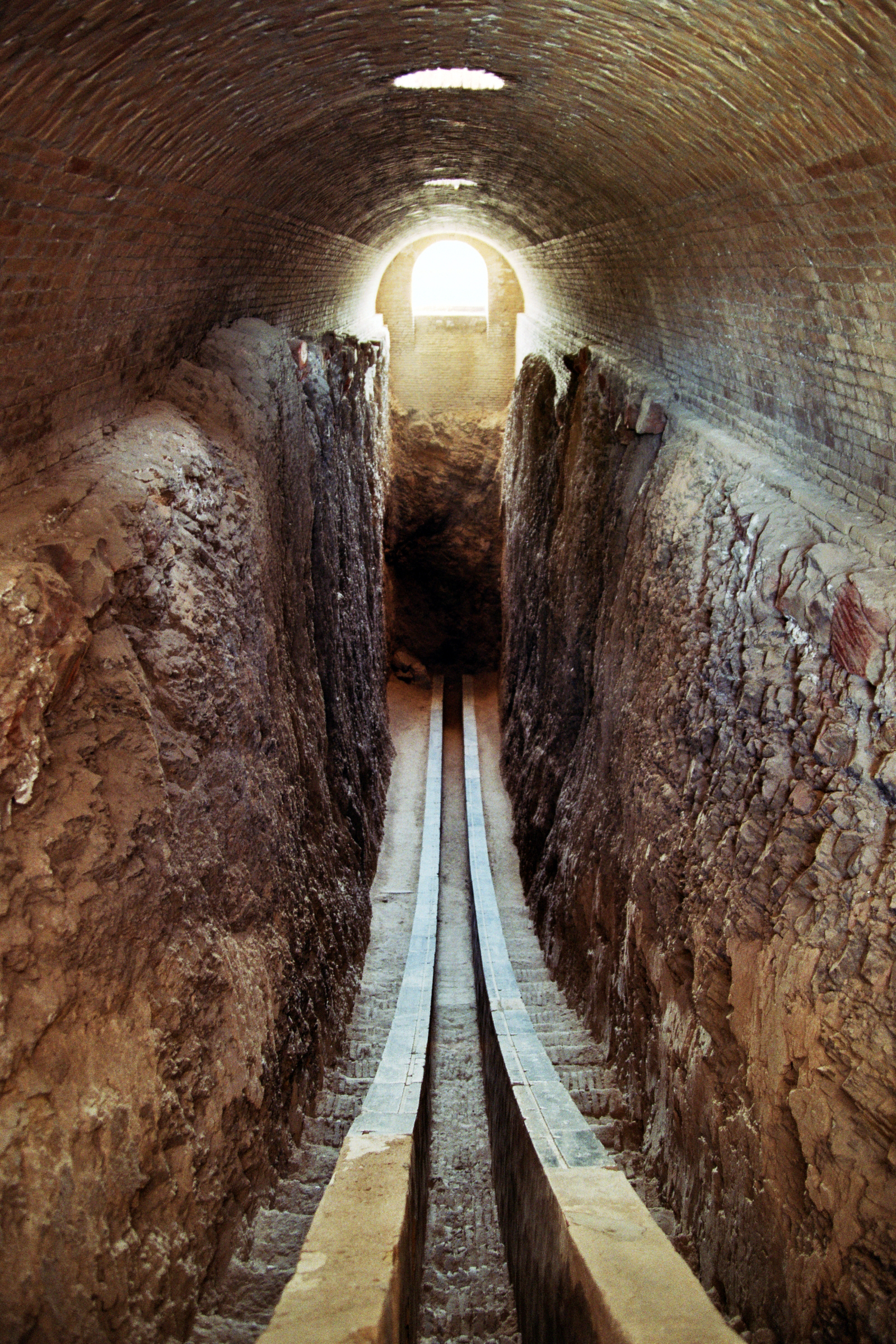
Many prominent astronomers worked at Ulugh Beg's observatory, which contained this mural sextant, constructed in Samarkand during the 15th century.

Between 1417 and 1420, Timur's grandson Ulugh Beg built a madrasah in Samarkand, which became the first building in the architectural ensemble of the Registan. Ulugh Beg invited a large number of astronomers and mathematicians from the Islamic world to this madrasa. Under Ulugh Beg, Samarkand became one of the world centres of medieval science. In the first half of the 15th century, a whole scientific school arose around Ulugh Beg, uniting prominent astronomers and mathematicians including Jamshid al-Kashi, Qāḍī Zāda al-Rūmī, and Ali Qushji. Ulugh Beg's main interest in science was astronomy, and he constructed an observatory in 1428. Its main instrument was the wall quadrant, which was unique in the world. It was known as the 'Fakhri Sextant' and had a radius of 40 metres. As seen in the image on the left, the arc was finely constructed, with a staircase on either side to provide access for the assistants who performed the measurements.

=== Uzbek period ===
In 1500, nomadic Uzbek warriors took control of Samarkand. The Shaybanids emerged as the city's leaders at or about this time. In 1501, Samarkand was finally taken by Muhammad Shaybani of the Uzbek Shaybanid dynasty, and the city became part of the newly formed Bukhara Khanate. Samarkand was chosen as the capital of this state, in which Muhammad Shaybani Khan was crowned. In Samarkand, Muhammad Shaybani Khan ordered the construction of a large madrasa, where he later took part in scientific and religious disputes. The first dated record of the Shaybani Khan madrasa dates back to 1504 (it was completely destroyed during the Soviet era). Muhammad Salikh wrote that Shaybani Khan built a madrasa in Samarkand to perpetuate the memory of his brother Mahmud Sultan.

Fazlallah ibn Ruzbihan, in 'Mikhmon-namei Bukhara', expresses his admiration for the majestic building of the madrasa, its gilded roof, high hujras, and spacious courtyard, and quotes a verse praising the madrasa. Zayn ad-Din Vasifi, who visited the Shaybani Khan madrasa several years later, wrote in his memoirs that the veranda, hall, and courtyard of the madrasa are spacious and magnificent.

Abdulatif Khan, the son of Ulugh Beg's grandson Kuchkunji Khan, who ruled in Samarkand from 1540 to 1551, was considered an expert in the history of Transoxiana and the Shibanid dynasty. He patronised poets and scientists. Abdulatif Khan himself wrote poetry under the literary pseudonym Khush.

During the reign of the Ashtarkhanid Imam Quli Khan (1611–1642), famous architectural masterpieces were built in Samarkand. In 1612–1656, the governor of Samarkand, Yalangtush Bahadur, built a cathedral mosque, the Tilakari Madrasa, and the Sherdar Madrasa.

The Zarafshan Water Bridge is a brick bridge built on the left bank of the Zarafshan River, 7–8 km north-east of the centre of Samarkand, built by Shaibani Khan at the beginning of the 16th century.

The city was largely abandoned in the early 1720s, before the Afsharid ruler Nader Shah invaded the region in 1740. From 1599 to 1756, Samarkand was ruled by the Ashtarkhanid branch of the Khanate of Bukhara.

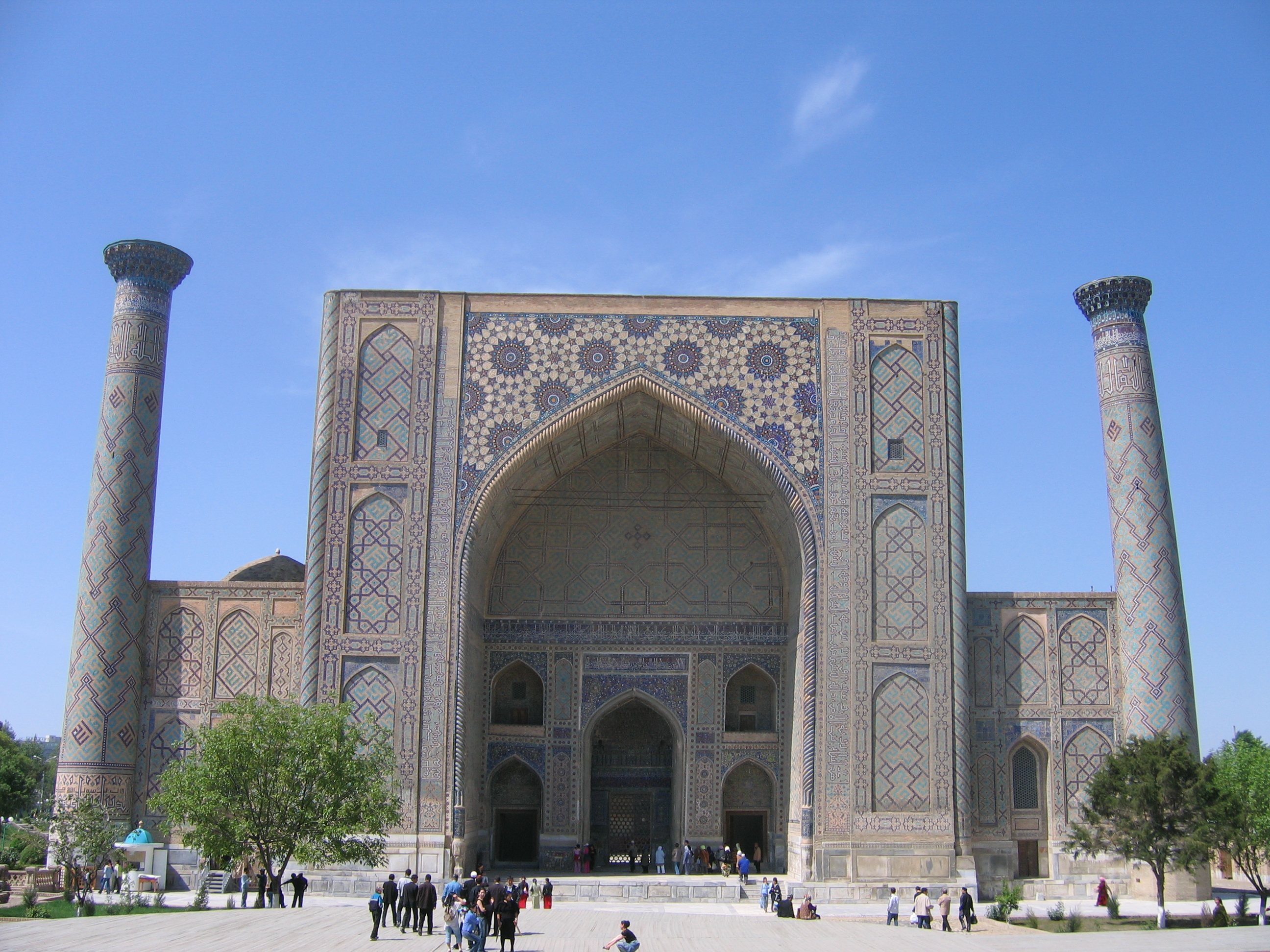
The Ulugh Beg Madrasa

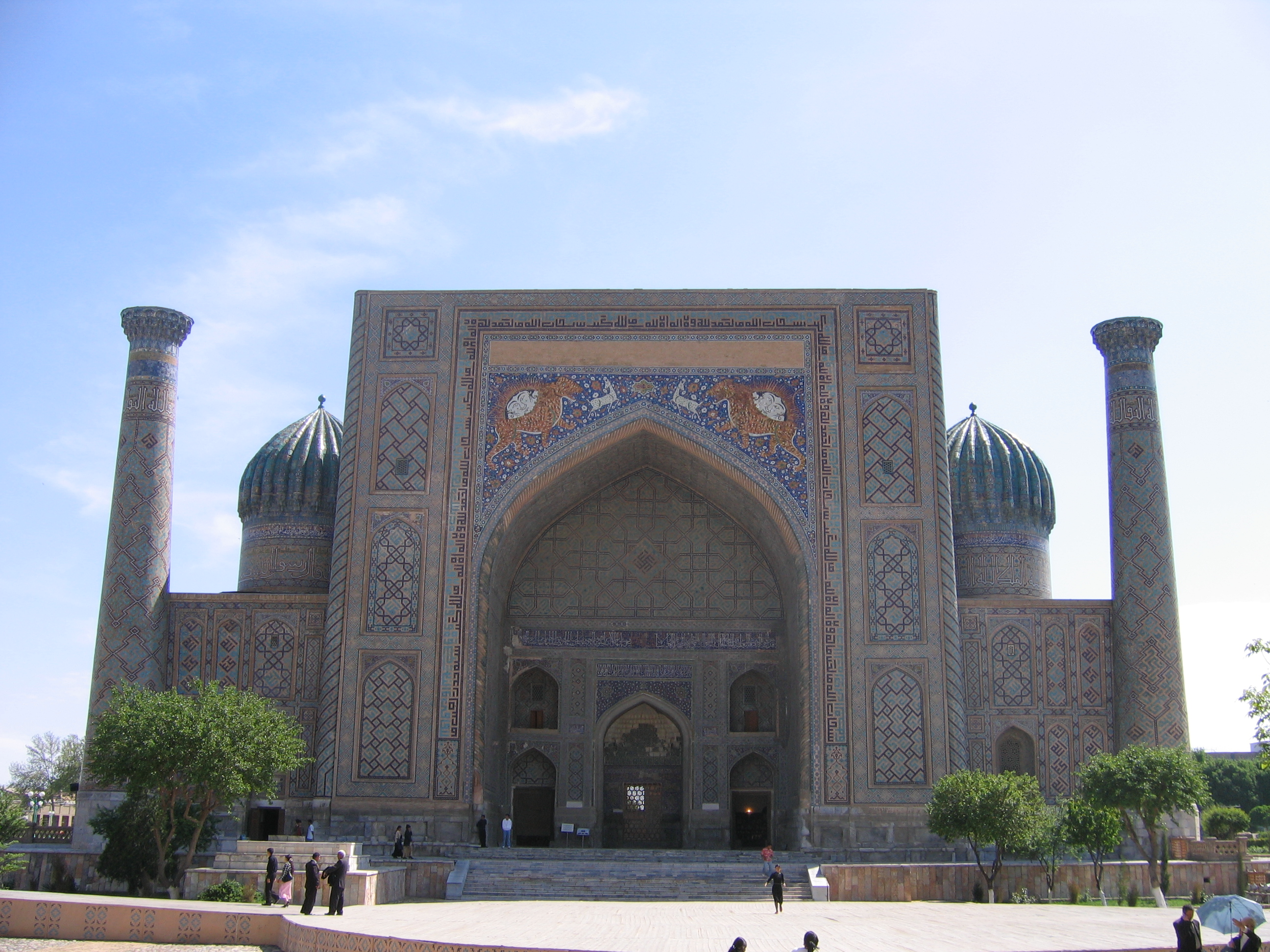
The Sherdar Madrasa

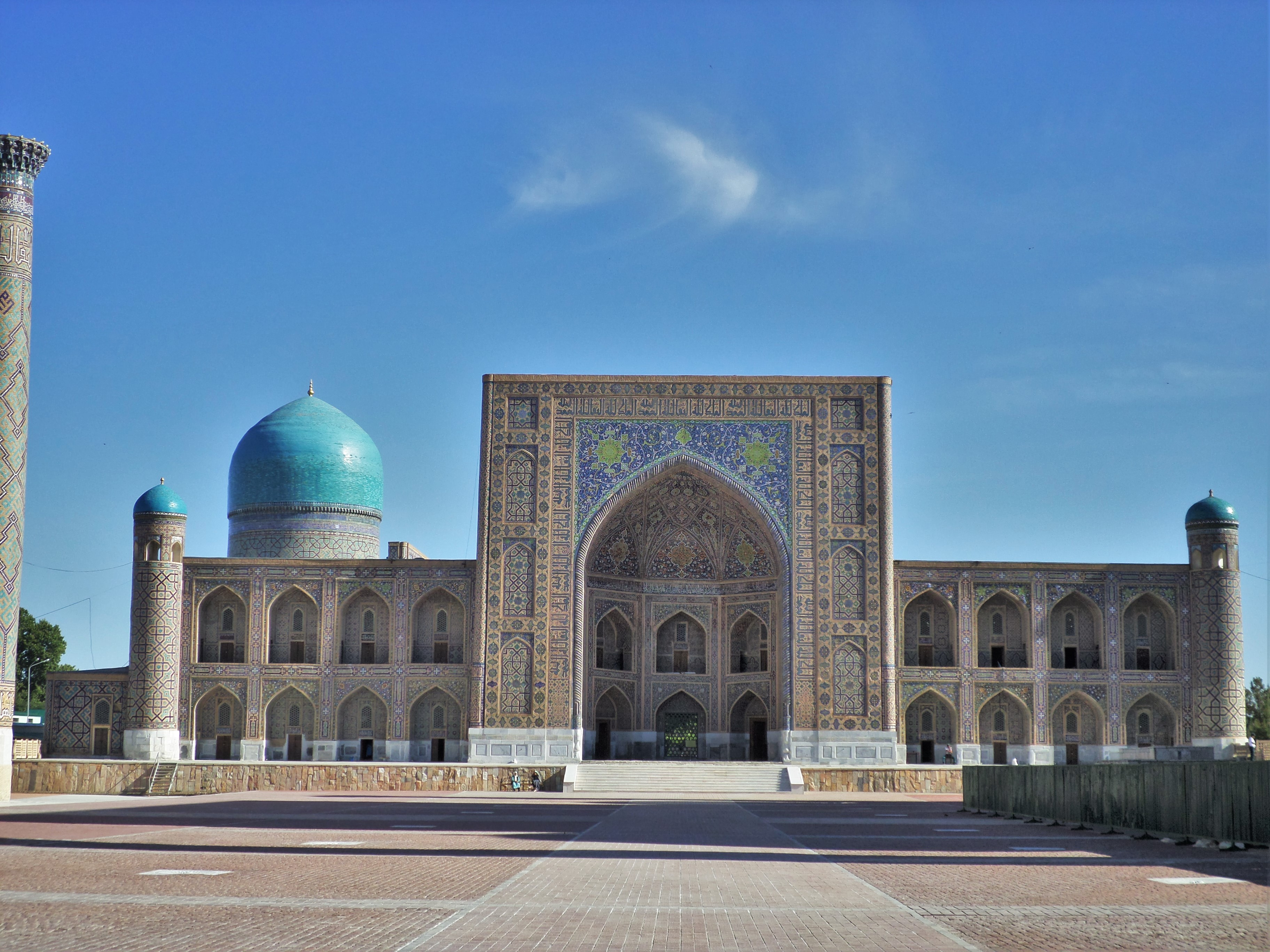
The Tilakari Madrasa

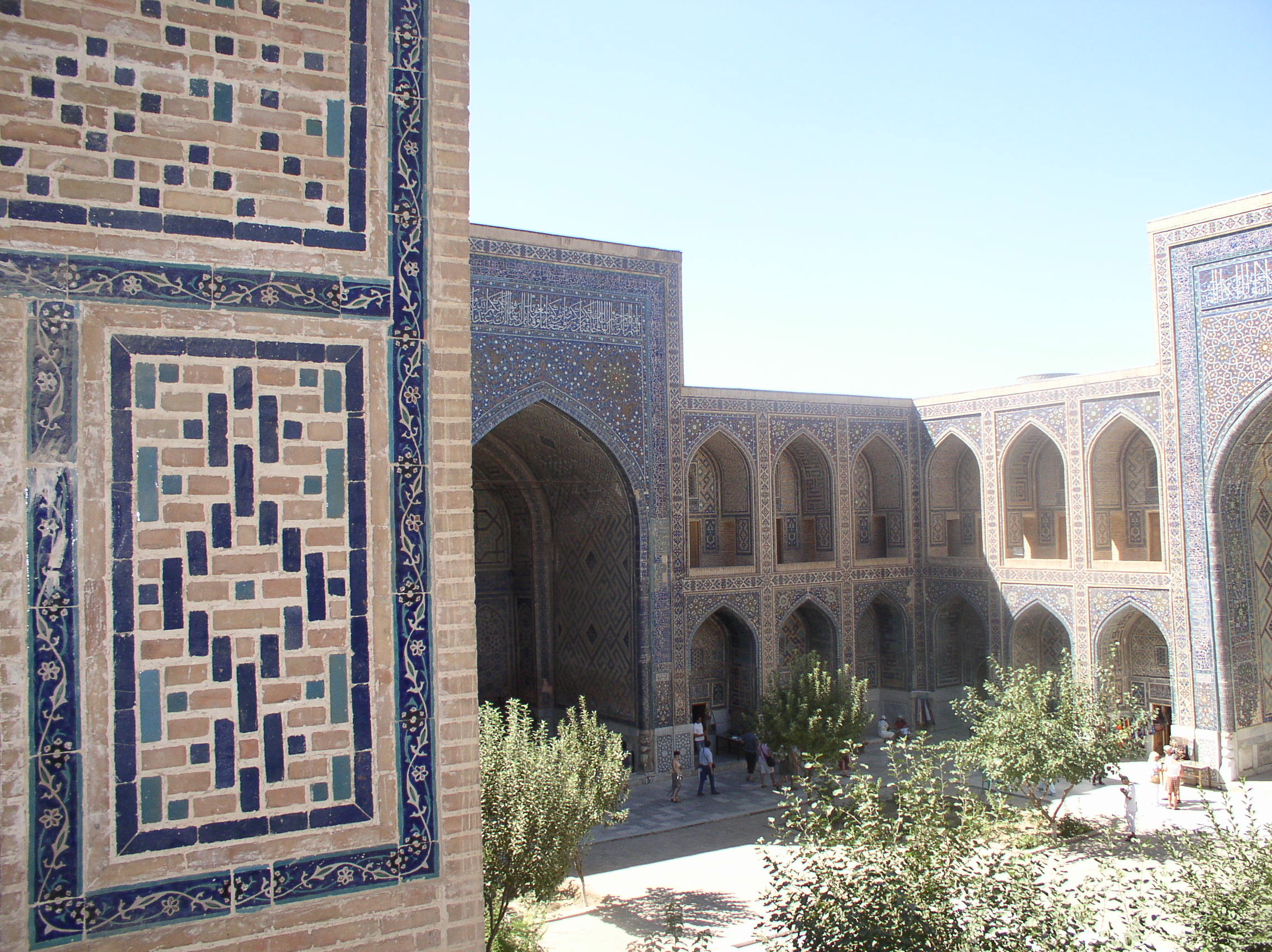
The Ulugh Beg Madrasa's courtyard

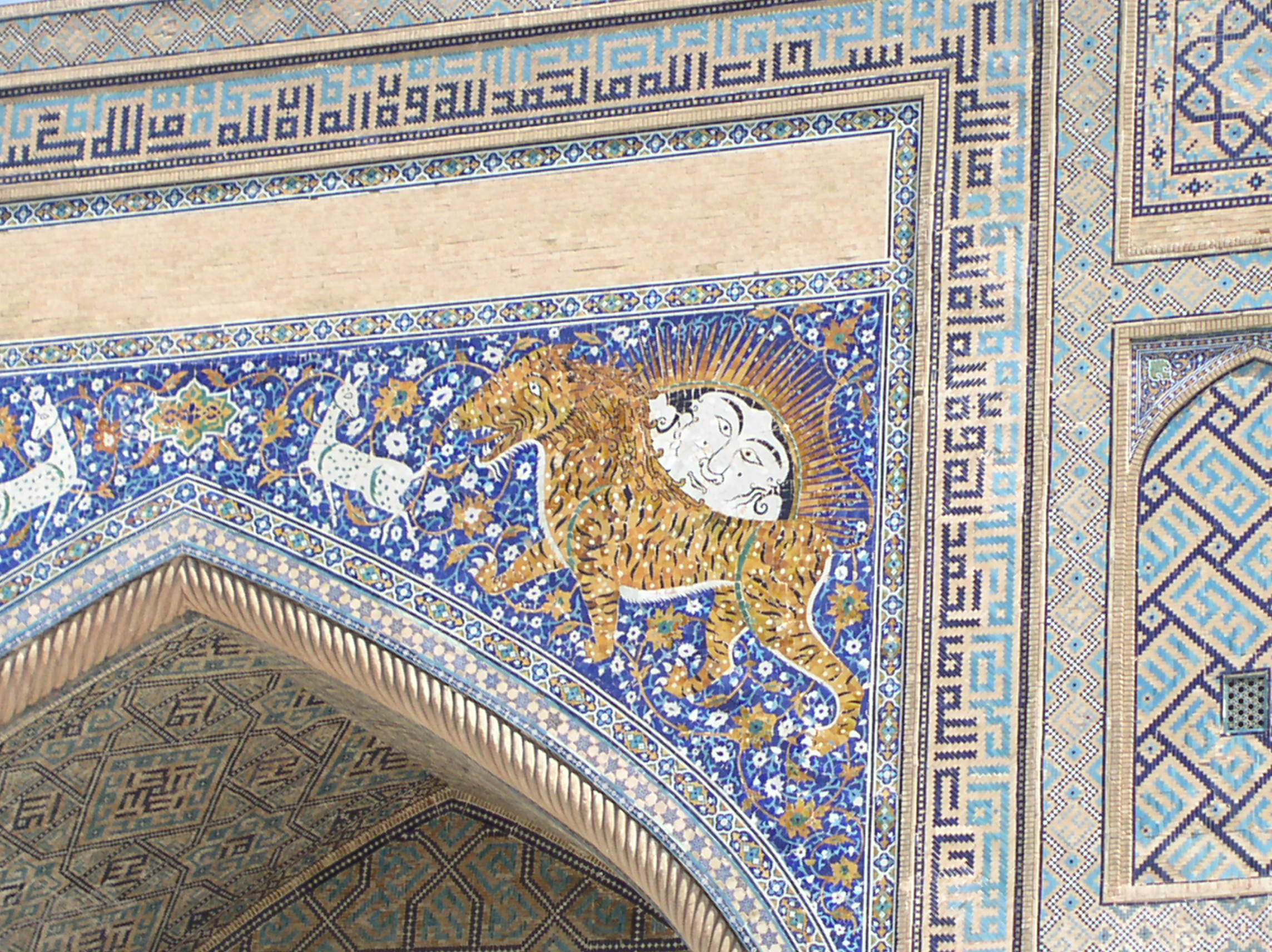
Tiger on the Sherdar Madrasa's iwan

=== Second half of the 18th–19's century Uzbek period ===
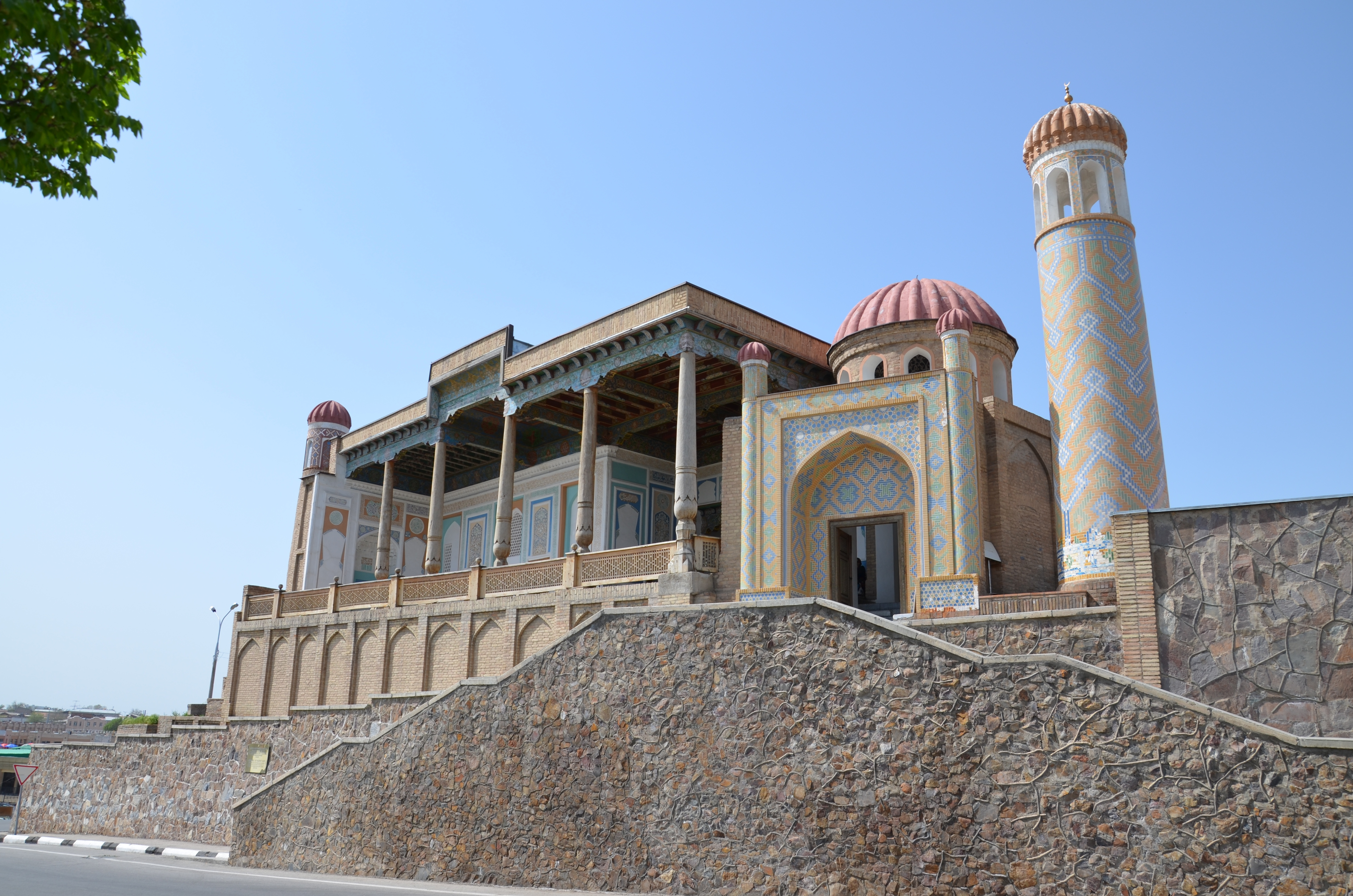
Khazrat Hizr mosque, 1854

From 1756 to 1868, the city was ruled by the Manghud emirs of Bukhara. The revival of the city began during the reign of the founder of the Uzbek Manghud dynasty, Muhammad Rakhim (1756–1758), who became famous for his strength of will and military skill. Muhammad Rakhim Biy made several attempts to revive Samarkand.

=== Russian Empire period ===
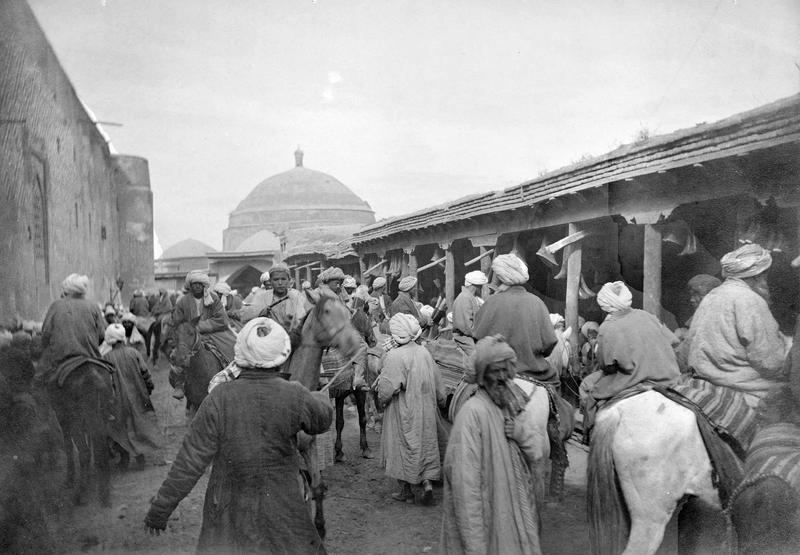
Samarkand in 1890

The city came under imperial Russian rule after the citadel had been taken by a force under General Konstantin Petrovich von Kaufman in 1868. Shortly thereafter the small Russian garrison of 500 men were themselves besieged. The assault, which was led by Abdul Malik Tura, the rebellious elder son of the Bukharan Emir, as well as Baba Beg of Shahrisabz and Jura Beg of Kitab, was repelled with heavy losses. General Alexander Konstantinovich Abramov became the first Governor of the Military Okrug, which the Russians established along the course of the Zeravshan River with Samarkand as the administrative centre. The Russian section of the city was built after this point, largely west of the old city.

In 1886, the city became the capital of the newly formed Samarkand Oblast of Russian Turkestan and regained even more importance when the Trans-Caspian railway reached it in 1888.

=== Soviet period ===
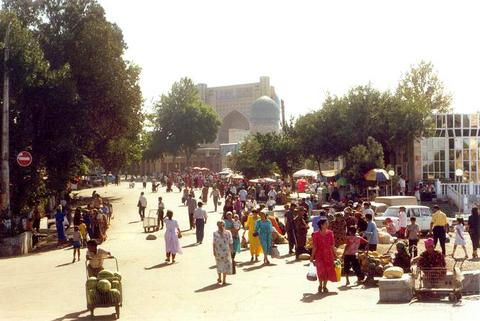
Downtown with Bibi-Khanym Mosque in 1990s

Samarkand was the capital of Turkestan Provisional Government in 1922 and was the capital of the Uzbek SSR from 1925 to 1930, before being replaced by Tashkent. During World War II, after Nazi Germany invaded the Soviet Union, a number of Samarkand's citizens were sent to Smolensk to fight the enemy. Many were taken captive or killed by the Nazis. Additionally, thousands of refugees from the occupied western regions of the USSR fled to the city, and it served as one of the main hubs for the fleeing civilians in the Uzbek Soviet Socialist Republic and the Soviet Union as a whole.

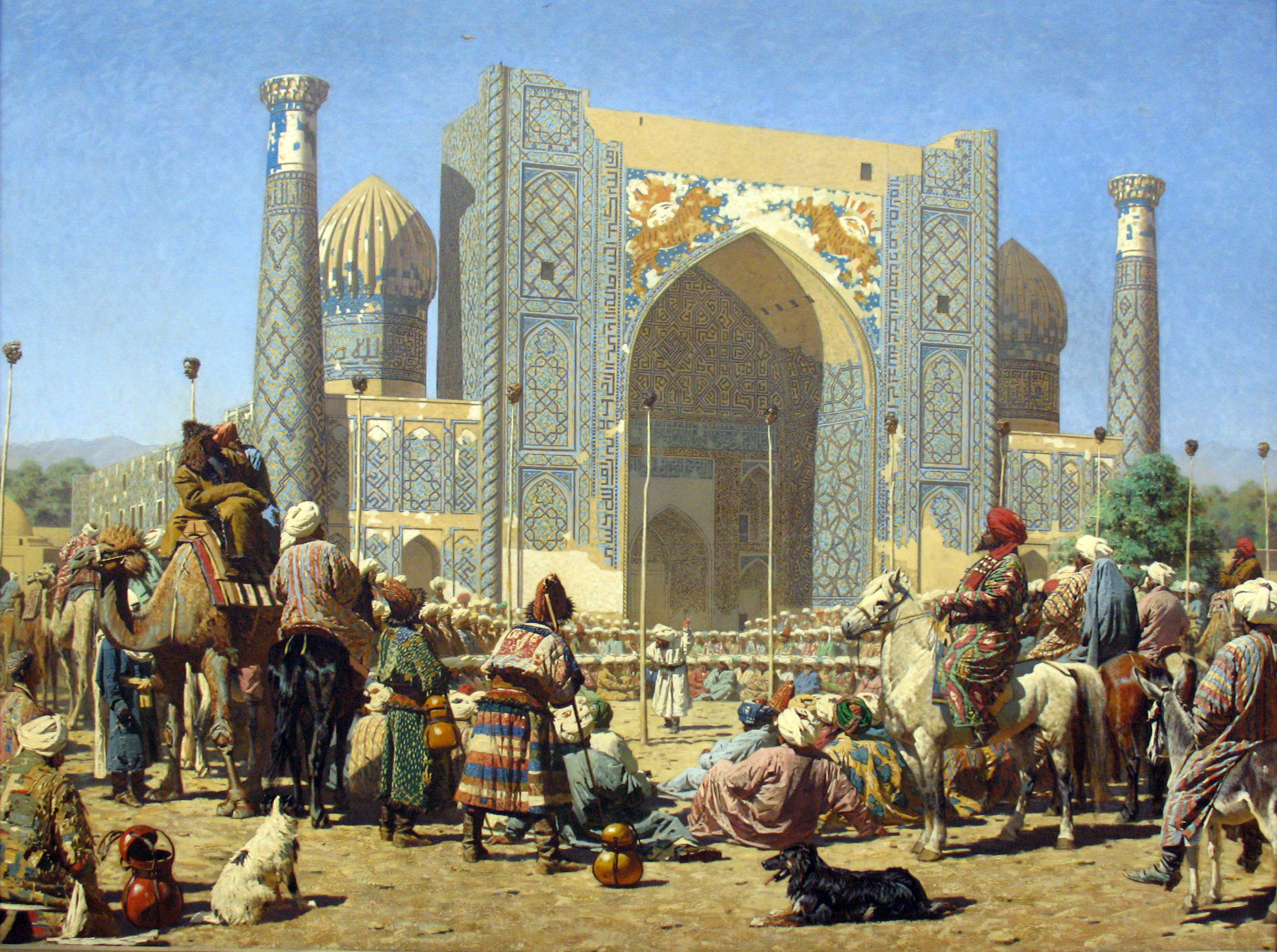
Triumph by Vasily Vereshchagin, depicting the Sherdar Madrasa on the Registan.

European study of the history of Samarkand began after the conquest of Samarkand by the Russian Empire in 1868. The first studies of the history of Samarkand belong to N. Veselovsky, V. Bartold and V. Vyatkin. In the Soviet period, the generalization of materials on the history of Samarkand was reflected in the two-volume History of Samarkand edited by the academician of Uzbekistan Ibrohim Moʻminov.

On the initiative of Academician of the Academy of Sciences of the Uzbek SSR I. Muminov and with the support of Sharaf Rashidov, the 2500th anniversary of Samarkand was widely celebrated in 1970. In this regard, a monument to Ulugh Beg was opened, the Museum of the History of Samarkand was founded, and a two-volume history of Samarkand was prepared and published.

=== After the independence of Uzbekistan ===
After Uzbekistan gained independence, several monographs were published on the ancient and medieval history of Samarkand.

In 2019, the city hosted the first Samarkand Half Marathon. As of 2026, full marathons are also hosted.

On 15 and 16 September 2022, the city hosted the 2022 SCO summit. In September 2026, the city hosted the 2026 Chess Olympiad.

== Geography ==
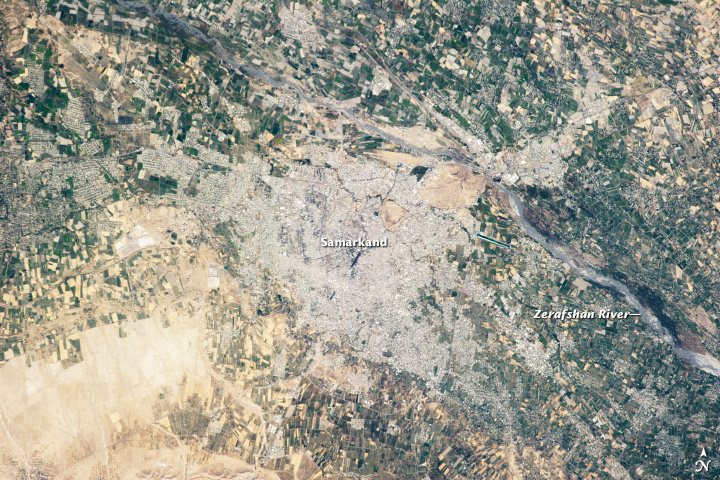
Samarkand from space in September 2013.

Samarkand is located in southeastern Uzbekistan, in the Zarefshan River valley, 135 km from Qarshi. Road M37 connects Samarkand to Bukhara, 240 km away. Road M39 connects it to Tashkent, 270 km away. The Tajikistan border is about 35 km from Samarkand; the Tajik capital Dushanbe is 210 km away from Samarkand. Road M39 connects Samarkand to Mazar-i-Sharif in Afghanistan, which is 340 km away.

=== Climate ===
Samarkand has a cold semi-arid climate (Köppen climate classification: BSk) with hot, dry summers and relatively wet, variable winters that alternate periods of warm weather with periods of cold weather. July and August are the hottest months of the year, with temperatures reaching and exceeding 40 °C (104 °F). Precipitation is sparse from June through October, but increases to a maximum from February to April. January 2008 was particularly cold; the temperature dropped to −22 °C (−8 °F).

Climate data for Samarkand (1991–2020, extremes 1891–present)
Month	Jan	Feb	Mar	Apr	May	Jun	Jul	Aug	Sep	Oct	Nov	Dec	Year
Record high °C (°F)	23.2 (73.8)	26.7 (80.1)	32.2 (90.0)	36.2 (97.2)	39.5 (103.1)	41.6 (106.9)	42.4 (108.3)	41.0 (105.8)	38.6 (101.5)	35.2 (95.4)	31.5 (88.7)	27.5 (81.5)	42.4 (108.3)
Mean daily maximum °C (°F)	7.3 (45.1)	9.5 (49.1)	15.2 (59.4)	21.4 (70.5)	27.0 (80.6)	32.4 (90.3)	34.5 (94.1)	33.3 (91.9)	28.6 (83.5)	22.0 (71.6)	14.4 (57.9)	9.1 (48.4)	21.2 (70.2)
Daily mean °C (°F)	2.3 (36.1)	4.0 (39.2)	9.3 (48.7)	15.2 (59.4)	20.4 (68.7)	25.4 (77.7)	27.2 (81.0)	25.6 (78.1)	20.6 (69.1)	14.1 (57.4)	8.0 (46.4)	3.7 (38.7)	14.7 (58.4)
Mean daily minimum °C (°F)	−1.3 (29.7)	−0.2 (31.6)	4.6 (40.3)	9.7 (49.5)	14.1 (57.4)	18.0 (64.4)	19.5 (67.1)	17.9 (64.2)	13.5 (56.3)	7.8 (46.0)	3.2 (37.8)	−0.2 (31.6)	8.9 (48.0)
Record low °C (°F)	−25.4 (−13.7)	−22 (−8)	−14.9 (5.2)	−6.8 (19.8)	−1.3 (29.7)	4.8 (40.6)	8.6 (47.5)	7.8 (46.0)	0.0 (32.0)	−6.4 (20.5)	−18.1 (−0.6)	−22.8 (−9.0)	−25.4 (−13.7)
Average precipitation mm (inches)	41.1 (1.62)	52.2 (2.06)	73.2 (2.88)	62.9 (2.48)	40.0 (1.57)	6.8 (0.27)	1.6 (0.06)	1.6 (0.06)	2.7 (0.11)	16.0 (0.63)	40.3 (1.59)	39.2 (1.54)	377.6 (14.87)
Average precipitation days (≥ 1.0 mm)	14	13	15	13	11	5	2	2	2	6	10	12	105
Average rainy days	8	10	13	11	9	3	2	1	2	6	8	9	82
Average snowy days	9	7	3	0.3	0.1	0	0	0	0	0.3	2	6	28
Average relative humidity (%)	76	74	70	63	54	42	42	43	47	59	68	74	59
Average dew point °C (°F)	−2 (28)	−1 (30)	2 (36)	6 (43)	9 (48)	9 (48)	10 (50)	9 (48)	6 (43)	4 (39)	2 (36)	−1 (30)	4 (40)
Mean monthly sunshine hours	119.2	130.9	172.2	228.8	297.7	345.5	373.1	358.9	305.9	242.6	150.7	120.2	2,845.7
Average ultraviolet index	2	3	3	4	5	6	6	6	4	3	2	2	4
Source 1: Pogoda.ru.net
Source 2: Weather Atlas (UV), Time and Date (dewpoints, 1985–2015), NOAA

== People ==
According to official reports, a majority of Samarkand's inhabitants are Uzbeks, while many sources refer to the city as majority Tajik, up to 70 percent of the city's population. Tajiks are especially concentrated in the eastern part of the city, where the main architectural landmarks are.

According to various independent sources, Tajiks are Samarkand's majority ethnic group. Ethnic Uzbeks are the second-largest group and are most concentrated in the west of Samarkand. Exact demographic figures are difficult to obtain since some people in Uzbekistan identify as "Uzbek" even though they speak Tajiki as their first language, often because they are registered as Uzbeks by the central government despite their Tajiki language and identity. As explained by Paul Bergne:

During the census of 1926 a significant part of the Tajik population was registered as Uzbek. Thus, for example, in the 1920 census in Samarkand city the Tajiks were recorded as numbering 44,758 and the Uzbeks only 3301. According to the 1926 census, the number of Uzbeks was recorded as 43,364 and the Tajiks as only 10,716. In a series of kishlaks [villages] in the Khojand Okrug, whose population was registered as Tajik in 1920 e.g. in Asht, Kalacha, Akjar i Tajik and others, in the 1926 census they were registered as Uzbeks. Similar facts can be adduced also with regard to Ferghana, Samarkand, and especially the Bukhara oblasts.

Samarkand is also home to large ethnic communities of "Iranis" (the old, Persian-speaking, Shia population of Merv city and oasis, deported en masse to this area in the late 18th century), Russians, Ukrainians, Belarusians, Armenians, Azeris, Tatars, Koreans, Poles, and Germans, all of whom live primarily in the centre and western neighborhoods of the city. These peoples have emigrated to Samarkand since the end of the 19th century, especially during the Soviet Era; by and large, they speak the Russian language.

In the extreme west and southwest of Samarkand is a population of Central Asian Arabs, who mostly speak Uzbek; only a small portion of the older generation speaks Central Asian Arabic. In eastern Samarkand there was once a large mahallah of Bukharian (Central Asian) Jews, but starting in the 1970s, hundreds of thousands of Jews left Uzbekistan for Israel, United States, Canada, Australia, and Europe. Only a few Jewish families are left in Samarkand today.

Also in the eastern part of Samarkand there are several quarters where Central Asian "Gypsies" (Lyuli, Djugi, Parya, and other groups) live. These peoples began to arrive in Samarkand several centuries ago from what are now India and Pakistan. They mainly speak a dialect of the Tajik language, as well as their own languages, most notably Parya.

=== Language ===
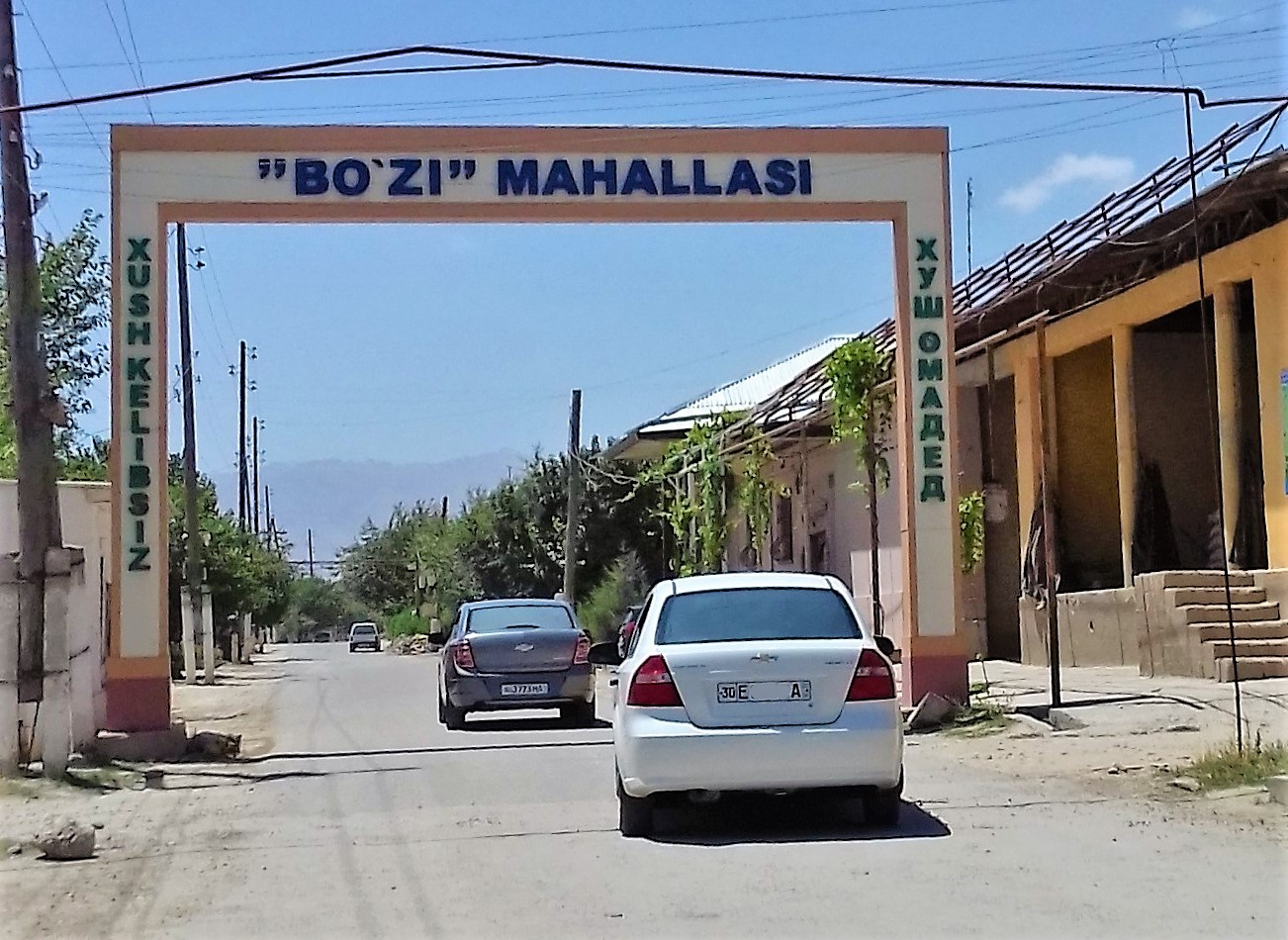
Greeting in two languages: Uzbek (Latin) and Tajik (Cyrillic) at the entrance to one of the mahallahs (Bo'zi) of Samarkand

The state and official language in Samarkand, as in all Uzbekistan, is the Uzbek language. Uzbek is one of the Turkic languages and the mother tongue of Uzbeks, Turkmens, Samarkandian Iranians, and most Samarkandian Arabs living in Samarkand.

As in the rest of Uzbekistan, the Russian language is the de facto second official language in Samarkand, and about 5% of signs and inscriptions in Samarkand are in this language. Russians, Belarusians, Poles, Germans, Koreans, the majority of Ukrainians, the majority of Armenians, Greeks, some Tatars, and some Azerbaijanis in Samarkand speak Russian. Several Russian-language newspapers are published in Samarkand, the most popular of which is Samarkandskiy vestnik (Russian: Самаркандский вестник, lit. the Samarkand Herald). The Samarkandian TV channel STV conducts some broadcasts in Russian.

De facto, the most common native language in Samarkand is Tajik, which is a dialect or variant of the Persian language. Samarkand was one of the cities in which the Persian language developed. Many classical Persian poets and writers lived in or visited Samarkand over the millennia, the most famous being Abulqasem Ferdowsi, Omar Khayyam, Abdurahman Jami, Abu Abdullah Rudaki, Suzani Samarqandi, and Kamal Khujandi.

While the official stance is that Uzbek is the most common language in Samarkand, some data indicate that only about 30% of residents speak it as a native tongue. For the other 70%, Tajik is the native tongue, with Uzbek the second language and Russian the third. However, as no population census was taken in Uzbekistan between 1989 and 2026, there are no accurate data on this matter. Despite Tajik being the second most common language in Samarkand, it does not enjoy the status of an official or regional language. Nevertheless, at Samarkand State University ten faculties offer courses in Tajiki, and the Tajik Language and Literature Department has an enrolment of over 170 students. Only one newspaper in Samarkand is published in Tajiki, in the Cyrillic Tajik alphabet: Ovozi Samarqand (Tajik: Овози Самарқанд —Voice of Samarkand). Local Samarkandian STV and "Samarkand" TV channels offer some broadcasts in Tajik, as does one regional radio station. In 2022 a quarterly literary magazine in Tajiki, Durdonai Sharq, was launched in Samarkand.

In addition to Uzbek, Tajik, and Russian, native languages spoken in Samarkand include Ukrainian, Armenian, Azerbaijani, Tatar, Crimean Tatar, Arabic (for a very small percentage of Samarkandian Arabs), and others.

== Religion ==
=== Islam ===
Islam entered Samarkand in the 8th century, during the invasion of the Arabs in Central Asia (Umayyad Caliphate). Before that, almost all inhabitants of Samarkand were Zoroastrians, and many Nestorians and Buddhists also lived in the city. From that point forward, throughout the reigns of many Muslim governing powers, numerous mosques, madrasahs, minarets, shrines, and mausoleums were built in the city. Many have been preserved. For example, there is the Shrine of Imam Bukhari, an Islamic scholar who authored the hadith collection known as Sahih al-Bukhari, which Sunni Muslims regard as one of the most authentic (sahih) hadith collections. His other books included Al-Adab al-Mufrad. Samarkand is also home to the Shrine of Imam Maturidi, the founder of Maturidism and the Mausoleum of the Prophet Daniel, who is revered in Islam, Judaism, and Christianity.

Most inhabitants of Samarkand are Muslim, primarily Sunni (mostly Hanafi) and Sufi. Approximately 80–85% of Muslims in the city are Sunni, comprising almost all Tajiks, Uzbeks, and Samarkandian Arabs living therein. Samarkand's best-known Islamic sacred lineages are the descendants of Sufi leaders such as Khodja Akhror Wali (1404–1490) and Makhdumi A'zam (1461–1542), the descendants of Sayyid Ata (first half of 14th c.) and Mirakoni Khojas (Sayyids from Mirakon, a village in Iran). The liberal policy of President Shavkat Mirziyoyev opened up new opportunities for the expression of the religious identity. In Samarkand, since 2018, there has been an increase in the number of women wearing the hijab. In Samarkand, the female saint Bibi Seshanba constitutes a female ritual space where religious authority, kinship, and mutual support are reproduced through food, prayer, and material exchanges. Often performed after weddings, the ritual integrates family transitions into a shared moral and sacred order. Bibi Seshanba offers a lens through which to examine negotiations over gender, religious legitimacy, and social distinction in contemporary Samarkand.

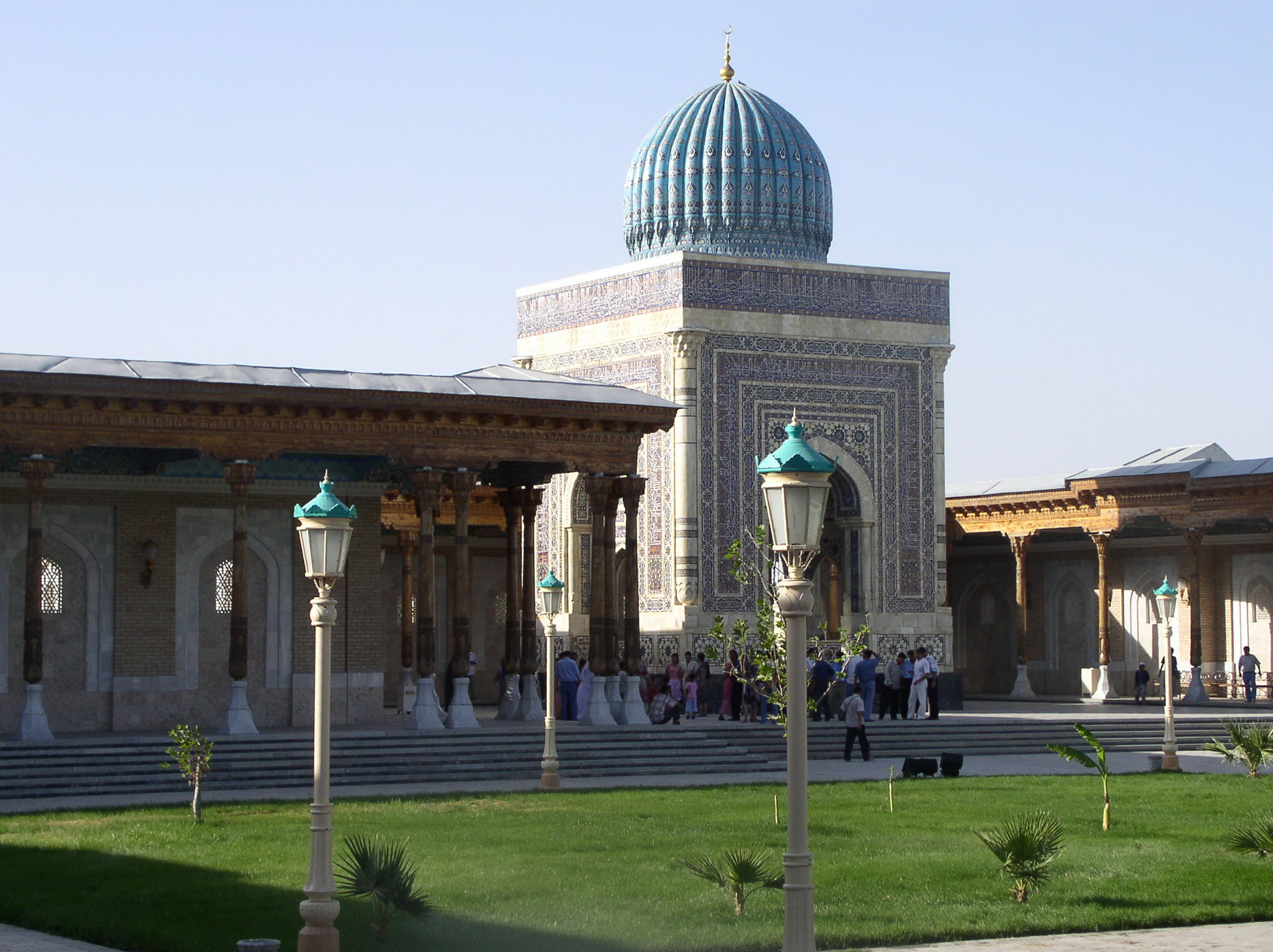
Imam Bukhari Shrine

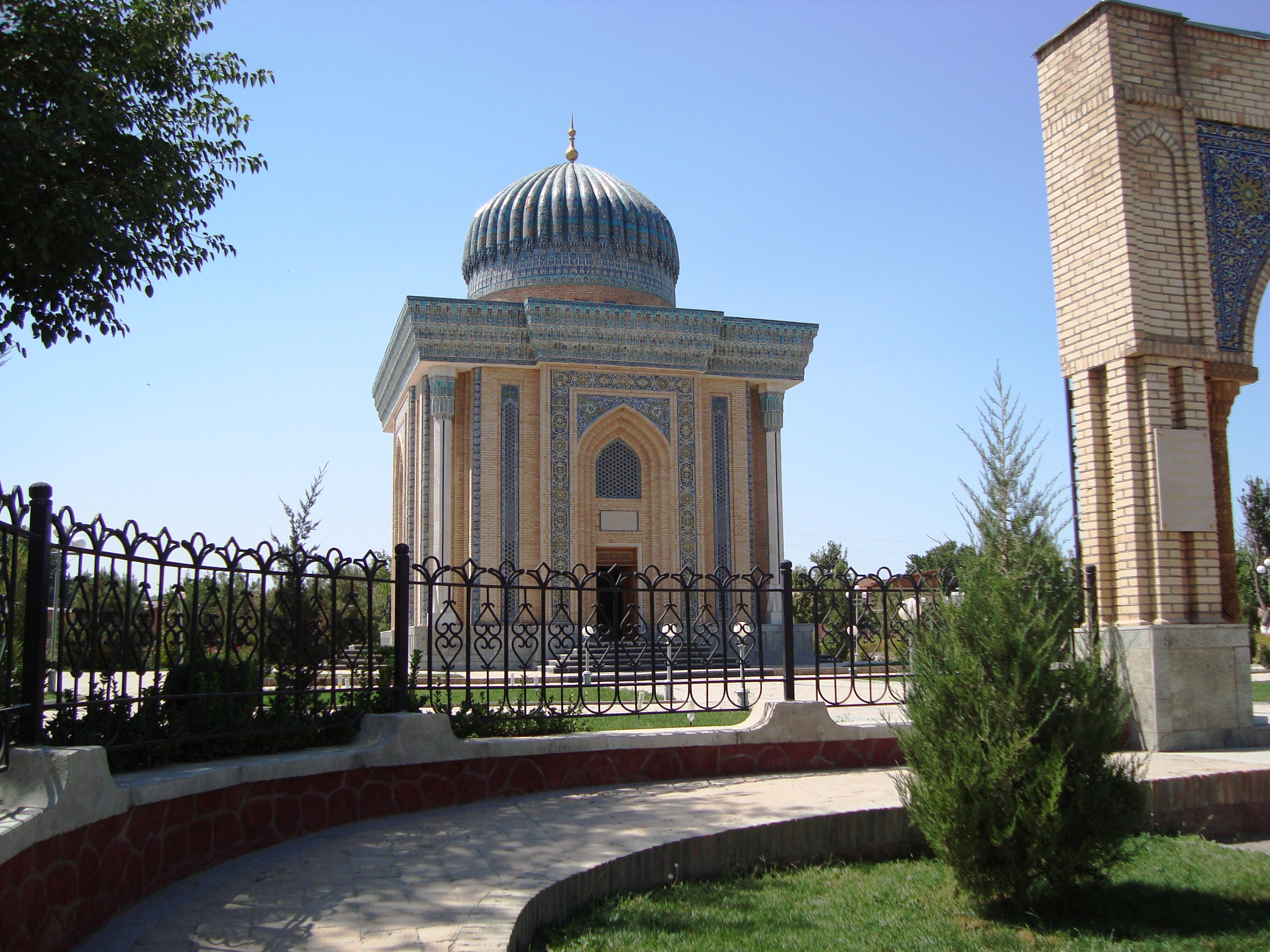
Imam Maturidi Shrine

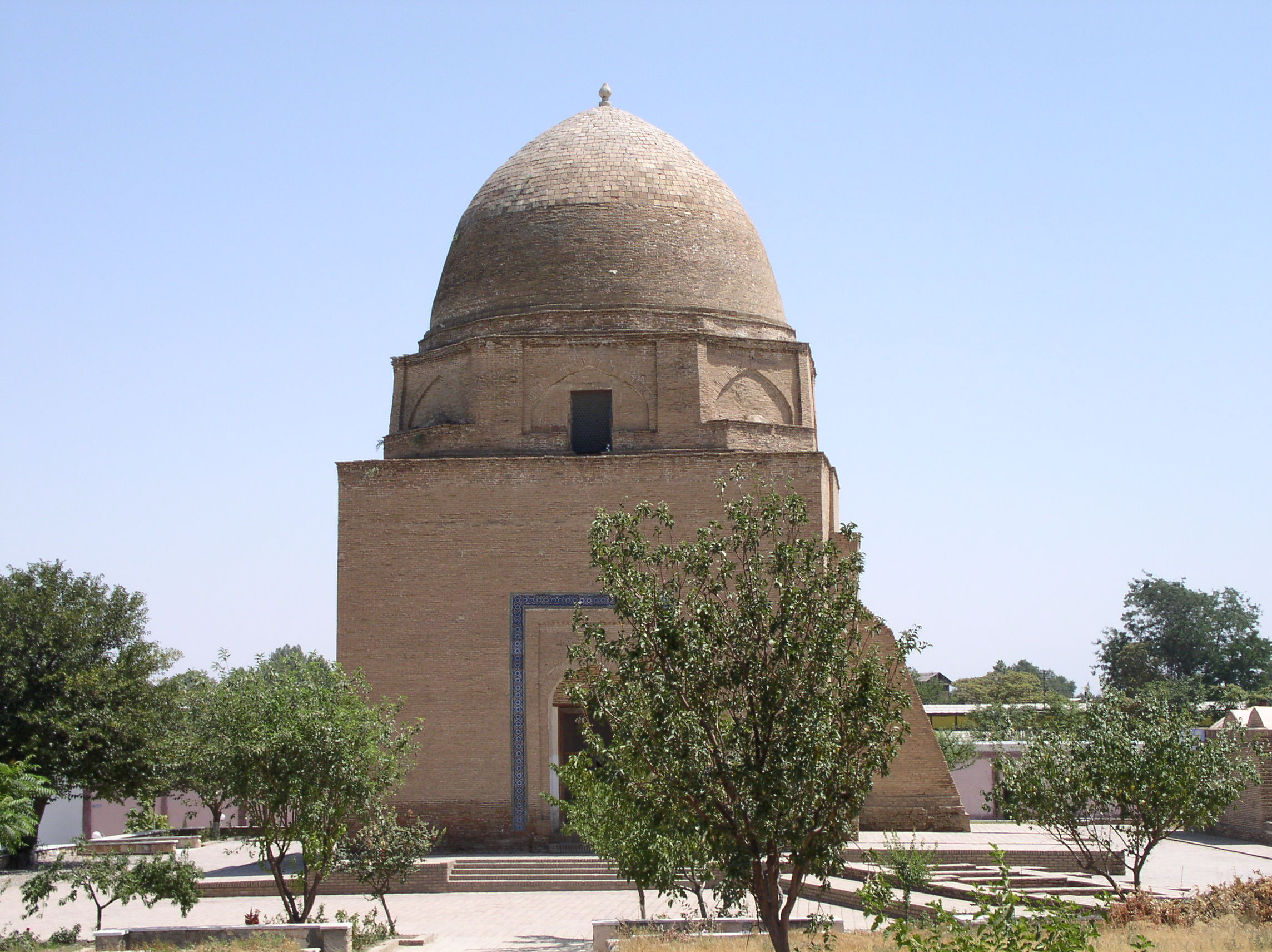
Ruhabad Mausoleum

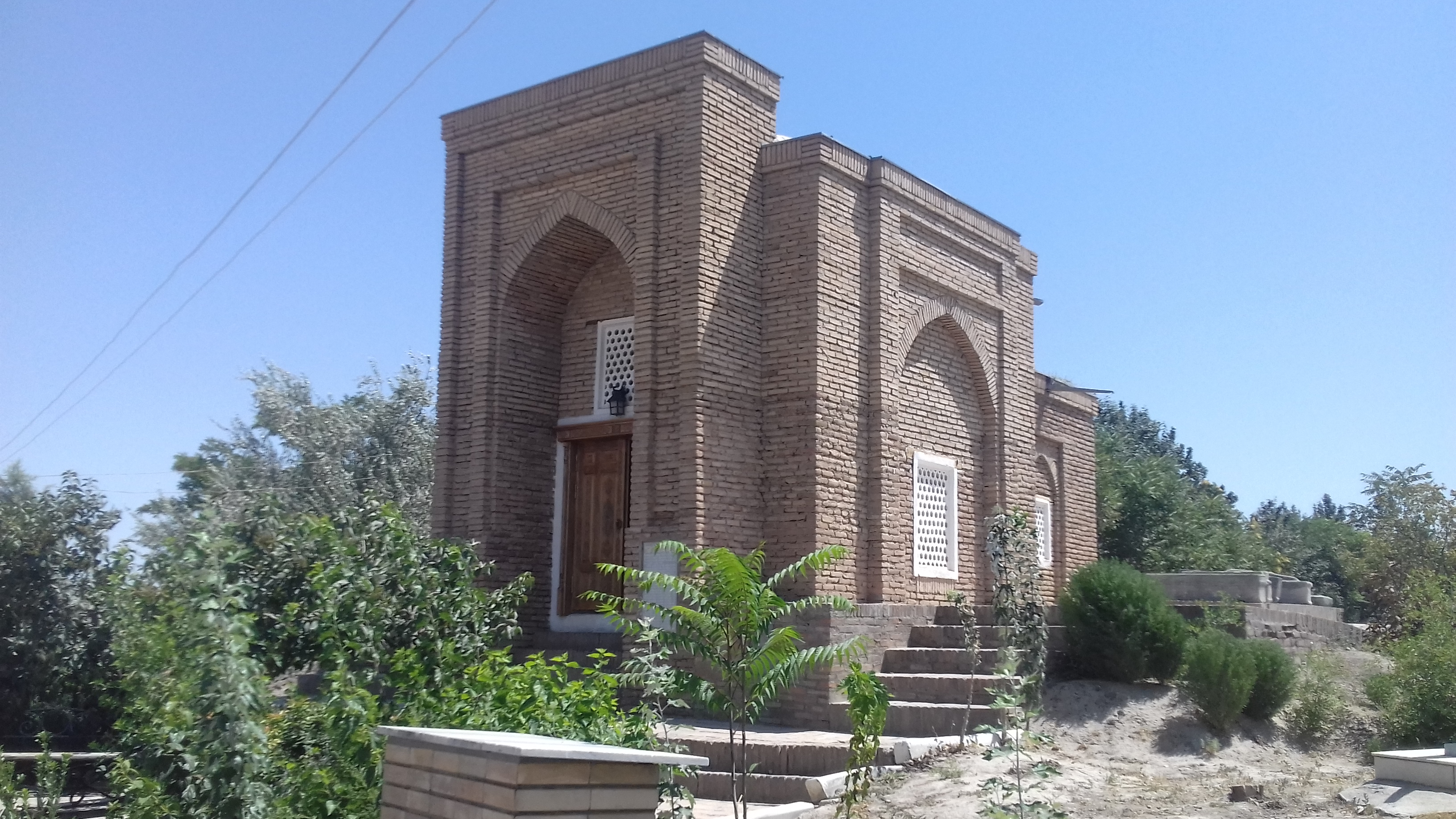
Nuriddin Basir Shrine

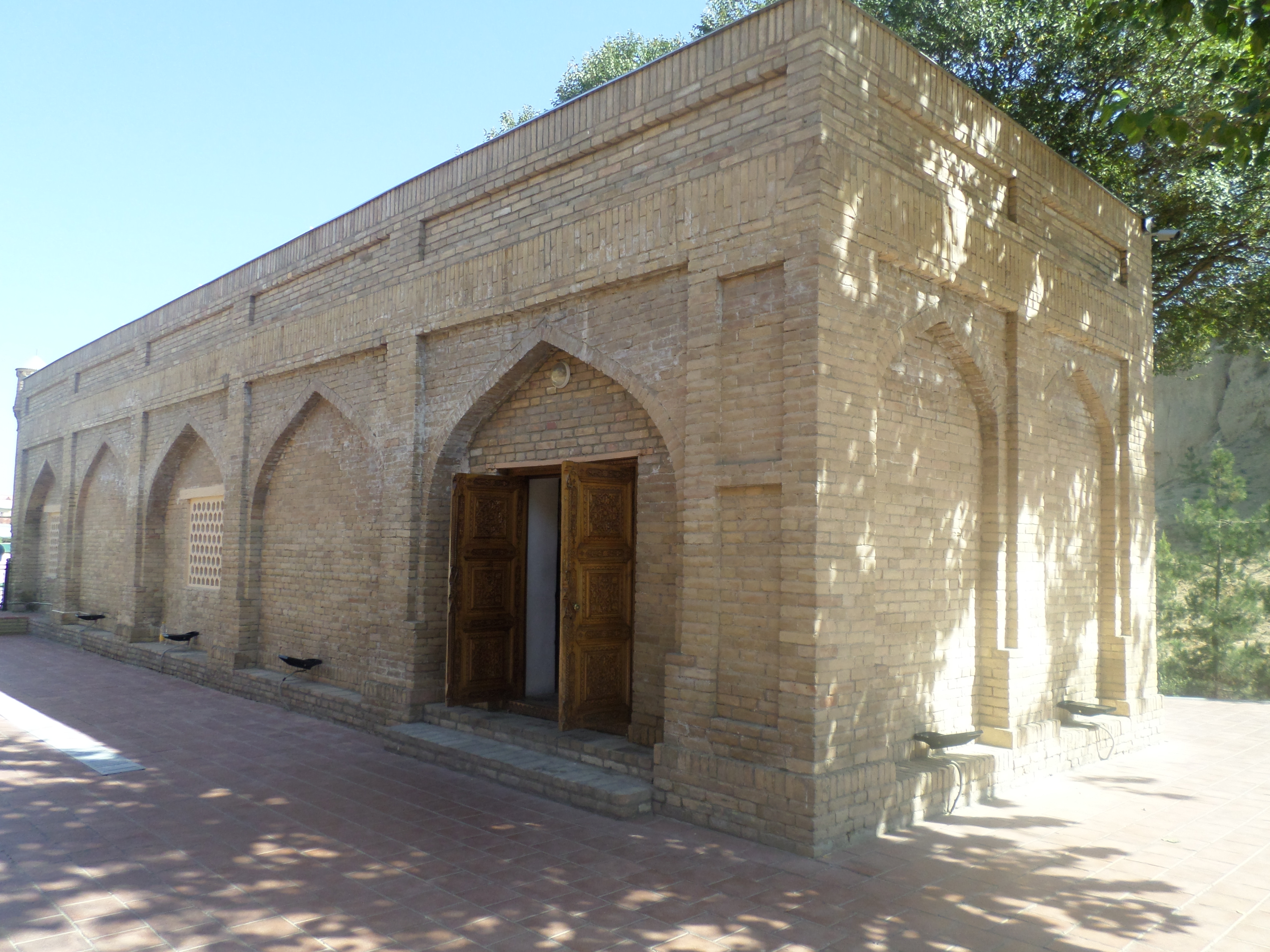
Khoja Daniyar Mausoleum

==== Shia Muslims ====
The Samarqand Vilayat is one of the two regions of Uzbekistan (along with Bukhara Vilayat) that are home to a large number of Shiites. The total population of the Samarkand Vilayat is more than 3,720,000 people (2019).

There are no exact data on the number of Shiites in the city of Samarkand, but the city has several Shiite mosques and madrasas. The largest of these are the Punjabi Mosque, the Punjabi Madrassah, and the Mausoleum of Mourad Avliya. Every year, the Shiites of Samarkand commemorate Ashura, as well as other memorable Shiite dates and holidays.

Shiites in Samarkand are mostly Samarkandian Iranians, who call themselves Irani. Their ancestors began to arrive in Samarkand in the 18th century. Some migrated there in search of a better life, others were sold as slaves there by Turkmen captors, and others were soldiers who were posted to Samarkand. Mostly they came from Khorasan, Mashhad, Sabzevar, Nishapur, and Merv; and secondarily from Iranian Azerbaijan, Zanjan, Tabriz, and Ardabil. Samarkandian Shiites also include Azerbaijanis, as well as small numbers of Tajiks and Uzbeks.

While there are no official data on the total number of Shiites in Uzbekistan, they are estimated to be "several hundred thousand." According to leaked diplomatic cables, in 2007–2008, the US Ambassador for International Religious Freedom held a series of meetings with Sunni mullahs and Shiite imams in Uzbekistan. During one of the talks, the imam of the Shiite mosque in Bukhara said that about 300,000 Shiites live in the Bukhara Vilayat and 1 million in the Samarkand Vilayat. The Ambassador slightly doubted the authenticity of these figures, emphasizing in his report that data on the numbers of religious and ethnic minorities provided by the government of Uzbekistan were considered a very "delicate topic" due to their potential to provoke interethnic and interreligious conflicts. All the ambassadors of the ambassador tried to emphasize that traditional Islam, especially Sufism and Sunnism, in the regions of Bukhara and Samarkand is characterized by great religious tolerance toward other religions and sects, including Shiism.

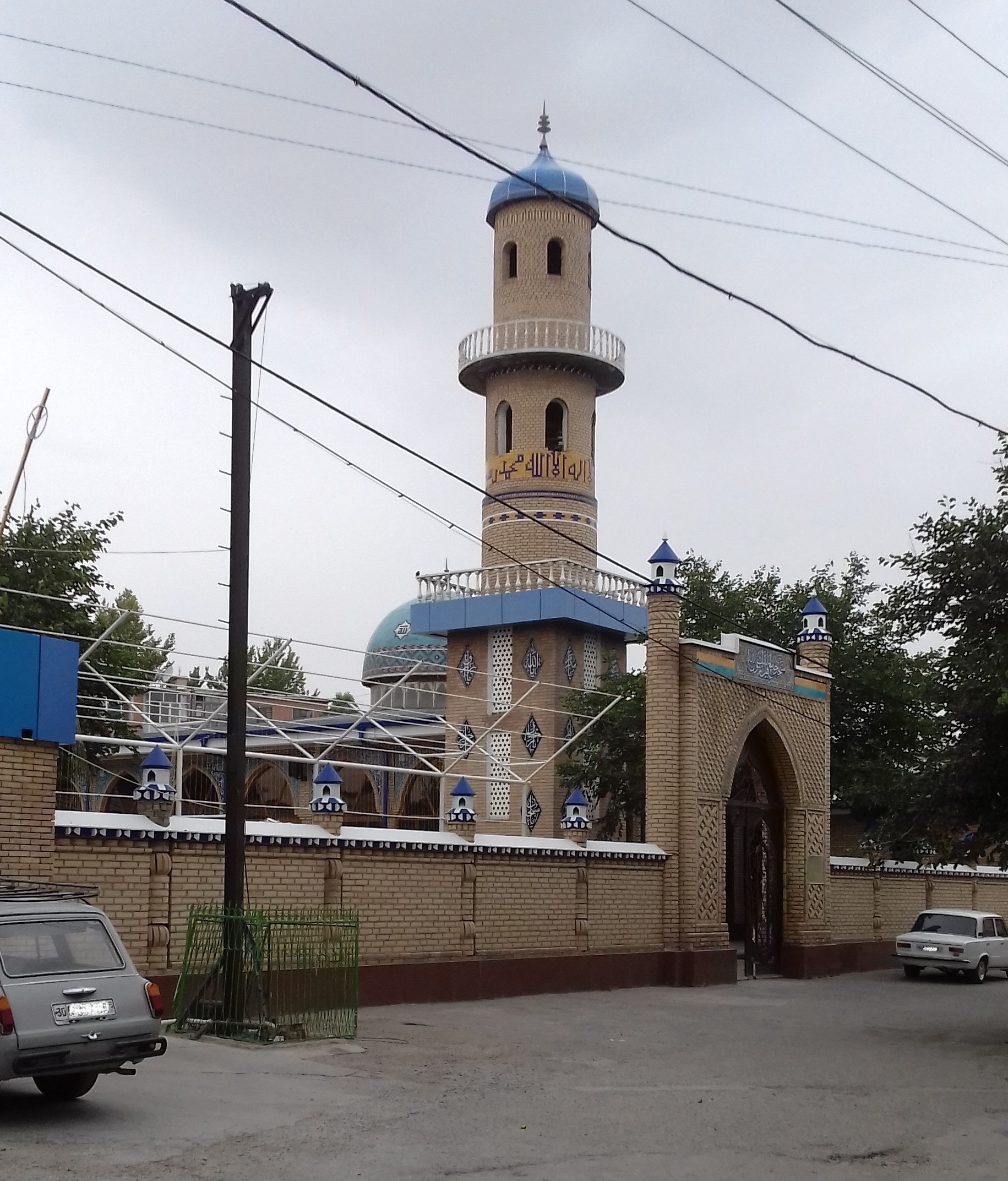
Panjab Shia Mosque

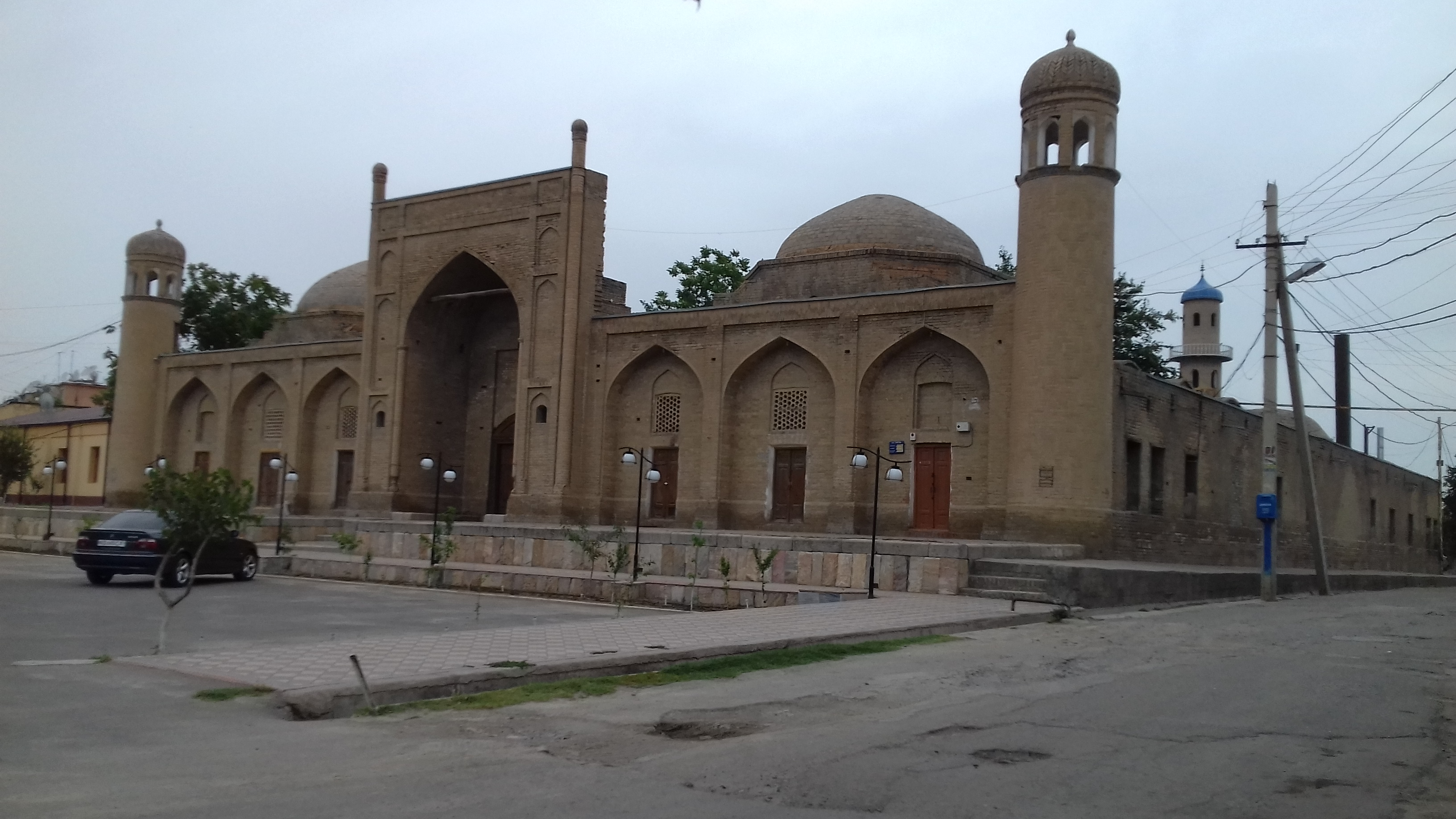
Panjab Shia Madrasa

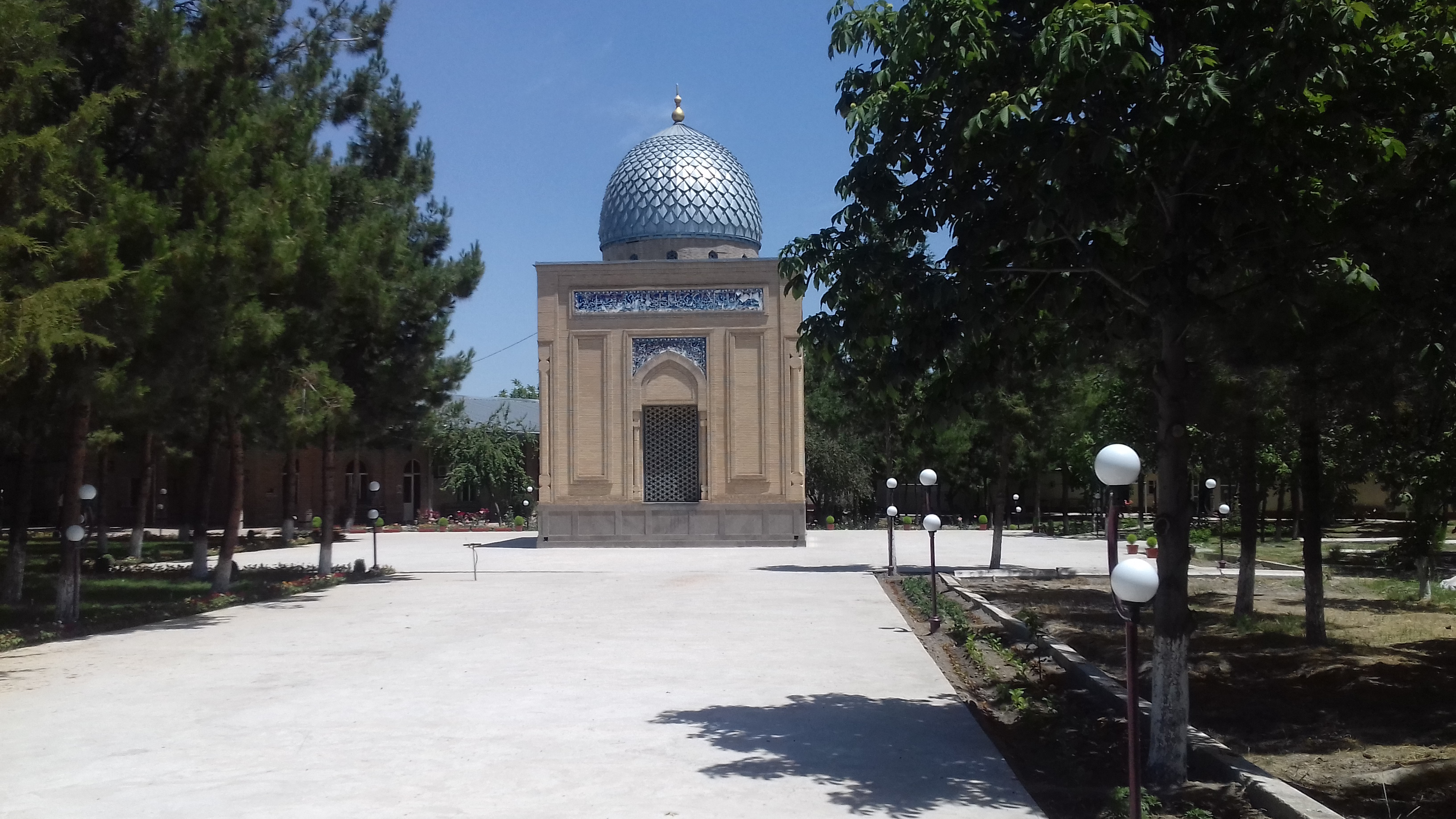
Murad Avliya Shrine

=== Christianity ===
Provinces of the Church of the East in 10th century

Christianity was introduced to Samarkand when it was part of Sogdiana, long before the penetration of Islam into Central Asia. The city then became one of the centers of Nestorianism in Central Asia. The majority of the population were then Zoroastrians, but since Samarkand was the crossroads of trade routes among China, Persia, and Europe, it was religiously tolerant. Under the Umayyad Caliphate, Zoroastrians and Nestorians were persecuted by the Arab conquerors; the survivors fled to other places or converted to Islam. Several Nestorian temples were built in Samarkand, but they have not survived. Their remains were found by archeologists at the ancient site of Afrasiyab and on the outskirts of Samarkand.

In the three decades of 1329–1359, the Samarkand eparchy of the Roman Catholic Church served several thousand Catholics who lived in the city. According to Marco Polo and Johann Elemosina, a descendant of Chaghatai Khan, the founder of the Chaghatai dynasty, Eljigidey, converted to Christianity and was baptized. With the assistance of Eljigidey, the Catholic Church of St. John the Baptist was built in Samarkand. After a while, however, Islam completely supplanted Catholicism.

Christianity reappeared in Samarkand several centuries later, from the mid-19th century onward, after the city was seized by the Russian Empire. Russian Orthodoxy was introduced to Samarkand in 1868, and several churches and temples were built. In the early 20th century several more Orthodox cathedrals, churches, and temples were built, most of which were demolished while Samarkand was part of the USSR.

In present time, Christianity is the second-largest religious group in Samarkand with the predominant form is the Russian Orthodox Church (Moscow Patriarchate). More than 5% of Samarkand residents are Orthodox, mostly Russians, Ukrainians, and Belarusians, and also some Koreans and Greeks. Samarkand is the center of the Samarkand branch (which includes the Samarkand, Qashqadarya, and Surkhandarya provinces of Uzbekistan) of the Uzbekistan and Tashkent eparchy of the Central Asian Metropolitan District of the Russian Orthodox Church of the Moscow Patriarchate. The city has several active Orthodox churches: Cathedral of St. Alexiy Moscowskiy, Church of the Intercession of the Holy Virgin, and Church of St. George the Victorious. There are also a number of inactive Orthodox churches and temples, for example that of Church of St. George Pobedonosets.

There are also a few tens of thousands of Catholics in Samarkand, mostly Poles, Germans, and some Ukrainians. In the center of Samarkand is St. John the Baptist Catholic Church, which was built at the beginning of the 20th century. Samarkand is part of the Apostolic Administration of Uzbekistan.

The third largest Christian sect in Samarkand is the Armenian Apostolic Church, followed by a few tens of thousands of Armenian Samarkandians. Armenian Christians began emigrating to Samarkand at the end of the 19th century, this flow increasing especially in the Soviet era. In the west of Samarkand is the Armenian Church Surb Astvatsatsin.

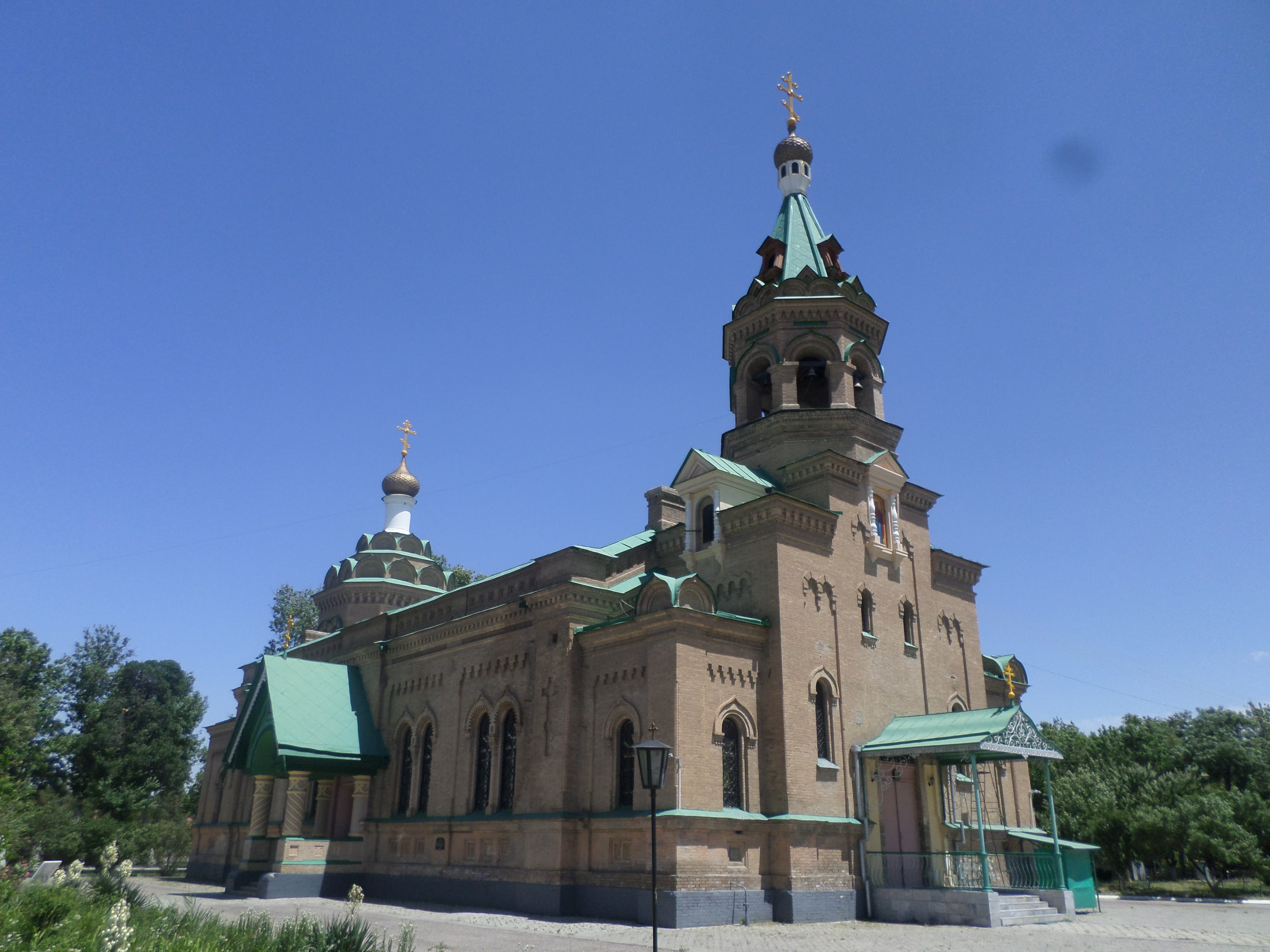
Orthodox Cathedral of St. Alexiy Moscowskiy

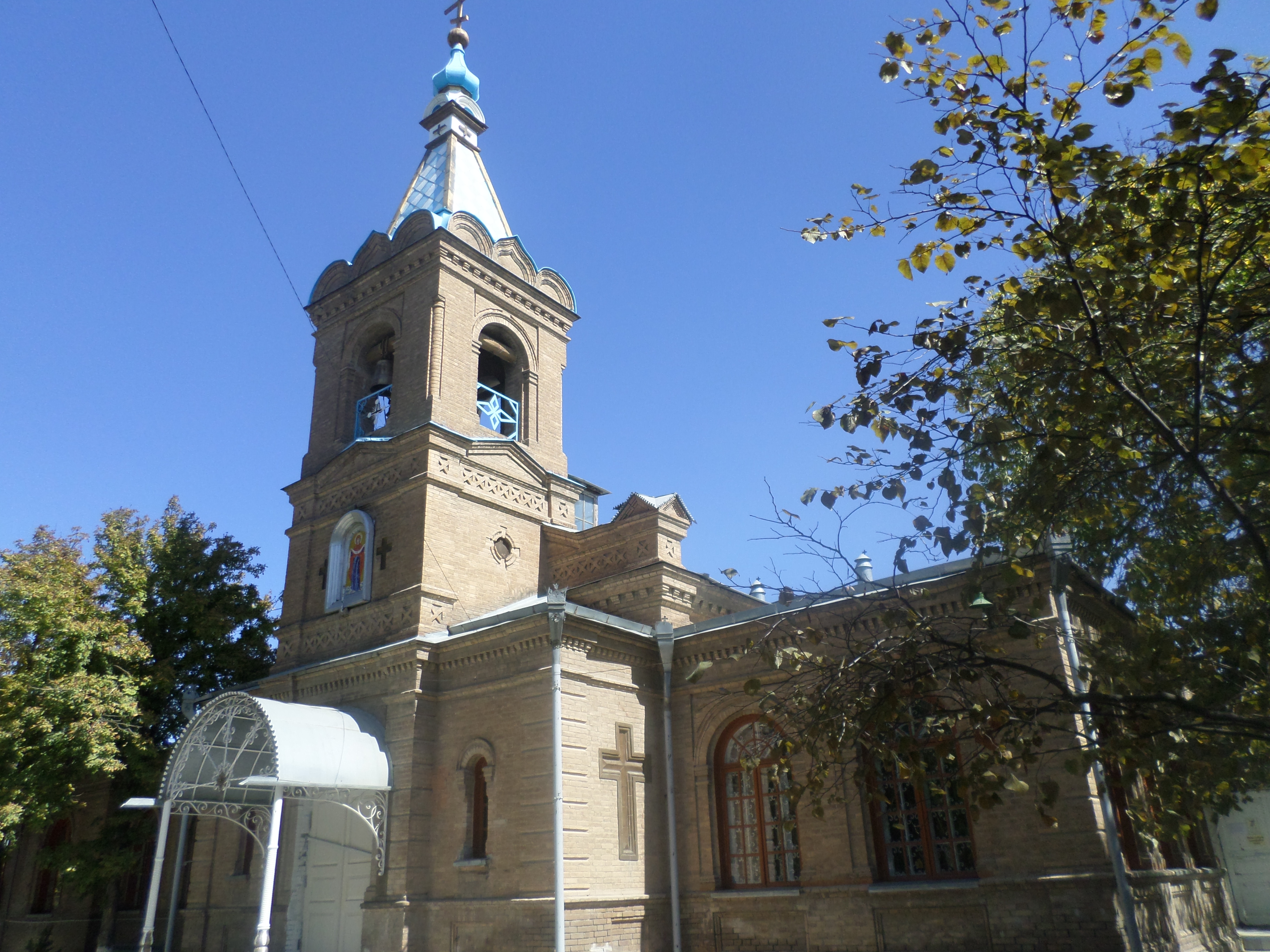
Orthodox Church of the Intercession of the Holy Virgin

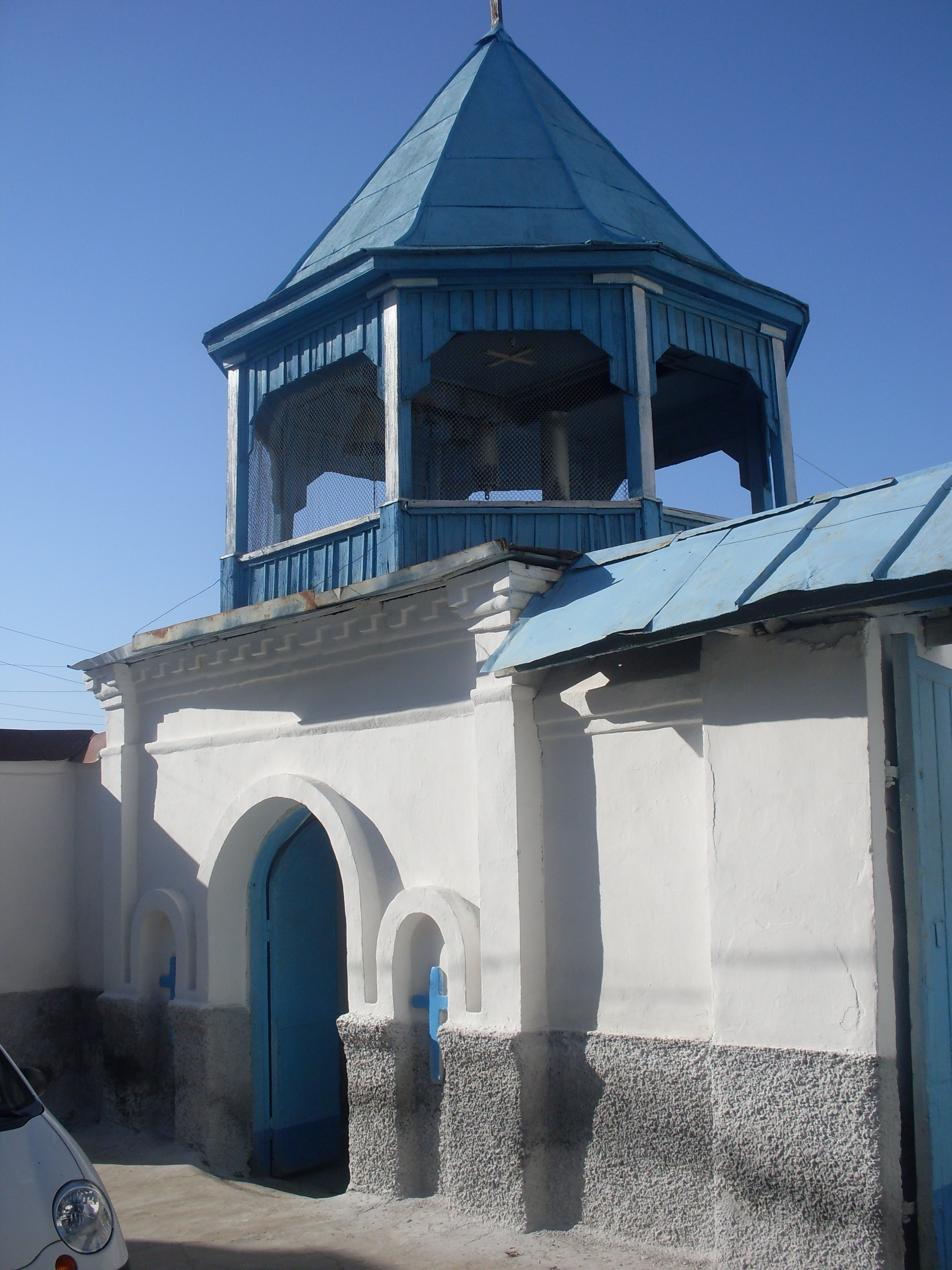
Orthodox Church of St. George the Victorious

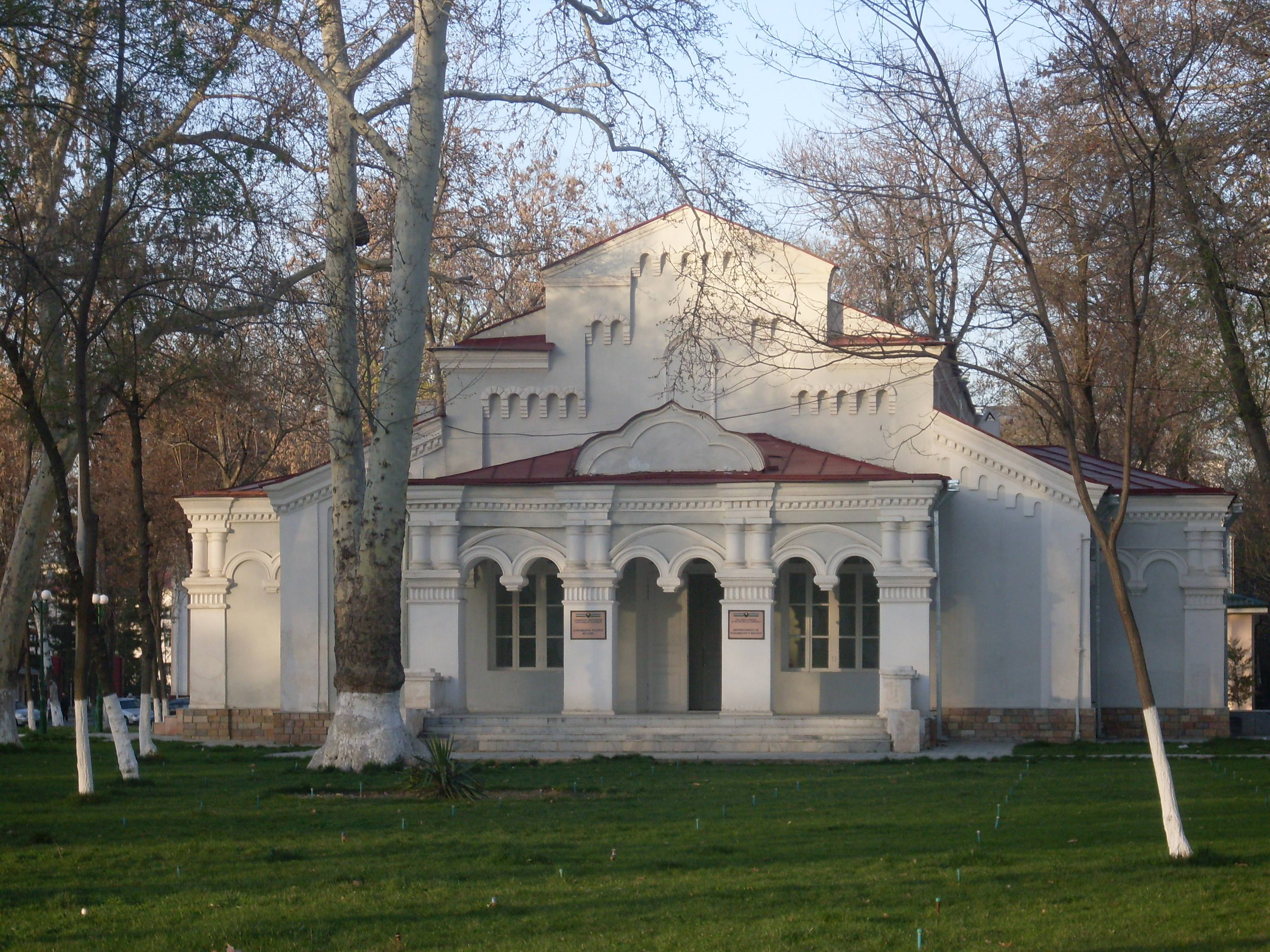
Orthodox Church of St. George Pobedonosets

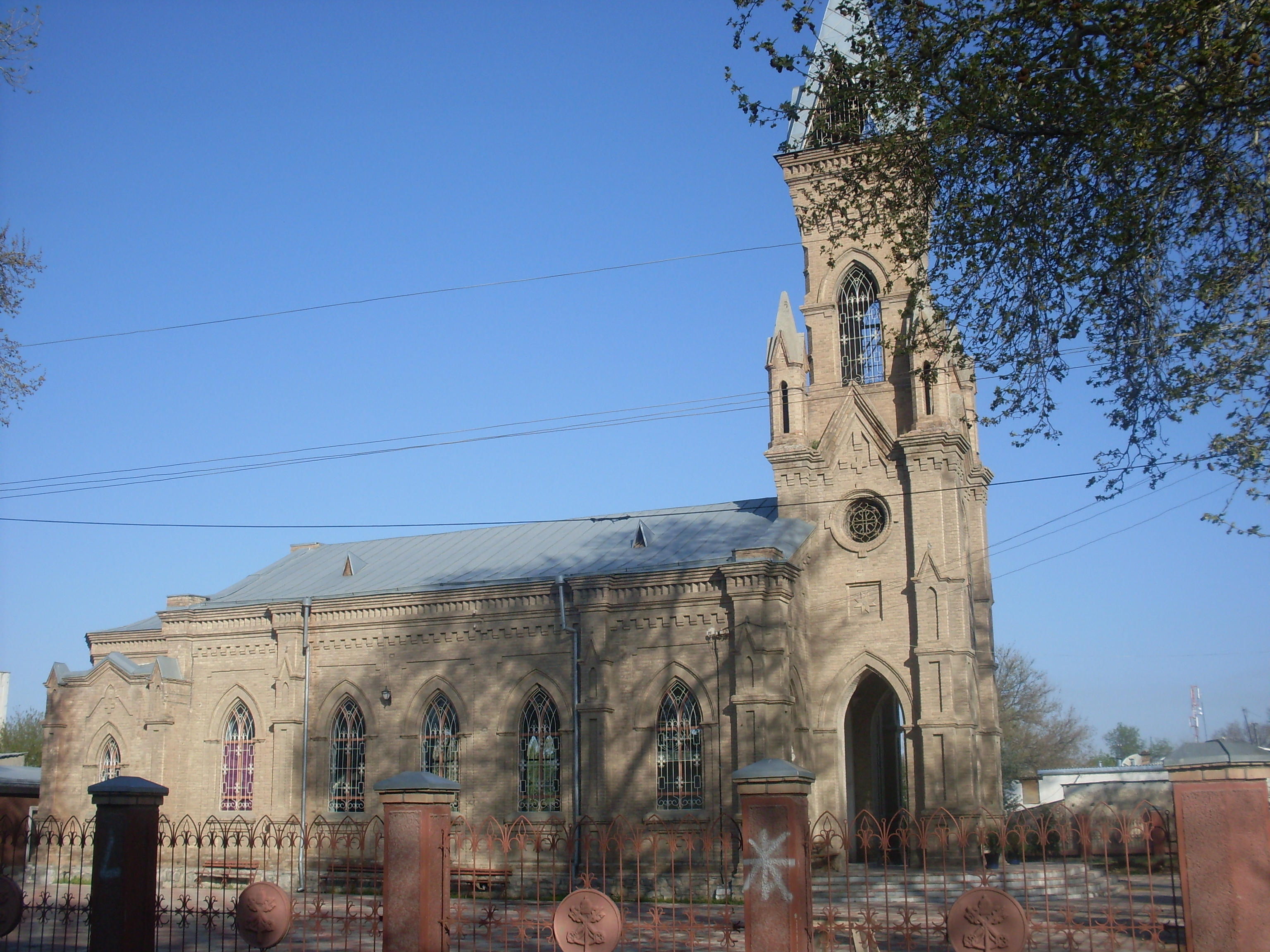
St. John the Baptist Catholic Church

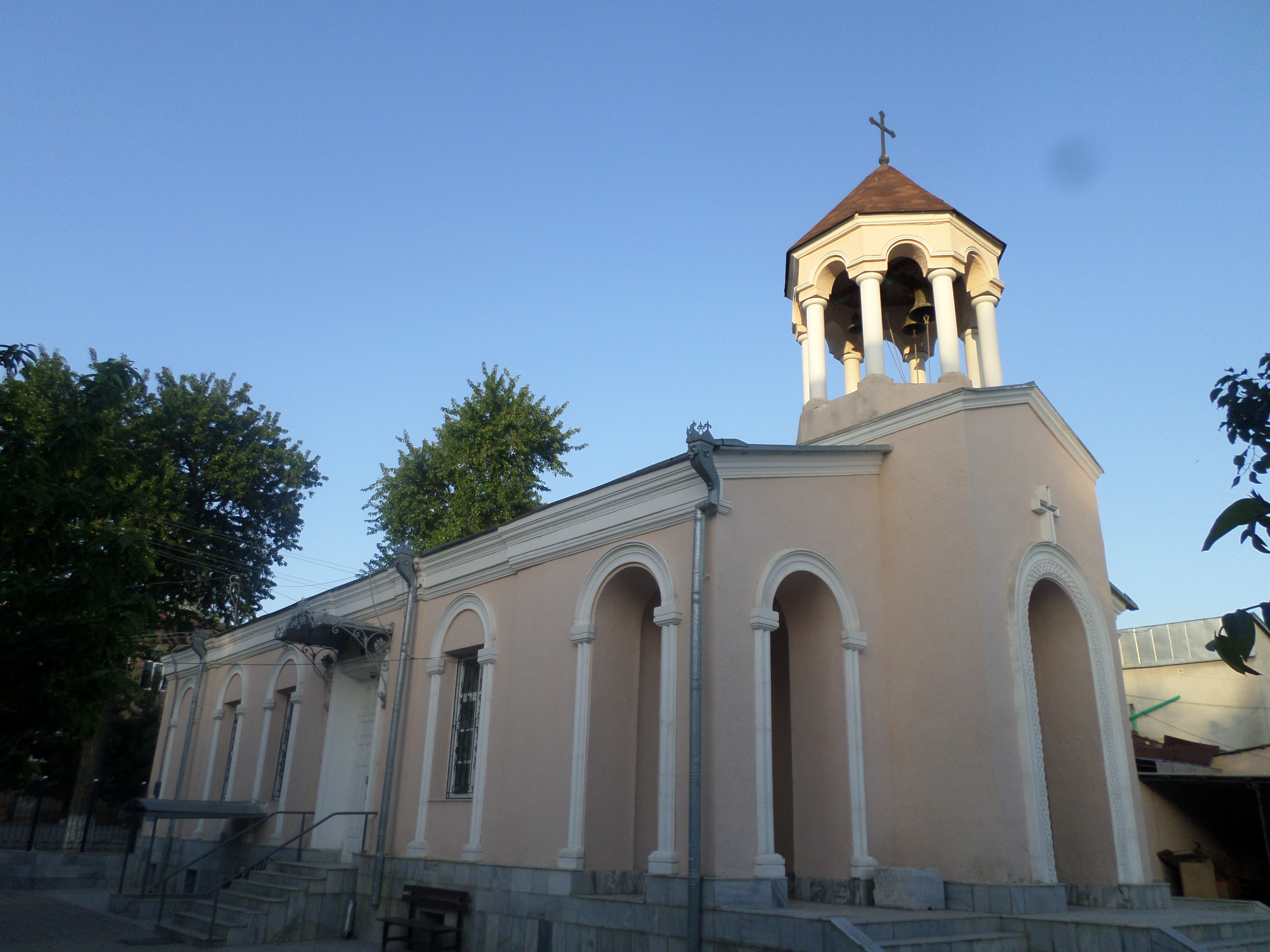
Armenian Church Surb Astvatsatsin

Samarkand also has several thousand Protestants, including Lutherans, Baptists, Mormons, Jehovah's Witnesses, Adventists, and members of the Korean Presbyterian church. These Christian movements appeared in Samarkand mainly after the independence of Uzbekistan in 1991.

=== Judaism ===
Benjamin of Tudela reported that Samarkand had 50,000 Jews in 1170.

== Landmarks ==
=== Silk Road Samarkand (Eternal city) ===
Silk Road Samarkand is a modern multiplex which opened in early 2022 in eastern Samarkand. The complex covers 260 hectares and includes world-class business and medical hotels, eateries, recreational facilities, park grounds, an ethnographic corner and a large congress hall for hosting international events.

There is an Eternal City situated in Silk Road Samarkand complex. This site which occupies 17 hectares recreates the spirit of the ancient city, backed up by the history and traditions of Uzbek lands and Uzbek people for the guests of the Silk Road Samarkand. The narrow streets house multiple shops of artists, artisans, and craftsmen. The pavilions of the Eternal City were inspired by real houses and picturesque squares described in ancient books.

Visitors can taste national dishes from different eras and regions of the country and also see street performances. The Eternal City showcases a mix of Parthian, Hellenistic, and Islamic cultures. The project was inspired and designed by Bobur Ismoilov, a famous modern artist.

== Architecture ==
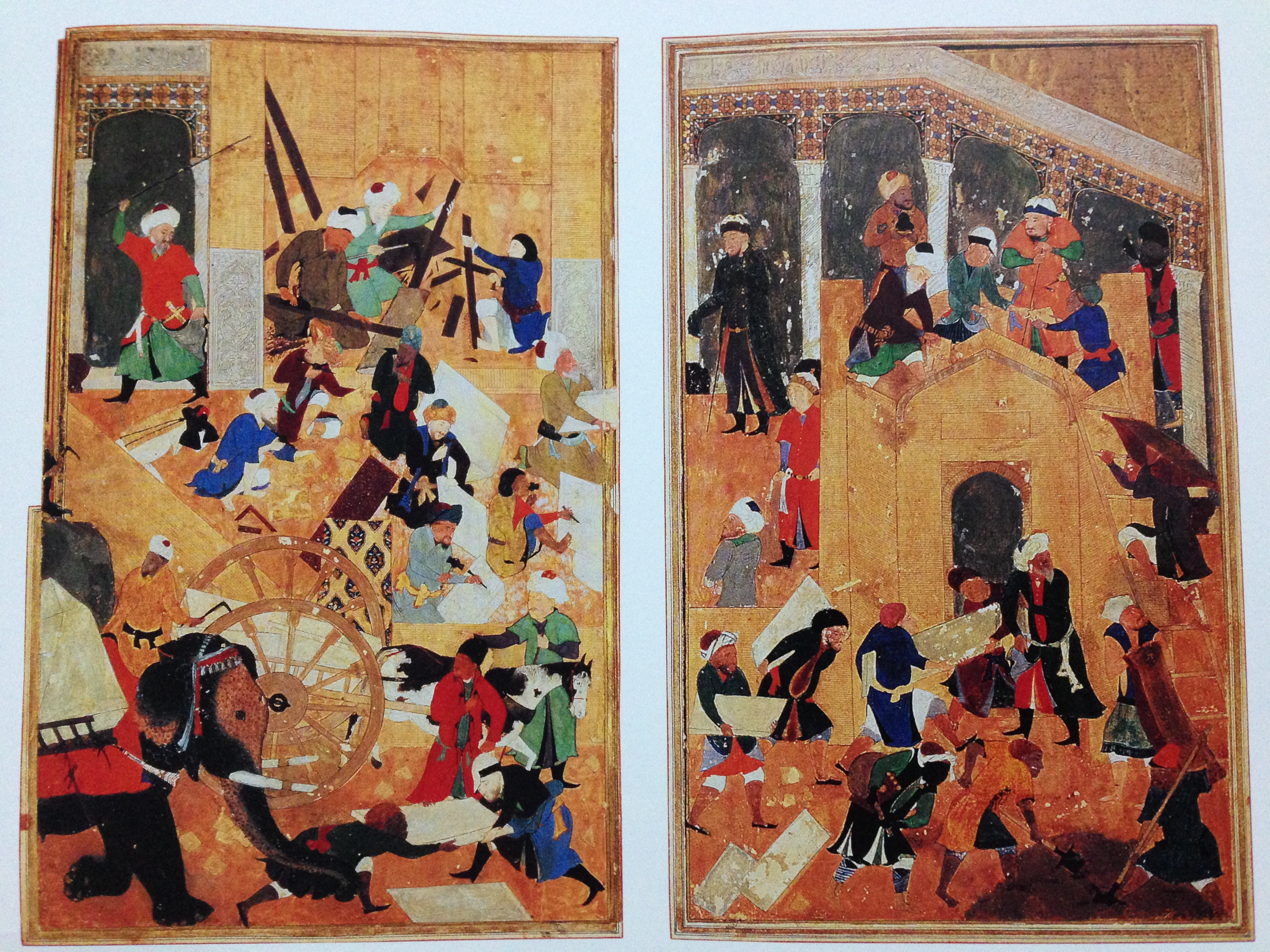
Building the Great Mosque of Samarkand. Illustration by Bihzad for the Zafar-Nameh. Text copied in Herat in 1467–68 and illuminated the late 1480s. John Work Garret Collection, Milton S. Eisenhower Library, Johns Hopkins University, Baltimore.

Timur initiated the building of Bibi-Khanym after his 1398–1399 campaign in India. The Bibi-Khanym originally had about 450 marble columns, which were hauled there and set up with the help of 95 elephants that Timur had brought back from Hindustan. Artisans and stonemasons from India designed the mosque's dome, giving it its distinctive appearance amongst the other buildings. An 1897 earthquake destroyed the columns, which were not entirely restored in the subsequent reconstruction.

The best-known landmark of Samarkand is the mausoleum known as Gur-i Amir. It exhibits the influences of many cultures, past civilizations, neighboring peoples, and religions, especially those of Islam. Despite the devastation wrought by Mongols to Samarkand's pre-Timurid Islamic architecture, under Timur these architectural styles were revived, recreated, and restored. The blueprint and layout of the mosque itself, with their precise measurements, demonstrate the Islamic passion for geometry. The entrance to the Gur-i Amir is decorated with Arabic calligraphy and inscriptions, the latter a common feature in Islamic architecture. Timur's meticulous attention to detail is especially obvious inside the mausoleum: the tiled walls are a marvelous example of mosaic faience, an Iranian technique in which each tile is cut, colored, and fit into place individually. The tiles of the Gur-i Amir were also arranged so that they spell out religious words such as "Muhammad" and "Allah."

The ornamentation of the Gur-i Amir's walls includes floral and vegetal motifs, which signify gardens; the floor tiles feature uninterrupted floral patterns. In Islam, gardens are symbols of paradise, and as such, they were depicted on the walls of tombs and grown in Samarkand itself. Samarkand boasted two major gardens, the New Garden and the Garden of Heart's Delight, which became the central areas of entertainment for ambassadors and important guests. In 1218, a friend of Genghis Khan named Yelü Chucai reported that Samarkand was the most beautiful city of all, as "it was surrounded by numerous gardens. Every household had a garden, and all the gardens were well designed, with canals and water fountains that supplied water to round or square-shaped ponds. The landscape included rows of willows and cypress trees, and peach and plum orchards were shoulder to shoulder." Persian carpets with floral patterns have also been found in some Timurid buildings.

The elements of traditional Islamic architecture can be seen in traditional mud-brick Uzbek houses that are built around central courtyards with gardens. Most of these houses have painted wooden ceilings and walls. By contrast, houses in the west of the city are chiefly European-style homes built in the 19th and 20th centuries.

Turko-Mongol influence is also apparent in Samarkand's architecture. It is believed that the melon-shaped domes of the mausoleums were designed to echo yurts or gers, traditional Mongol tents in which the bodies of the dead were displayed before burial or other disposition. Timur built his tents from more-durable materials, such as bricks and wood, but their purposes remained largely unchanged. The chamber in which Timur's own body was laid included "tugs", poles whose tops were hung with a circular arrangement of horse or yak tail hairs. These banners symbolized an ancient Turkic tradition of sacrificing horses, which were valuable commodities, to honor the dead. Tugs were also a type of cavalry standard used by many nomads, up to the time of the Ottoman Turks.

Colors of buildings in Samarkand also have significant meanings. The dominant architectural color is blue, which Timur used to convey a broad range of concepts. For example, the shades of blue in the Gur-i Amir are colors of mourning; in that era, blue was the color of mourning in Central Asia, as it still is in various cultures today. Blue was also considered the color that could ward off "the evil eye" in Central Asia; this notion is evidenced by in the number of blue-painted doors in and around the city. Furthermore, blue represented water, a particularly rare resource in the Middle East and Central Asia; walls painted blue symbolized the wealth of the city.

Gold also has a strong presence in the city. Timur's fascination with vaulting explains the excessive use of gold in the Gur-i Amir, as well as the use of embroidered gold fabric in both the city and his buildings. The Mongols had great interests in Chinese- and Persian-style golden silk textiles, as well as nasij woven in Iran and Transoxiana. Mongol leaders like Ögedei Khan built textile workshops in their cities to be able to produce gold fabrics themselves.

=== Suburbs ===
Suburbs of the city include: Gulyakandoz, Superfosfatnyy, Bukharishlak, Ulugbek, Ravanak, Kattakishlak, Registan, Zebiniso, Kaftarkhona, Uzbankinty.

== Transport ==
=== Local ===
Samarkand has a strong public-transport system. From Soviet times up through today, municipal buses and taxis (GAZ-21, GAZ-24, GAZ-3102, VAZ-2101, VAZ-2106 and VAZ-2107) have operated in Samarkand. Buses, mostly SamAvto and Isuzu buses, are the most common and popular mode of transport in the city. Taxis, which are mostly Chevrolets and Daewoo sedans, are usually yellow in color. Since 2017, there have also been several Samarkandian tram lines, mostly Vario LF.S Czech trams. From the Soviet Era up until 2005, Samarkandians also got around via trolleybus. Finally, Samarkand has the so-called "Marshrutka," which are Daewoo Damas and GAZelle minibuses.

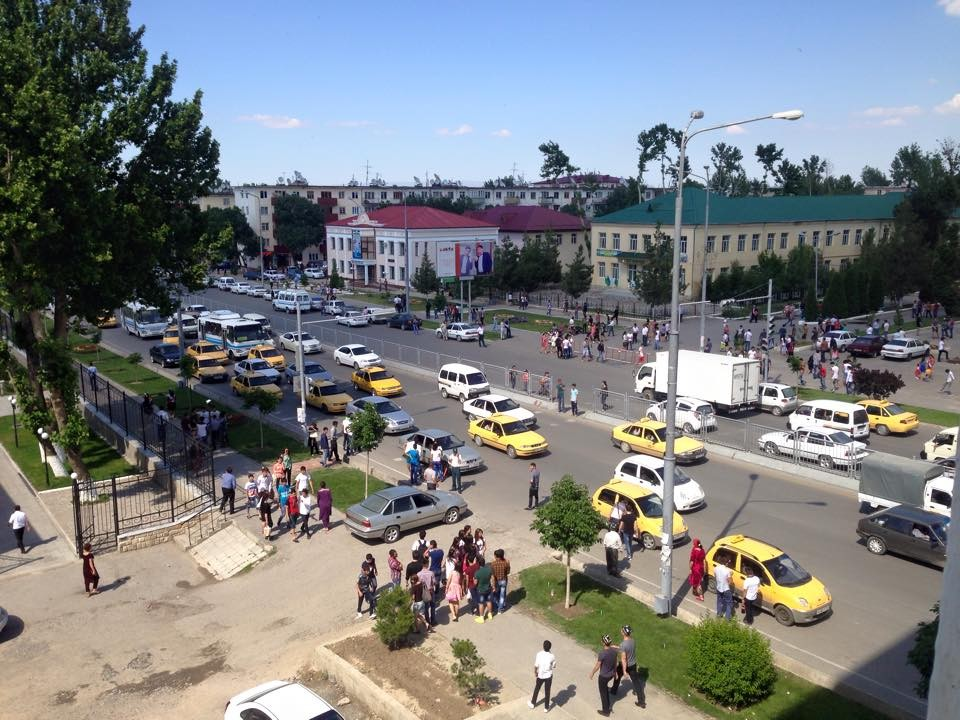
Many yellow taxis on the streets of Samarkand

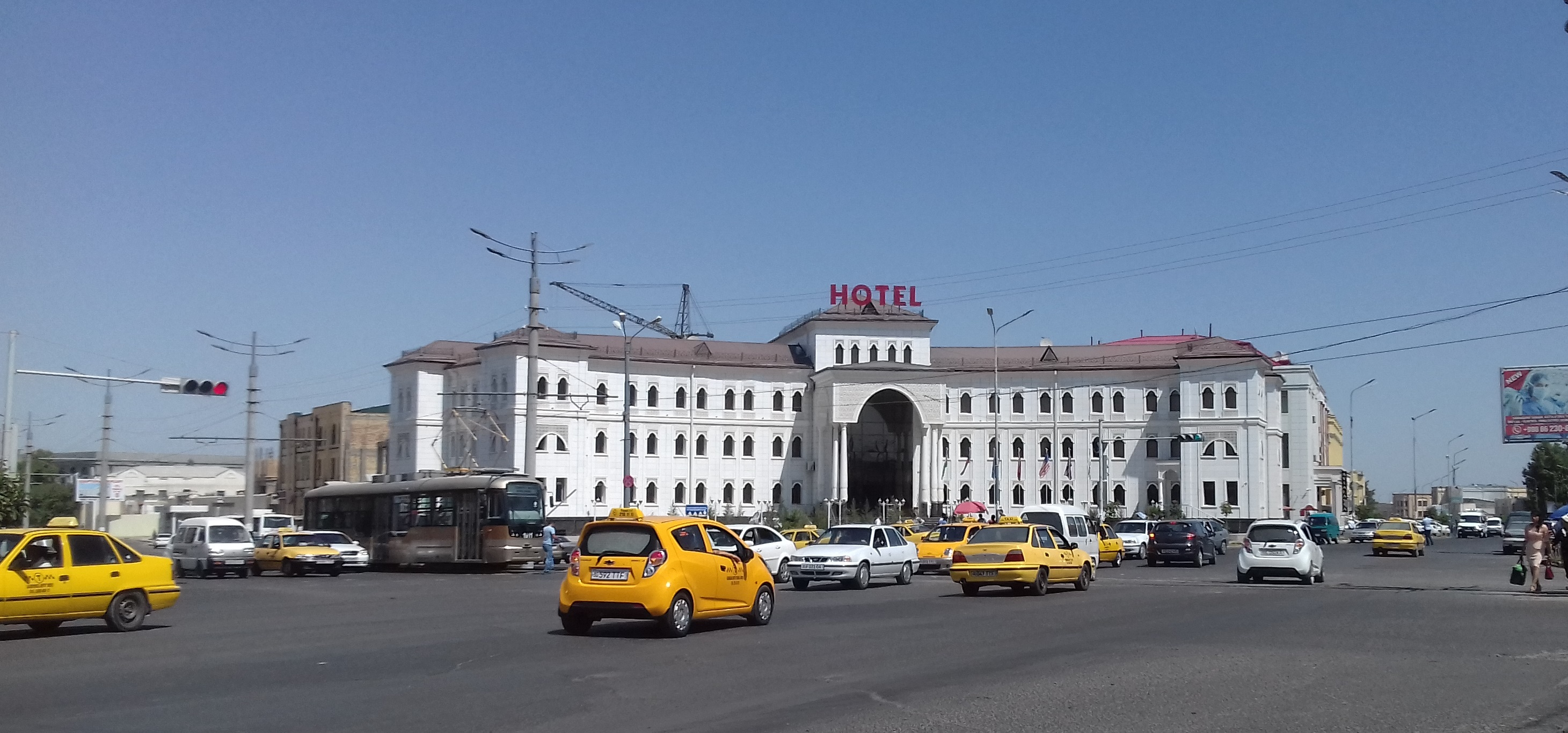
Taxi and tram on Rudaki Street in Samarkand

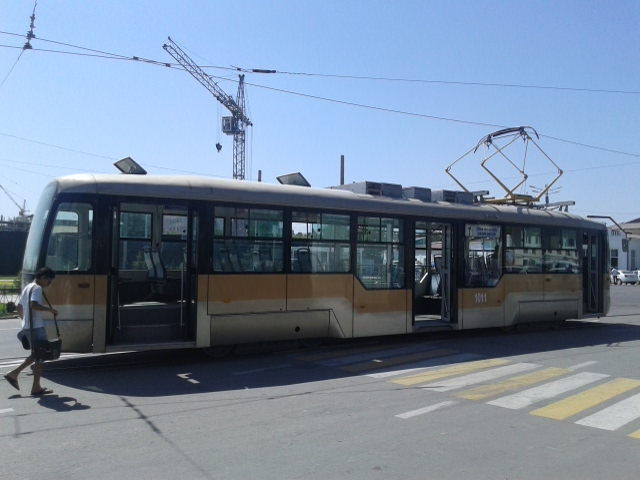
Tram in Samarkand

Until 1950, the main forms of transport in Samarkand were carriages and "arabas" with horses and donkeys. However, the city had a steam tram from 1924 to 1930, and there were more modern trams from 1947 to 1973.

=== Air transport ===
In the north of the city is Samarkand International Airport, which was opened in the 1930s, under the Soviets. As of spring 2019, Samarkand International Airport has flights to Tashkent, Nukus, Moscow, Saint Petersburg, Yekaterinburg, Kazan, Istanbul, and Dushanbe; charter flights to other cities are also available.

=== Railway ===
Modern Samarkand is an important rail junction of Uzbekistan, and all national east–west railway routes pass through the city. The most important and longest of these is Tashkent–Kungrad. High-speed Tashkent–Samarkand high-speed rail line trains run between Tashkent, Samarkand, and Bukhara. Samarkand also has international railway connections: Saratov–Samarkand, Moscow–Samarkand, and Astana–Samarkand.

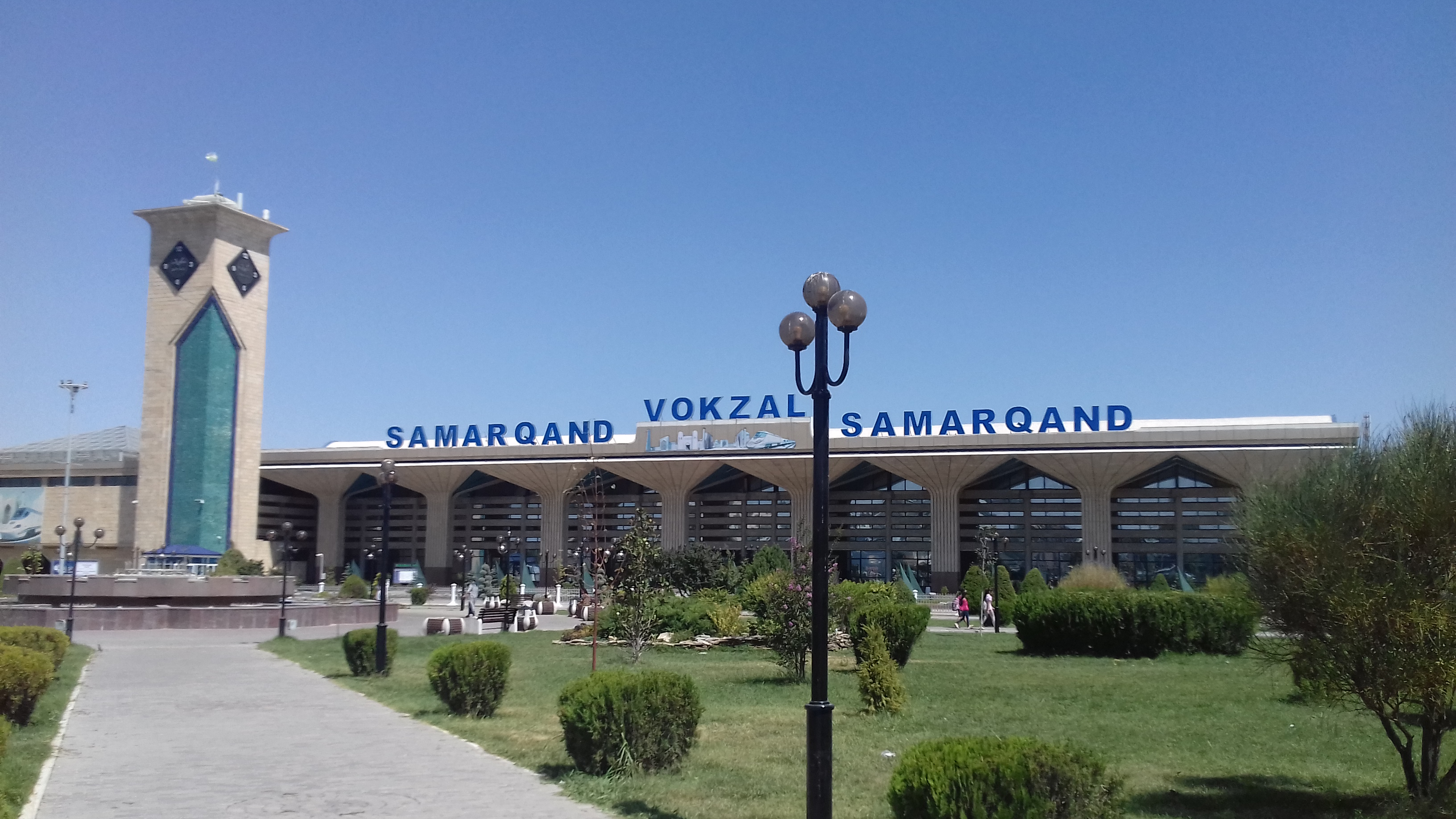
Samarkand railway station

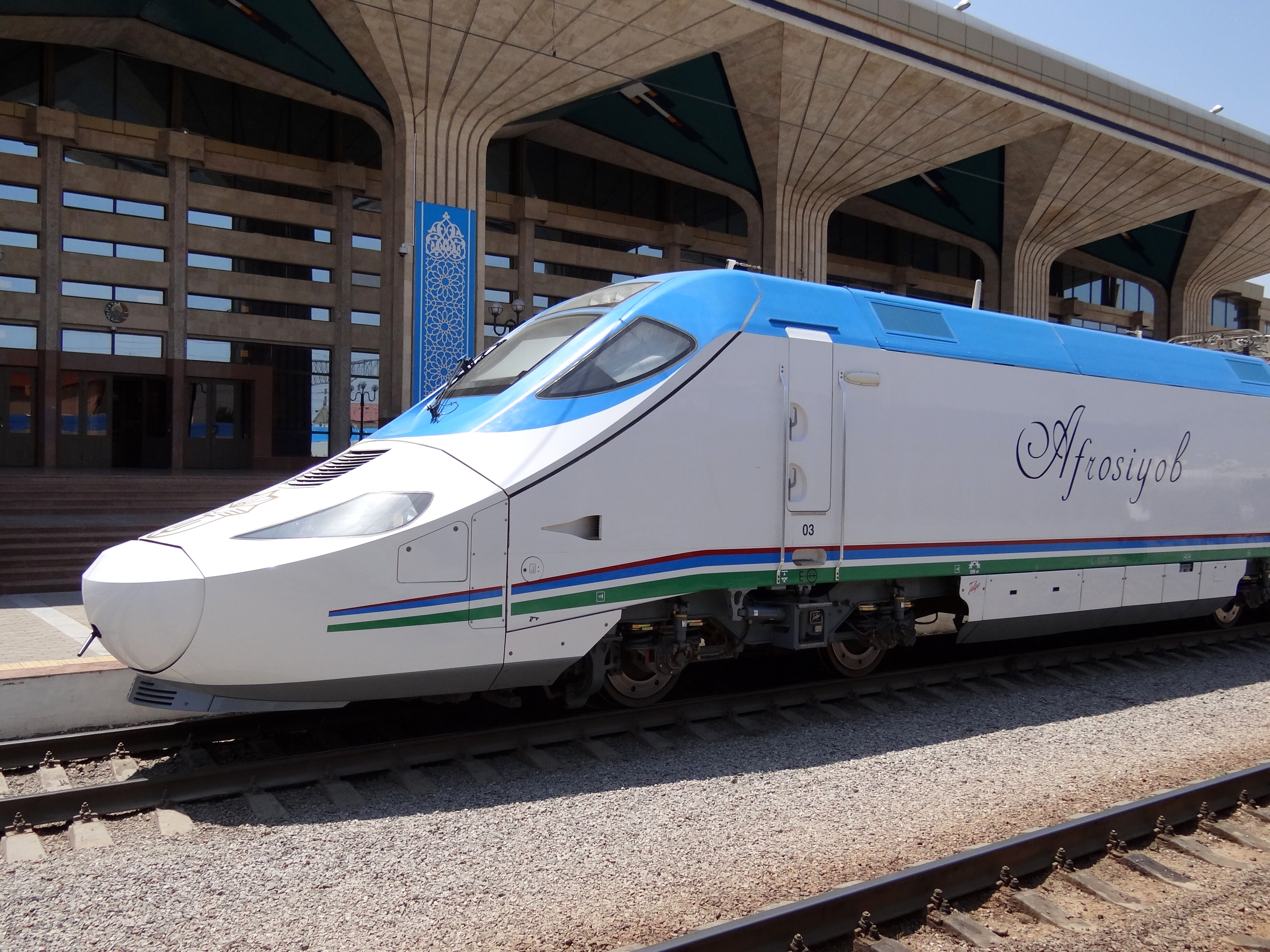
Afrasiyab (Talgo 250) high-speed train in Samarkand railway station

Between 1879 and 1891, the Russian Empire built the Trans-Caspian Railway to facilitate its expansion into Central Asia. The railway originated in Krasnovodsk (now Turkmenbashi) on the Caspian Sea coast. Its terminus was originally Samarkand, whose station first opened in May 1888. However, a decade later, the railway was extended eastward to Tashkent and Andijan, and its name was changed to Central Asian Railways. Nonetheless, Samarkand remained one of the largest and most important stations of the Uzbek SSR and Soviet Central Asia.

== International relations ==
Samarkand is twinned with:

- Agra, India
- Balkh, Afghanistan
- Banda Aceh, Indonesia
- Cusco, Peru
- Jūrmala, Latvia
- Kairouan, Tunisia
- Khujand, Tajikistan
- Krasnoyarsk, Russia
- Lahore, Pakistan
- Liège, Belgium
- Mary, Turkmenistan
- Merv, Turkmenistan
- Mexico City, Mexico
- New Delhi, India
- Nishapur, Iran
- Plovdiv, Bulgaria
- Rio de Janeiro, Brazil
- Samara, Russia
- Xi'an, China
- Nara, Japan

Samarkand has friendly relations with:

- Antalya, Turkey
- Babruysk, Belarus
- Bremen, Germany
- Canberra, Australia
- Eskişehir, Turkey
- Florence, Italy
- Gyeongju, South Korea
- Istanbul, Turkey
- İzmir, Turkey
- Lyon, France
- Lviv, Ukraine
- Valencia, Spain

== In literature ==
The frame story of One Thousand and One Nights involves a Sasanian king who assigns his brother, Shah Zaman, to rule over Samarkand.

The poet James Elroy Flecker published the poem The Golden Journey to Samarkand in 1913. It was included in his play, Hassan. Hassan (The Story of Hassan of Bagdad and How He Came to Make the Golden Journey to Samarkand) is a five-act drama in prose with verse passages. It tells the story of Hassan, a young man from Baghdad who embarks on a journey to Samarkand. Along the way, he encounters various challenges and obstacles, including bandits, treacherous terrain, and political turmoil.

Samarkand (French: Samarcande), written by French-Lebanese writer Amin Maalouf, is a 1988 historical fiction novel that revolves around the 11th-century Persian poet Omar Khayyám and his poetry collection Rubaiyat.

In 2002, Nobel Laureate Wole Soyinka titled his collection of poetry Samarkand and Other Markets I Have Known.

English author Jonathan Stroud published his book The Amulet of Samarkand in 2003. The book contains no allusions to Samarkand other than namesake.

The city of Samarkand is famous for being the subject of an Uzbek tale called "The Rendezvous at Samarkand." It was recounted by a 12th-century Persian storyteller and mystic, Farid Al-Din Attar. In a legendary Baghdad, ruled by a powerful caliph, lived a young, healthy vizier. He seemed to have his whole life ahead of him. One day, he went to the city market, incognito, as he often did. Amidst the stalls of the spice merchants, he encountered a skeletal woman, who turned around as he passed and reached out to him. The vizier, a wise man, immediately recognized death. Terrified by what he saw, he begged his caliph to let him flee Baghdad, explaining that death was here and wanted to take him. His only hope was to immediately saddle his fastest horse and gallop off far from the city. The caliph therefore granted him permission to leave and asked him where he would be going. The vizier replies that to escape death, he is going to Samarkand, the desert city, on the edge of the kingdom, on the borders of Asia and the Middle East, thinking he will be safe there, far from the death that lurks in Baghdad! However, the caliph also decides to go to the market to check for the presence of death. He recognizes her very quickly and addresses her without fear, asking her the meaning of the gesture she made towards the vizier. "It was only a gesture of surprise..." replies death "Because I saw him in Baghdad while I must take him tonight in Samarkand..." This tale illustrates the inevitability of human destiny in the face of death.

This tale also inspired Agatha Christie to title her novel Appointment with Death. The John O'Hara novel Appointment in Samarra uses the tale for its title, presents it in a prologue, and references in the foreword; O'Hara heard it from Dorothy Parker who saw it in a Somerset Maugham play.

In Theodore Judson's 2004 novel Fitzpatrick's War, the title character attempts to make Samarkand (which he renames "Neapolis") the capital of a world empire and resides there until his assassination.

Mentioned in books of World of Watches and Day Watch movie (2006).

== Notable people ==
- Bakhtiyor Fazilov, Businessman
- Takhmina Ikromova, Uzbek rhythmic gymnast
- Igor Sarukhanov, Russian pop musician, composer and artist of Armenian descent

== See also ==
- Samarkand non
- The Mongol Invasion (trilogy)

== General and cited references ==
- Azim Malikov, "Cult of saints and shrines in the Samarqand province of Uzbekistan". International Journal of Modern Anthropology. No. 4. 2010, pp. 116–123.
- Azim Malikov, "The politics of memory in Samarkand in post-Soviet period". International Journal of Modern Anthropology. (2018) Vol. 2. Issue No. 11. pp. 127–145.
- Azim Malikov, "Sacred lineages of Samarqand: history and identity". Anthropology of the Middle East, Volume 15, Issue 1, Summer 2020, рp. 34–49.
- Alexander Morrison, Russian Rule in Samarkand 1868–1910: A Comparison with British India (Oxford, OUP, 2008) (Oxford Historical Monographs).

Preceded by -	Capital of the Samanid Empire; 819–892	Succeeded by Bukhara
Preceded by Gurganj	Capital of Khwarazmian Empire; 1212–1220	Succeeded by Ghazna
Preceded by -	Capital of the Timurid Empire; 1370–1405	Succeeded by Herat
Preceded by Bukhara	Capital of the Uzbek SSR; 1925–1930	Succeeded by Tashkent
