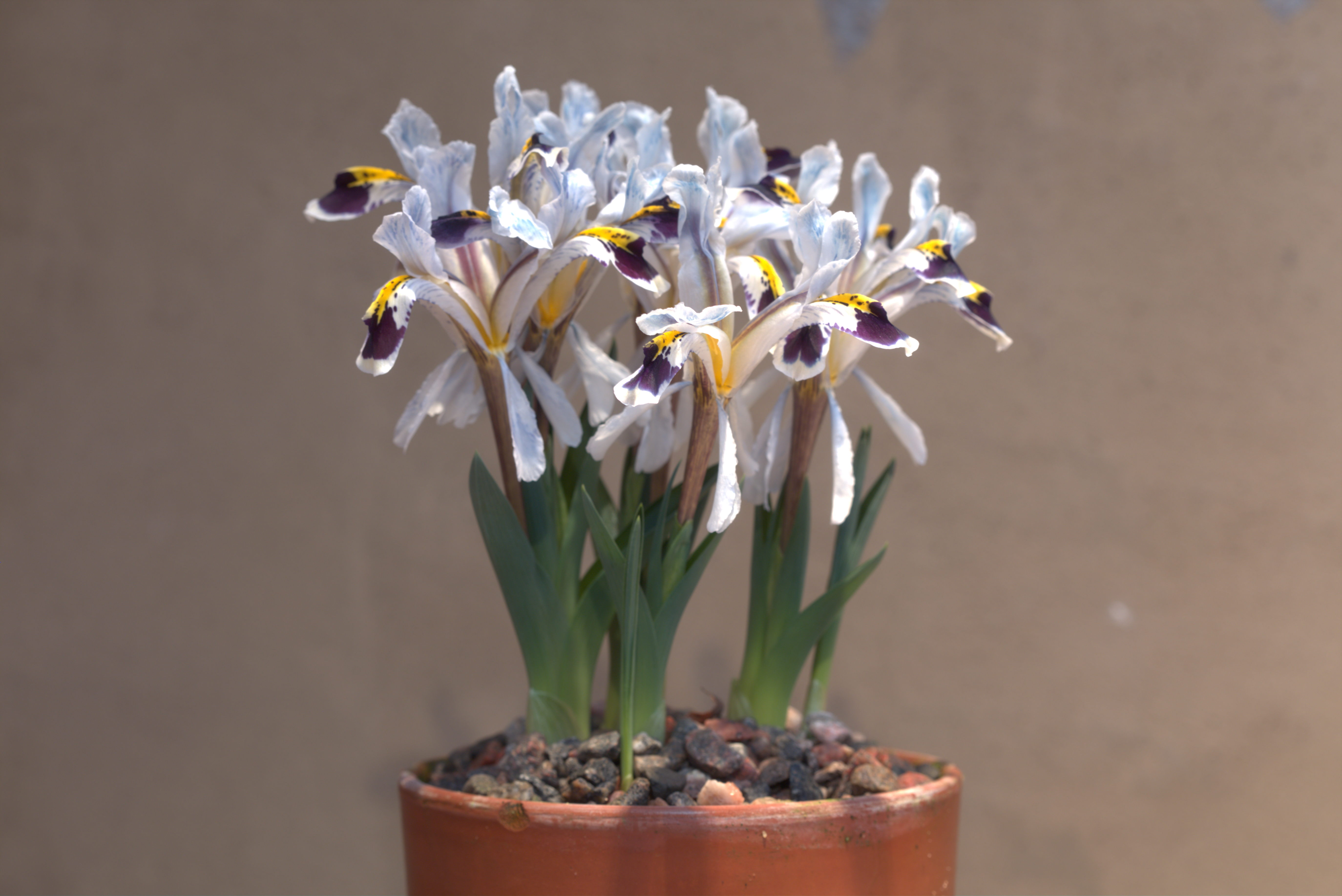
- Iris rosenbachiana in Gothenburg Botanical Garden

Scientific classification
- Kingdom: Plantae
- Clade: Tracheophytes
- Clade: Angiosperms
- Clade: Monocots
- Order: Asparagales
- Family: Iridaceae
- Genus: Iris
- Subgenus: Iris subg. Scorpiris
- Section: Iris sect. Scorpiris
- Species: I. rosenbachiana

Binomial name
- Iris rosenbachiana Regel

Synonyms
- Iris rosenbachiana var. violacea (Regel); Juno rosenbachiana (Regel) Vved.

= Iris rosenbachiana =

Species of plant

Iris rosenbachiana, the spinster iris, is a species in the genus Iris, it is also in the subgenus Scorpiris. It is a bulbous perennial from Central Asia, within Tajikistan and Afghanistan. It has long mid-green leaves, short flower stem, sweet scented flowers in early spring in shades of purple.

== Description ==
Iris rosenbachiana is thought to be in the same 'physocaulon' group of junos, along with Iris kopetdagensis, Iris leptorhiza, Iris popovii, Iris nicolai, Iris baldschuanica and Iris zaprjagajevii. They all have short thick storage tubers which come to a point, and they have an extra side bulb in addition to the bulb which produces the flowers and leaves.

It has lance-shaped, channelled, mid-green leaves formed from a basal tuft. The multiple leaves, grow at the same time as the short flower stem.

It grows up between to 10–15 cm (4–6 in) tall.

It has deeply sweet scented flowers.

It has between 1–3 flowers per stem, which are long tubed and about 4–5 cm (1.5–2 in) wide.

This iris is one of the first Juno irises to appear in mild winters of Washington, D.C., in the US, flowering in late February, but it can also flower in March in USDA Zone 7 gardens. In the UK, it blooms between March and April.

The flowers are variable in colour, but are generally of rosy lavender with markings of darker purple and gold, but they can range from deep purple, deep rich purple, light purple, pale mauve to white.

It has small down-turned rich purple standards and reddish purple falls, each with an orange, or yellow ridge or crest in the centre.

It has yellow-orange pollen.

This iris has a seed that has an aril.

== Taxonomy ==
It is sometimes known as the Spinster iris.

It was first published by Regel in 'Trudy Imperatorskago St. Peterburgskago Botaniceskago Sada' Vol3 in 1884.

The specific epithet rosenbachiana is derived from that of the Russian governor of Turkestan where the bulb was found, Nikolai Rozenbakh (1804 – 1889).

Iris rosenbachiana is now the accepted name by the RHS, it was verified by United States Department of Agriculture and the Agricultural Research Service on 3 October 2014.

Note, Iris rosenbachiana var. baldshuanica is a synonym of Iris baldshuanica.

== Native ==
Iris rosenbachiana is found in Central Asia, within North Afghanistan. It has been found in the Pamir-Alai mountains at altitudes of up to 2000 m above sea level, and it has also been found in the Hissar Mountains, and Fann Mountains in Tajikistan.

== Cultivation ==
This species is similar to Iris nicolai both in cultural requirements and form.

It prefers to grow in well-drained soils, that have a stony composition including dolomitic lime dust. They like summer drought and well ventilated positions. It is difficult to grow outside in the UK, so best cultivated in an alpine house or bulb frame.

== Known Cultivars ==
- Iris rosenbachiana 'Harangon' - large white flowers
- Iris rosenbachiana 'Tovil Dara' - dark purple flowers from Tovil Dara town in Tajikistan.
- Iris rosenbachiana 'Varzob' - cream coloured flowers from Tajikistan.

== Other sources ==
- Czerepanov, S. K. Vascular plants of Russia and adjacent states (the former USSR). 1995 (L USSR)
- Khassanov, F. O. & N. Rakhimova 2012. Taxonomic revision of the genus Iris L. (Iridaceae Juss.) for the flora of Central Asia (Stapfia) 97:179.
- Komarov, V. L. et al., eds. Flora SSSR. 1934-1964 (F USSR)
- Mathew, B. The Iris. 1981 (Iris) 164.
- Rechinger, K. H., ed. Flora iranica. 1963- (F Iran)
