= Iskander Darya =

River in Tajikistan

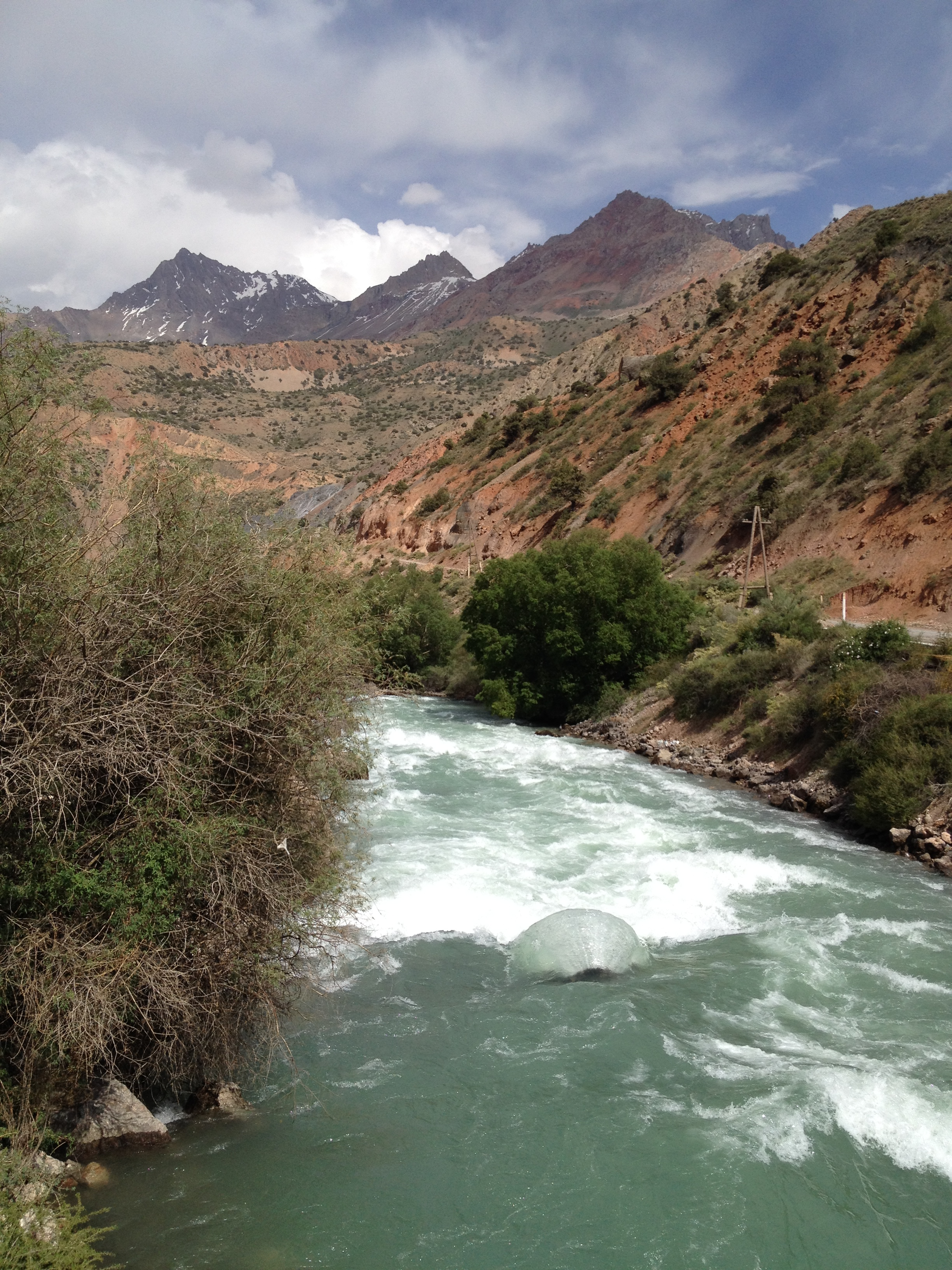
- Iskander Darya near river head

Location
- Country: Tajikistan

Physical characteristics
- Mouth: Fan Darya
  - coordinates: 39°11′20″N 68°32′18″E
- Length: 20 km (12 mi)
- Basin size: 950 km^{2} (370 sq mi)
- Discharge
  - average: 19 cubic metres per second (670 cu ft/s)

Basin features
- Progression: Fan Darya→ Zeravshan→ Qorakoʻl oasis

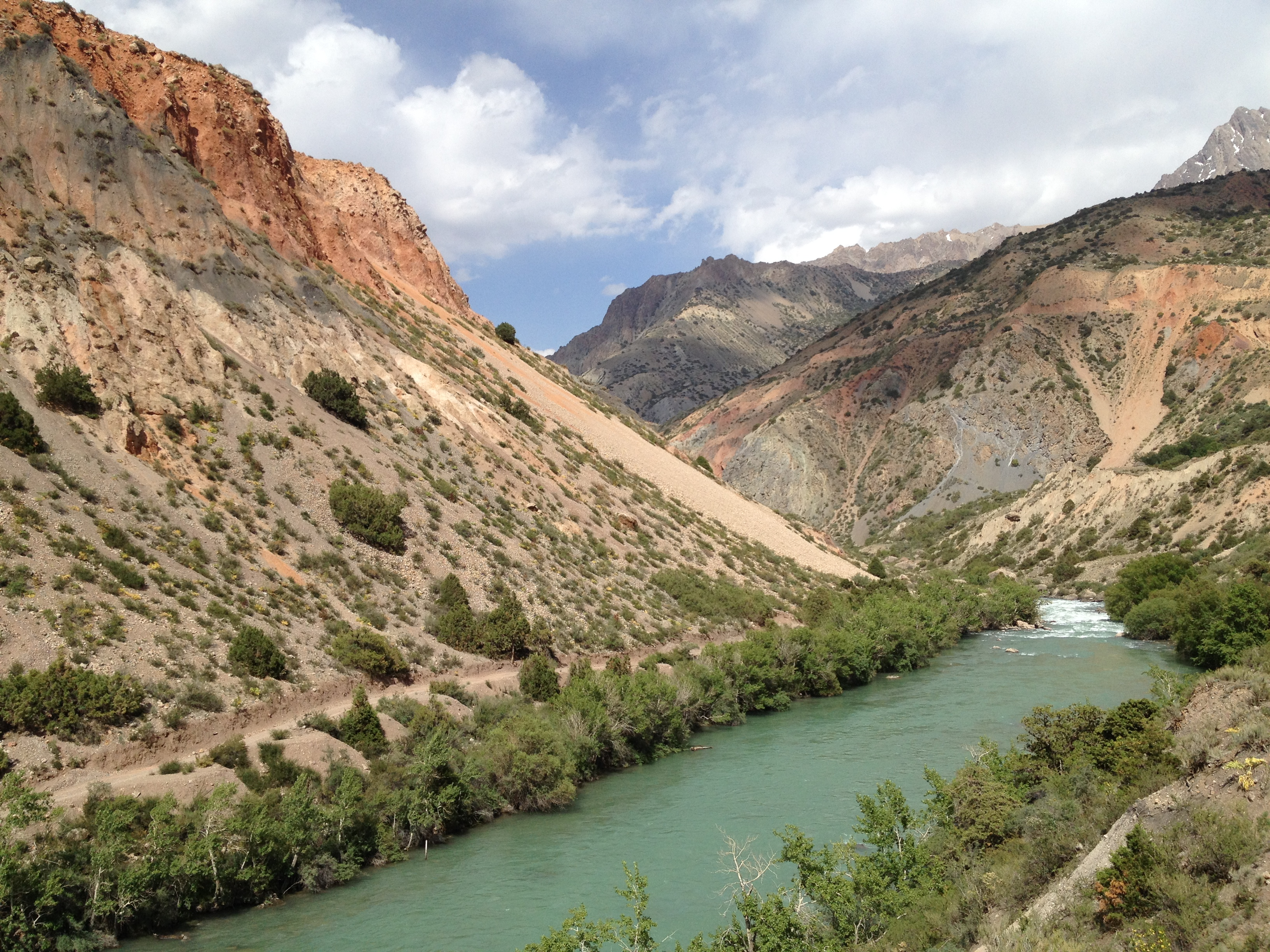
Iskander Darya in higher reaches

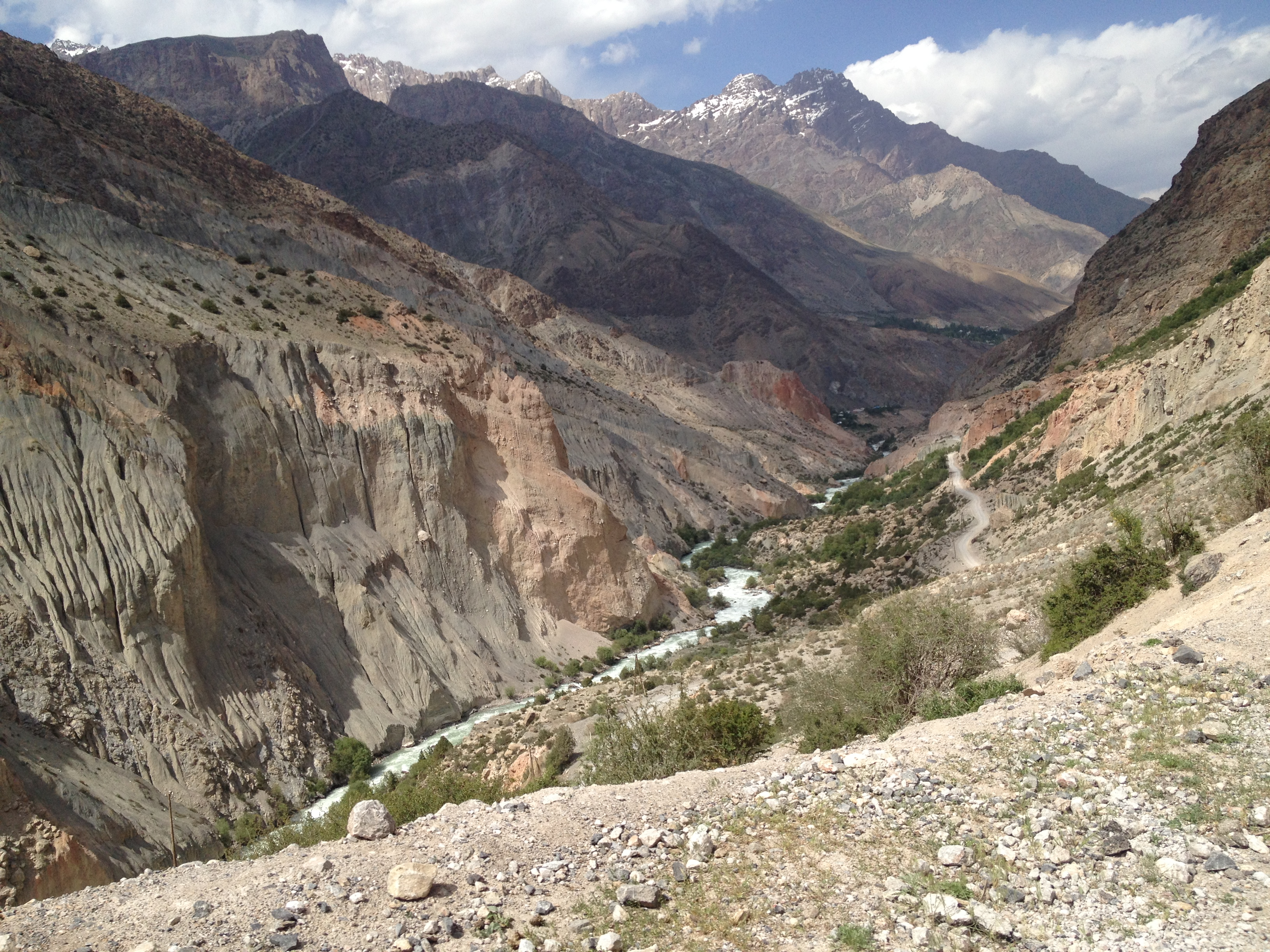
Valley of Iskander Darya in higher reaches

The Iskander Darya (Russian: Искандердарья; Tajik: Искандардарё) is a river in Ayni District of Sughd Region, Tajikistan. The Iskander Darya is 20 kilometres (12 mi) long, and the area of its drainage basin is 950 square kilometres (370 mi^{2}) long. It is the left source river of the Fan Darya.

The Iskander Darya has its source in Lake Iskanderkul and flows east. The mouth of Iskander Darya is near the village of Zarafshan II. The river merges with the Yaghnob at an altitude of around 1640 m, forming the Fan Darya.
