= Siege of Bukhara (1598) =

Part of the Kazakh-Uzbek wars

- Part of the Kazakh invasion of Transoxiana (1598) of Kazakh–Uzbek Wars
Date	1598
Location	Bukhara, Uzbekistan
Result	Uzbek victory; Siege lifted

Belligerents
Kazakh Khanate	Khanate of Bukhara

Commanders and leaders
(Kazakh Khanate) Tawakkul Khan	(Khanate of Bukhara) Pir Muhammad Khan II

Strength
70,000–80,000	15,000

The Siege of Bukhara (1598) was a siege by the Kazakh Khanate led by Tauekel Khan against the Khanate of Bukhara's capital of Bukhara during the Kazakh invasion of Northern Bukhara. This resulted in Uzbek victory and failure of capture of Bukhara by the Kazakhs.

In 1598, the Kazakh Khan Tauekel invaded the Khanate of Bukhara, after the death of the Uzbek Khan, Abdullah Khan II. The Kazakhs with the support of the Kyrgyz, and Karapalkaks soon invaded the region of Transoxiana after their departure from Dasht-i-Kipchak. The Kazakhs later captured the following cities on the Syr Darya; Turkistan, Tashkent and Samarkand. After which Taukel left Samarkand with a force of about 70,000 to 80,000 men—leaving Esim Khan on Samarkand with 20,000 men—to capture the city of Bukhara. Meanwhile the city garrison of 15,000 men had fortified Bukhara, which Pirmuhammed Khan ordered the city walls and towers be fortified. Instead of abandoning the city or directly confronting the larger Kazakh army.

Following those events, the Kazakhs attempted a siege for about thirteen days, causing the Kazakh army to retreat to Tashkent, defeated by Bukharan forces again during their retreat. Esim Khan later sent a message to his brother Tauekel, stating:

"It is shameful, indeed shameful, that such a large army as the Tsar had could be defeated by a handful of Bukharans and forced to flee. If the Khan were to fugitively return to Samarkand, it could very well happen that the Samarkandians would no longer wish to obey us. Let the Khan return again; I, with the army that is with me, will join him."

— Esim Khan

== Bibliography ==
Sultanov, T. I (2006). Поднятые на белой Кошме. Ханы казахских степей [Raised on the White Felt. Khans of the Kazakh Steppes] (in Russian). Astana: Astana Damu-21. p. 252. ISBN 9965-9522-8-0.

Atygaev, Nurlan (2023). КАЗАХСКОЕ ХАНСТВО: ОЧЕРКИ ВНЕШНЕПОЛИТИЧЕСКОЙ ИСТОРИИ XV-XVII BEKOВ [Essays on the Foreign Policy History of the 15th–17th Centuries] (in Russian). Almaty: Eurasian Research Institute. ISBN 978-601-7805-24-1.

Abuseitov, M. Kh. (1985). Казахское ханство во второй половине XVI века [Kazakh Khanate in the second half of the 16th century] (in Russian). Almaty: Nauka publishing. p. 104.
