= Seven Lakes =

Seven Lakes may refer to any of the following:

Locations

- Seven Lakes Basin, a geographic depression in Washington, United States
- Seven Lakes (Chile), a chain of seven lakes in southern Chile
- Seven Lakes (Tajikistan), a group of seven mountain lakes located in the Sughd Region, Tajikistan
- Seven Lakes of San Pablo in Laguna
- Seven Lakes, Colorado, for the former area in El Paso County, Colorado, United States
- Seven Lakes, North Carolina, United States
- Sete Lagoas, city in Minas Gerais, Brazil
- Yedigöller National Park in Bolu province, Turkey
- Seven Rila Lakes area, Bulgaria
- Seven Lakes State Park in Holly, Michigan, United States

Others

- Road of the Seven Lakes, Argentine Patagonia
- Seven Lakes Drive, New York state, United States
- Seven Lakes High School, Fort Bend County, Texas, United States
