= Iskanderkul =

Lake in Tajikistan

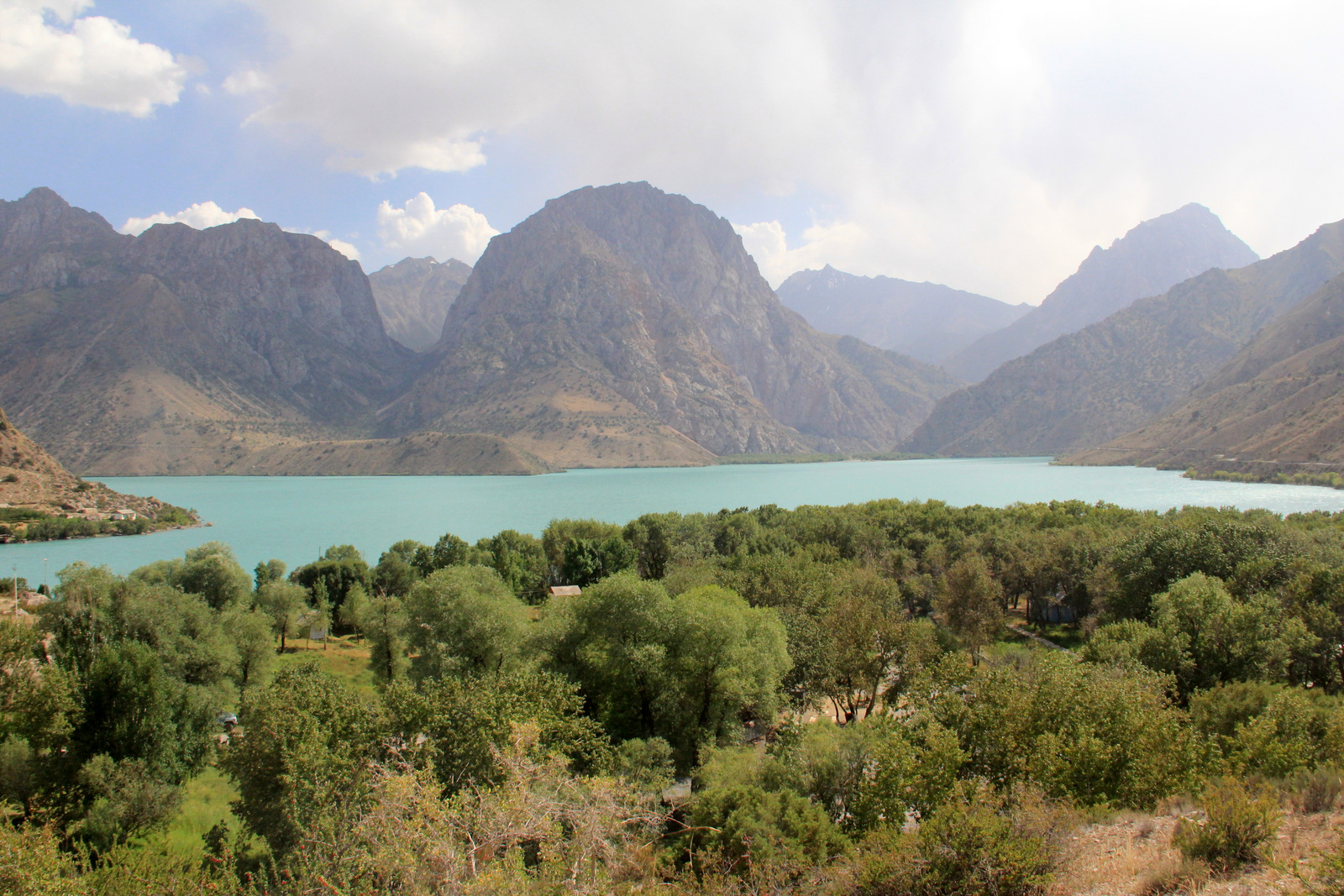

- Location within Tajikistan
- Interactive map of Iskanderkul
- Location: Gissar Range, Fann Mountains
- Coordinates: 39°04′21″N 68°21′59″E
- Type: glacial lake
- Primary inflows: Sarytag, Khazormech, Serima
- Primary outflows: Iskander Darya
- Basin countries: Tajikistan
- Surface area: 3.4 square kilometres (1.3 sq mi)
- Max. depth: 72 metres (236 ft)
- Surface elevation: 2,195 metres (7,201 ft)

Iskanderkul (Russian: Искандеркуль; Tajik: Искандаркӯл) is a mountain lake of glacial origin in Tajikistan's Sughd Province. It lies at an altitude of 2,195 metres (7,201 ft) on the northern slopes of the Gissar Range in the Fann Mountains. Triangular in shape, it has a surface area of 3.4 square kilometres (1.3 sq mi) and is up to 72 metres (236 ft) deep. Formed by a landslide that blocks the Saratogh river, the outflow of the lake is called the Iskander Darya, which joins the Yaghnob River to form the Fan Darya, a major left tributary of the Zeravshan River.

134 km from Dushanbe and 23 km from the Dushanbe—Khujand road, Iskanderkul is a popular tourist destination.

The lake takes its name from Alexander the Great's passage in Tajikistan: Iskander is the Persian pronunciation of Alexander, and kul means lake in many Turkic languages. There are two legends connecting the lake to Alexander. The first one states it used to be a location the inhabitants of which resisted Alexander's rule, and in fury, the king ordered to divert a river and annihilate them. The second legend states that Bucephalus had drowned in the lake.

== Birds ==
A 300 square kilometres (120 sq mi) tract of land including the lake and surrounding mountains has been designated a nature reserve. As well as the lake itself, habitats found in the reserve include rivers, water meadows, broad-leaved and juniper forests, mountain shrubland and sub-alpine meadows.

Over half of the reserve, comprising 177 square kilometres (68 sq mi), has been identified by BirdLife International as an Important Bird Area because it supports significant numbers of the populations of various bird species, either as residents, or as breeding or passage migrants. These include Himalayan snowcocks, saker falcons, cinereous vultures, yellow-billed choughs, Hume's larks, sulphur-bellied warblers, wallcreepers, Himalayan rubythroats, white-winged redstarts, white-winged snowfinches, alpine accentors, rufous-streaked accentors, brown accentors, water pipits, fire-fronted serins, plain mountain finches, crimson-winged finches, red-mantled rosefinches and white-winged grosbeaks.
