= Piniyon =

Piniyon Пинён (Russian and Tajik)
- Location in Tajikistan
- Coordinates: 39°13′11″N 68°29′52″E
- Country: Tajikistan
- Region: Sughd Region
- District: Ayni District
- Official languages: Russian (Interethnic); Tajik (State) (Note: Constitution of Tajikistan)

Piniyon (Russian and Tajik: Пинён), is a village in north-western Tajikistan. It is part of the jamoat Fondaryo in Ayni District, Sughd Region.

It is located on the left bank of the river Nasruddarya, a left tributary of the Fan Darya.
