= Fondaryo =

- Jamoat
- Location in Tajikistan
- Coordinates: 39°13′N 68°31′E
- Country: Tajikistan
- Region: Sughd Region
- District: Ayni District

Population (2015)
  - Total: 9,478
- Time zone: UTC+5 (TJT)

Fondaryo is a jamoat in north-west Tajikistan. It is located in Ayni District in Sughd Region. The jamoat has a total population of 9,478 (2015). It takes its name from the river Fan Darya. It consists of 12 villages, including Dizhik, Kante, Khayronbed and Piniyon.
