= Kazakh invasion of Transoxiana =

Military campaign of the Kazakh Khanate against the Khanate of Bukhara

- Part of the Kazakh–Uzbek Wars and the Expansion of the Kazakh Khanate
Date	1598–1599
Location	Transoxiana, Uzbekistan
Result	Peace treaty
Territorial changes	Kazakhs annexed Turkistan, Tashkent & Samarkand; Uzbek victory at Bukhara & beginning of Kazakh retreat; Uzbek reconquest of the Zarafshan valley in 1599

Belligerents
Kazakh Khanate	Khanate of Bukhara

Commanders and leaders
(Kazakh Khanate) Tawakkul Khan (DOW) (Kazakh Khanate) Esim Sultan (Kazakh Khanate) Abu-l-Wasi biy †	(Khanate of Bukhara) Baqi Muhammad Khan (Khanate of Bukhara); Pir Muhammad Khan II (executed) (Khanate of Bukhara) Abd al-Mumin Khan X (Khanate of Bukhara) Muhammad Quli Sultan (executed) (Khanate of Bukhara) Sayid Muhammad Sultan † (Khanate of Bukhara) Muhammad Baqi Biy † (Khanate of Bukhara) Hazare Sultan †

Strength
90,000	100,000

Casualties and losses
Heavy	Heavy

The Kazakh invasion of Northern Bukhara, also known as the Kazakh invasion of Mā Warāʾ an-Nahr, was a military campaign of the Kazakh Khanate led by Tawakkul Khan against the Khanate of Bukhara, in 1598 and 1599.

== Campaign ==
The invasion of the Khanate of Bukhara was the idea of Kazakh Khan, Tawakkul. Khan was an ally of the Bukharans for much of the 1580s and 1590s. News of Abdullah Khan II's death early in 1598, followed by Abd al-Mu'min's death that June, inspired Tawakkul to assert himself.

In the winter of 1598, Tawakkul, with the army of the Kazakh Khanate, which consisted of Kazakhs, Karakalpaks, and Kyrgyz, moved south from Dasht-i Kipchak in the direction of Transoxiana. First, he captured Tashkent, and nearby settlements. The Syr Darya River and others fell without resistance. He moved forward south towards Samarkand. Having learned about the approach of Tawakkul, the population offered no resistance. They surrendered Samarkand to the Kazakhs and gave them their prince as a hostage.

Tawakkul remained briefly in Samarkand before heading west towards Dabusia and Bukhara. Khan left his brother Esim Sultan in Samarkand with a garrison of twenty thousand to govern the city, and the surrounding region.

Tawakkul Khan moved to besiege Bukhara with his army of 70,000–80,000. Pir-Muhammad Khan and Baki-sultan actively participated in battles against Tauekel Khan and often won victories. For about a month, both sides fought continuously. Baki-sultan demonstrated courage and loyalty to Pir-Muhammad Khan until Tauekel Khan, weakened by the battles, launched a sudden night attack on Pir-Muhammad Khan's camp. However, the army of Pir Muhammad Khan gave a decisive rebuff, and a fierce battle broke out. In this battle, Tauekel killed Sayyid Muhammad Sultan, a relative of Pir Muhammad Khan, and Muhammad Baki-atalyk-divanbegi, but he himself was wounded and did not achieve success. Having retreated to Tashkent, he soon died of illness.

== Results ==
From 1598, to 1599, after a series of military campaigns, the Kazakh khans established control over Fergana, and parts of Turkestan, including the Tashkent oasis. Fergana was returned, at the beginning of the 17th century, and other lands acquired by the Kazakhs remained under their control. Treaties concluded between the Uzbeks, and Kazakhs promised the Kazakhs that the Uzbek khans would not interfere in the affairs of the occupied lands.
