= Zarafshan =

Zarafshan, Zarafshon or Zeravshan may refer to:

- Zarafshan Bridge, Uzbekistan
- Zarafshan, Tajikistan
- Zarafshon, Uzbekistan
- Zarafshan Airport, Uzbekistan
- Zarafshan Glacier, in the Tajikistan part of Hissaro-Alay
- Zarafshon (river), in Tajikistan and Uzbekistan
- Zarafshan Range, in Tajikistan and Uzbekistan
- Nasser Zarafshan, Iranian novelist and attorney with long imprisonment on grounds of his human rights activities
