= Fann Mountains =

Mountains in Tajikistan

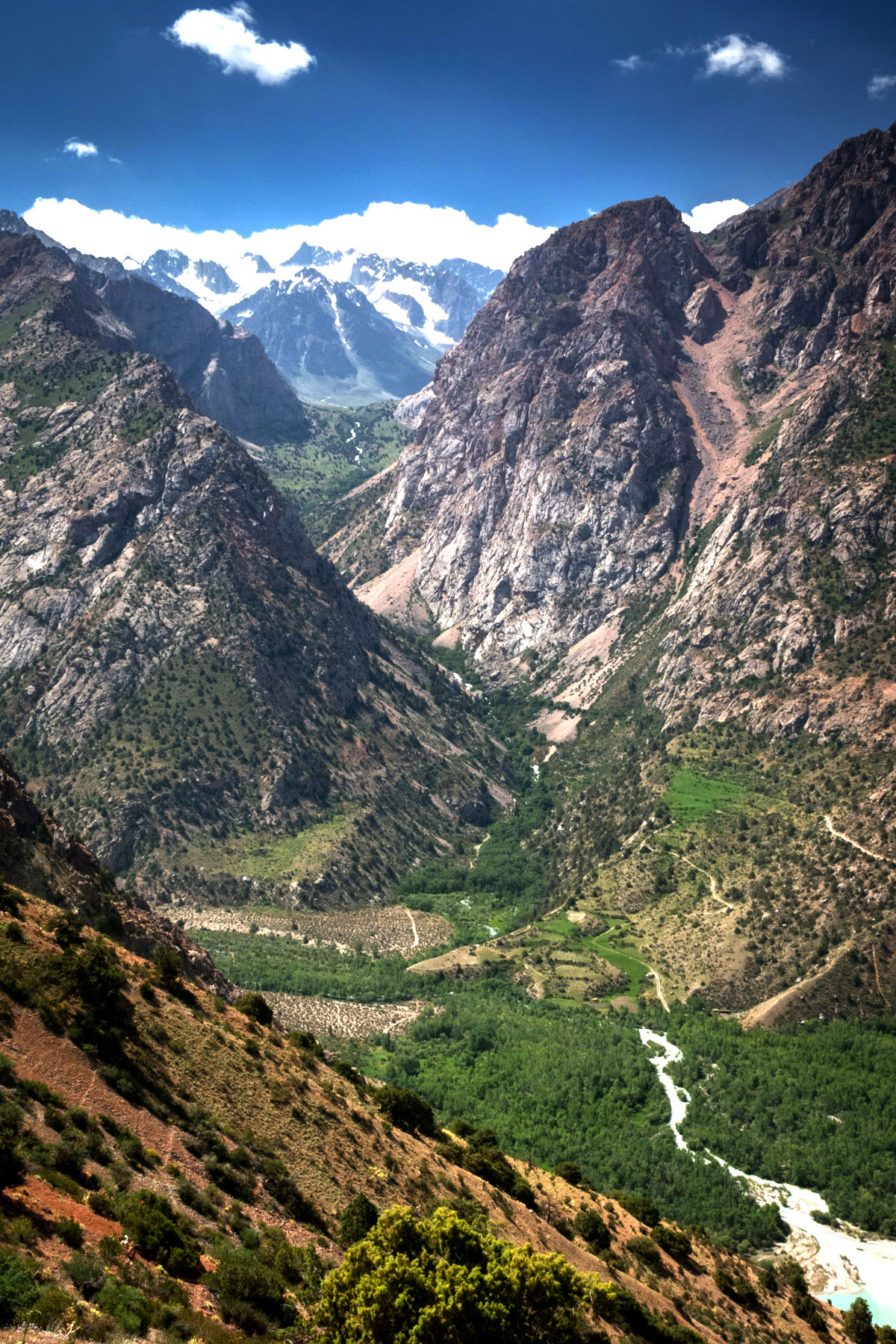

Highest point
- Parent peak: Chimtarga Peak
- Coordinates: 39°N 68°E

Naming
- Native name: Кӯҳҳои Фон (Tajik); Fon togʻlari (Uzbek)

Geography
- Location within Tajikistan Location within Uzbekistan Location within West and Central Asia
- Location: Tajikistan and Uzbekistan
- Parent range: Pamir-Alay

The Fann Mountains (Tajik: Кӯҳҳои Фон, romanized: Kúhhoi Fon) are part of the western Pamir-Alay mountain system in Tajikistan's Sughd Province, between the Zarafshan Range to the north and the Gissar Range to the south. In an east-west direction, they extend from the Fan Darya to the Archimaydan River.

== Peaks, lakes and access ==
The Fanns boast about a hundred peaks, with several rising to altitudes of more than 5,000 meters and relative elevations of up to 1,500 meters. The highest point in Fann Mountains is Chimtarga peak (5,489 m). Other 5,000-meter peaks are Bodkhona (5,138 m), Chapdara (5,050 m), Big Hansa, Little Hansa (5,031 m), Zamok ('5,070 m), Mirali (5,132 m), and Energia (5,120 m).

There are many lakes in the Fanns.The best known are Alaudin lakes in the Chapdara River valley, Kulikalon Lakes on the northern slope of Chimtarga peak, Big Allo Lake and Iskanderkul Lake.

There is a stunning mountain range in Western Tajikistan, near the city of Panjakent, which surprises tourists with its vivid, ever-changing colours. This are known as the Seven Lakes, Haftkul, or even Marguzor Lakes. In Tajik it means seven lakes (named after the largest lake in the group).

The best time for visiting is late June–mid-September for trekking and July–August for mountaineering, when the weather is usually at its best. Access is generally from Panjakent, which can be reached either from Dushanbe or Samarkand.

Fann Mountains Trekking

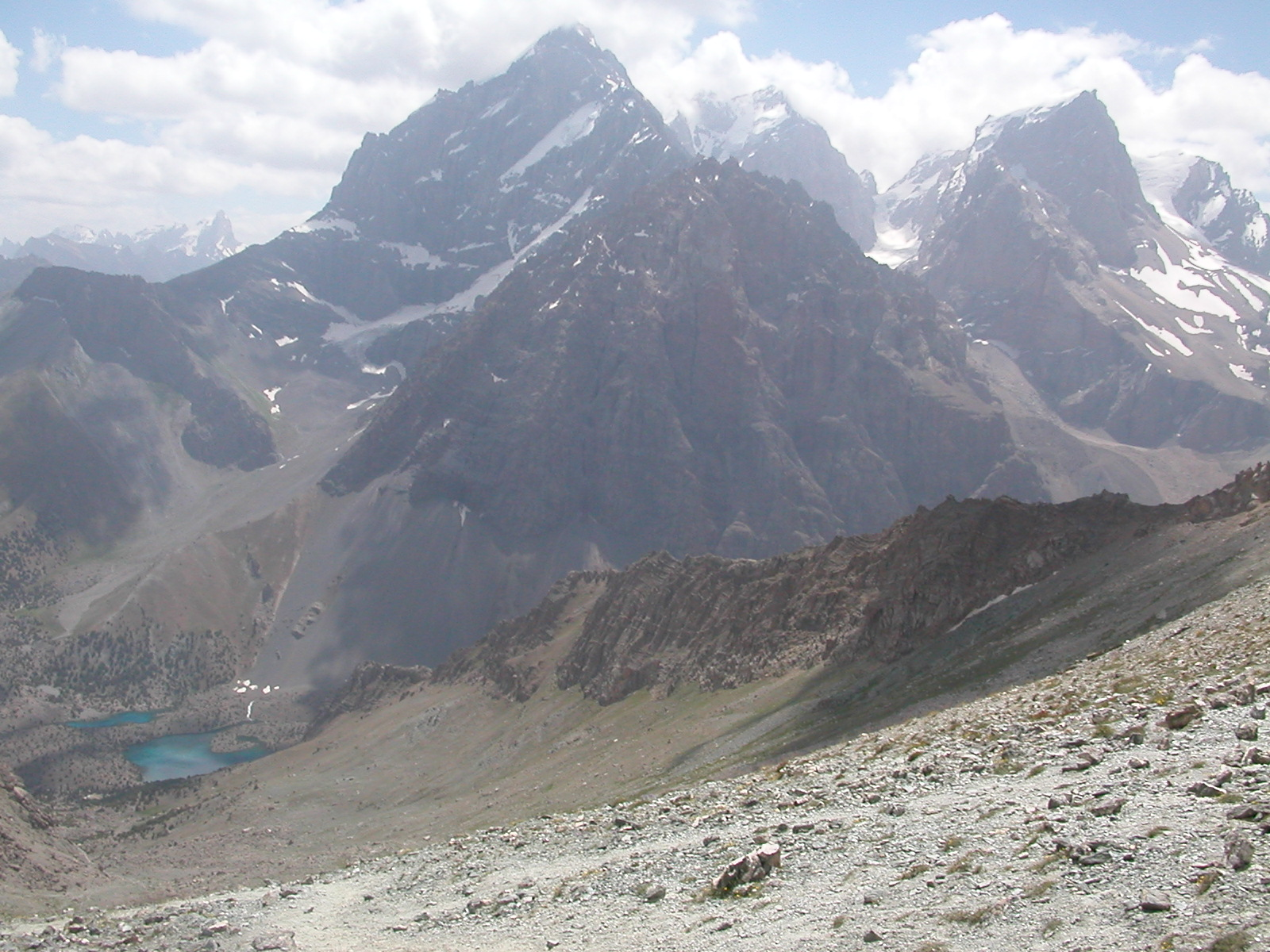
Chapdara and Bodhona Peaks

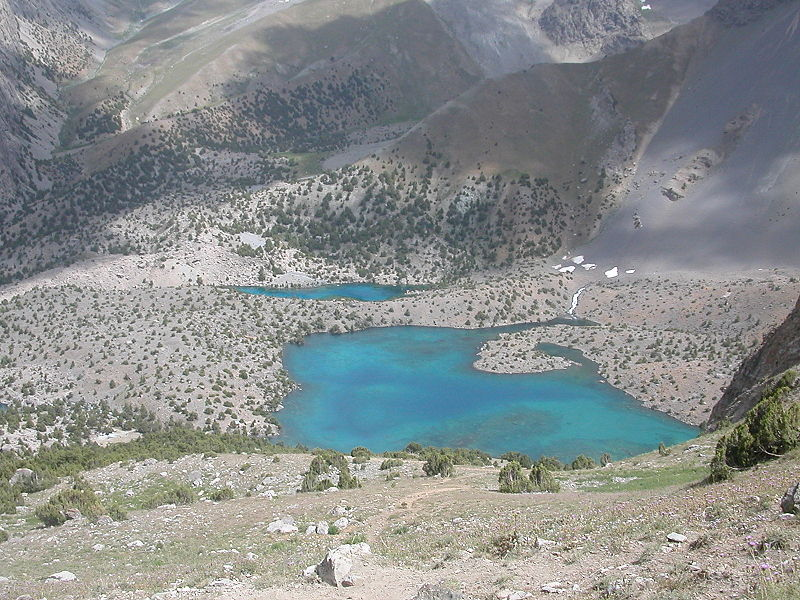
Alaudin lakes

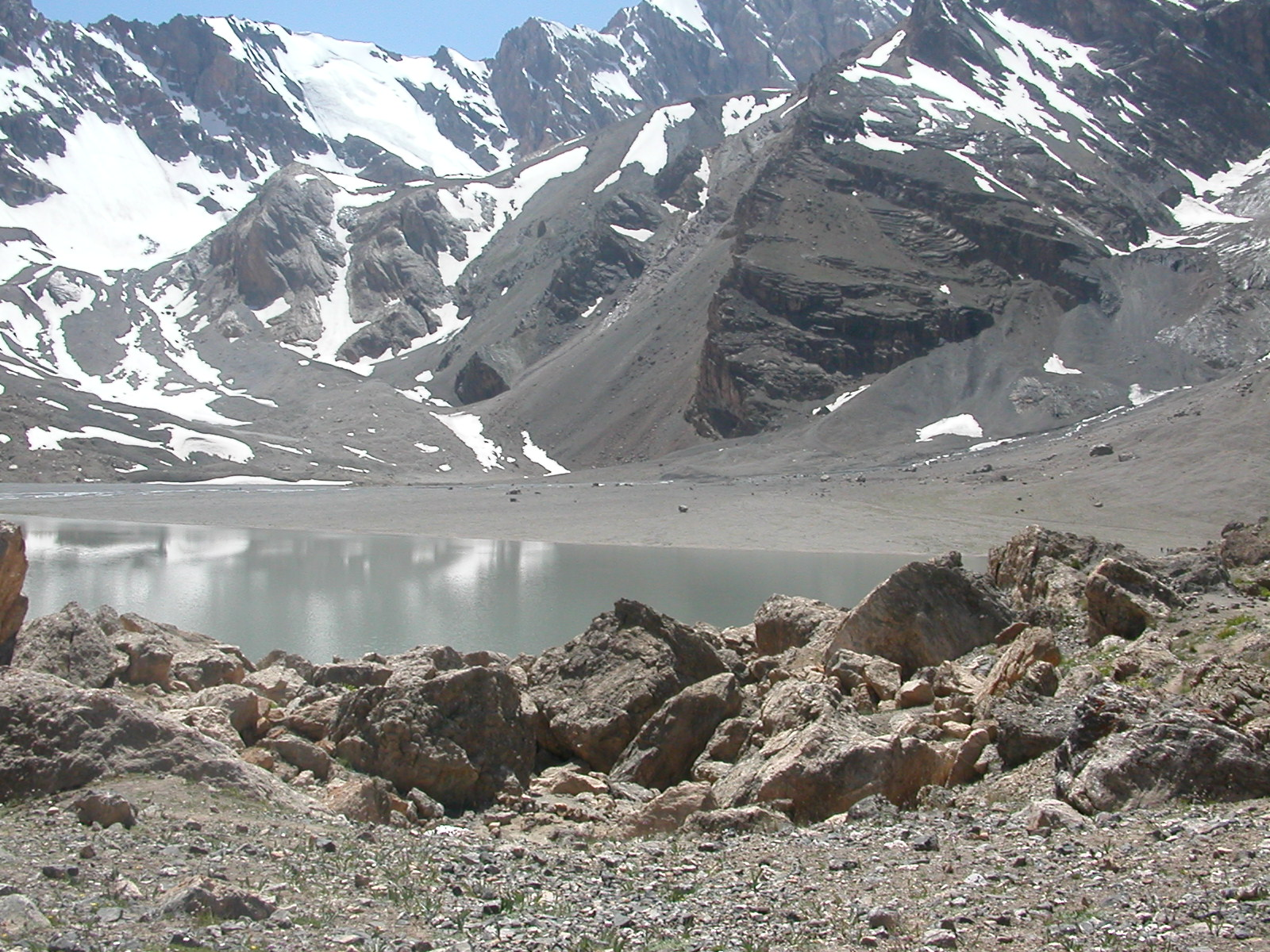
Lake Moutniy

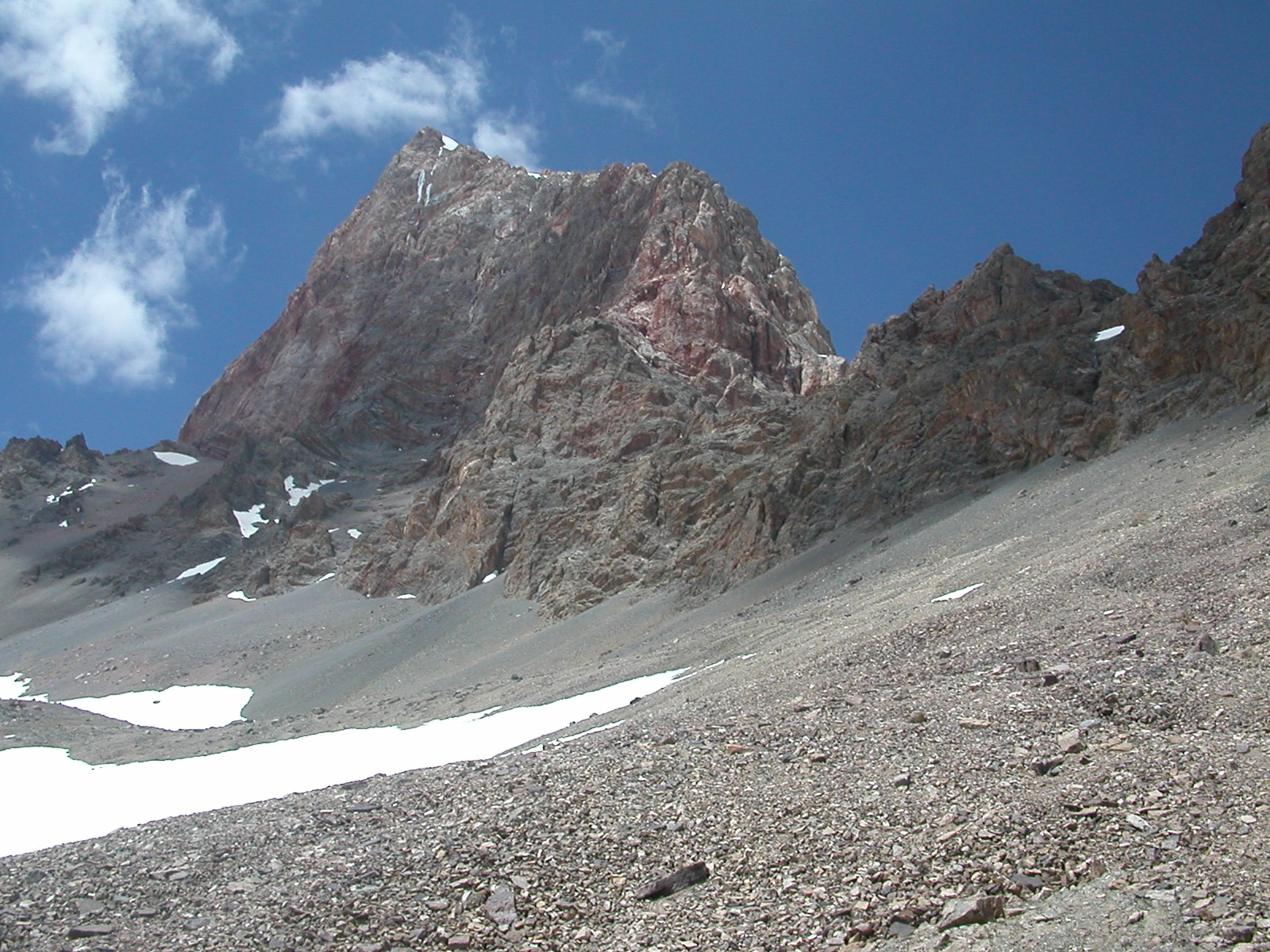
Chimtarga Peak

People of Fanns

Village in Fann Mountains

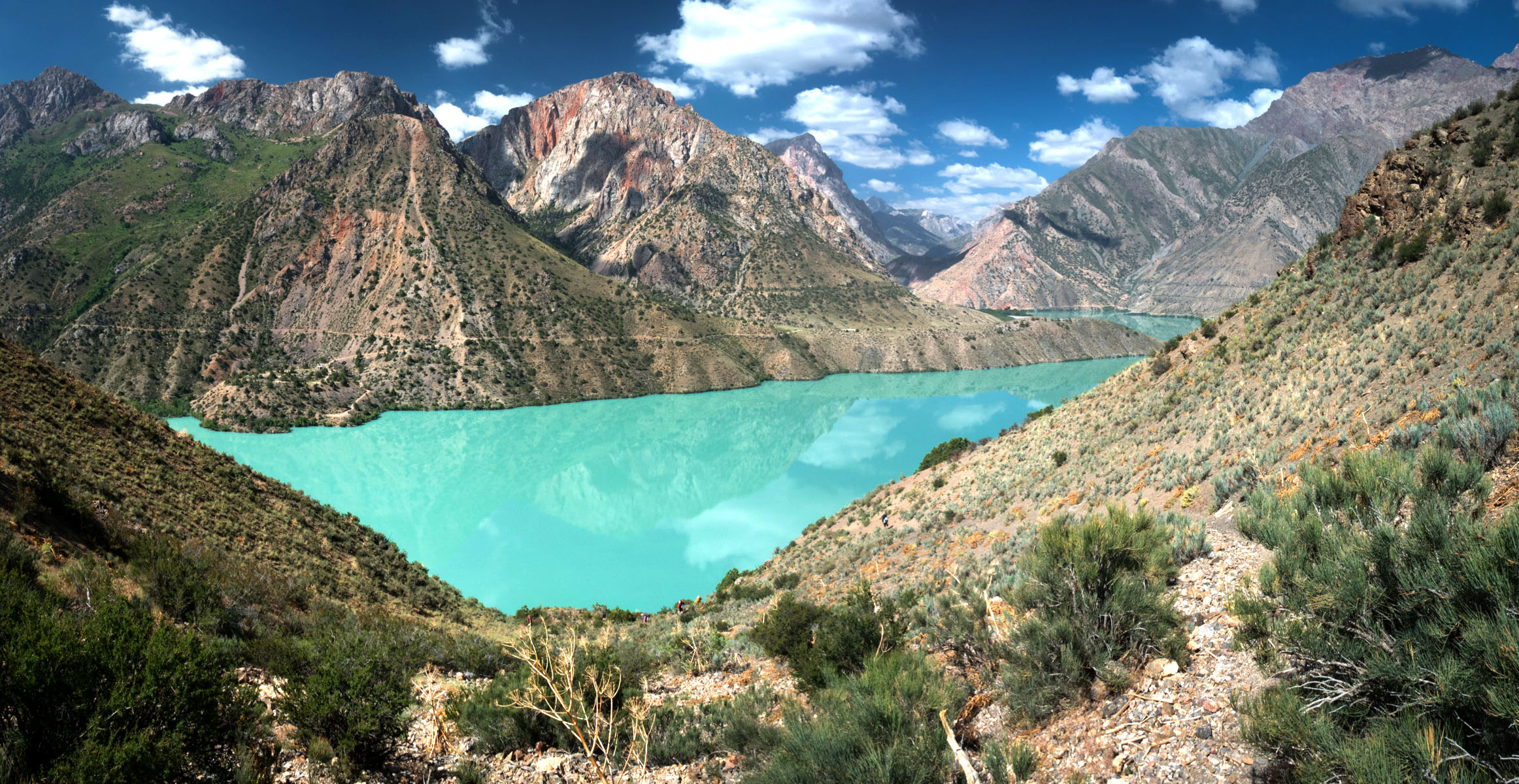
Iskanderkul

== See also ==
- Alay Mountains
- Pamir Mountains
