= Zarafshon (river) =

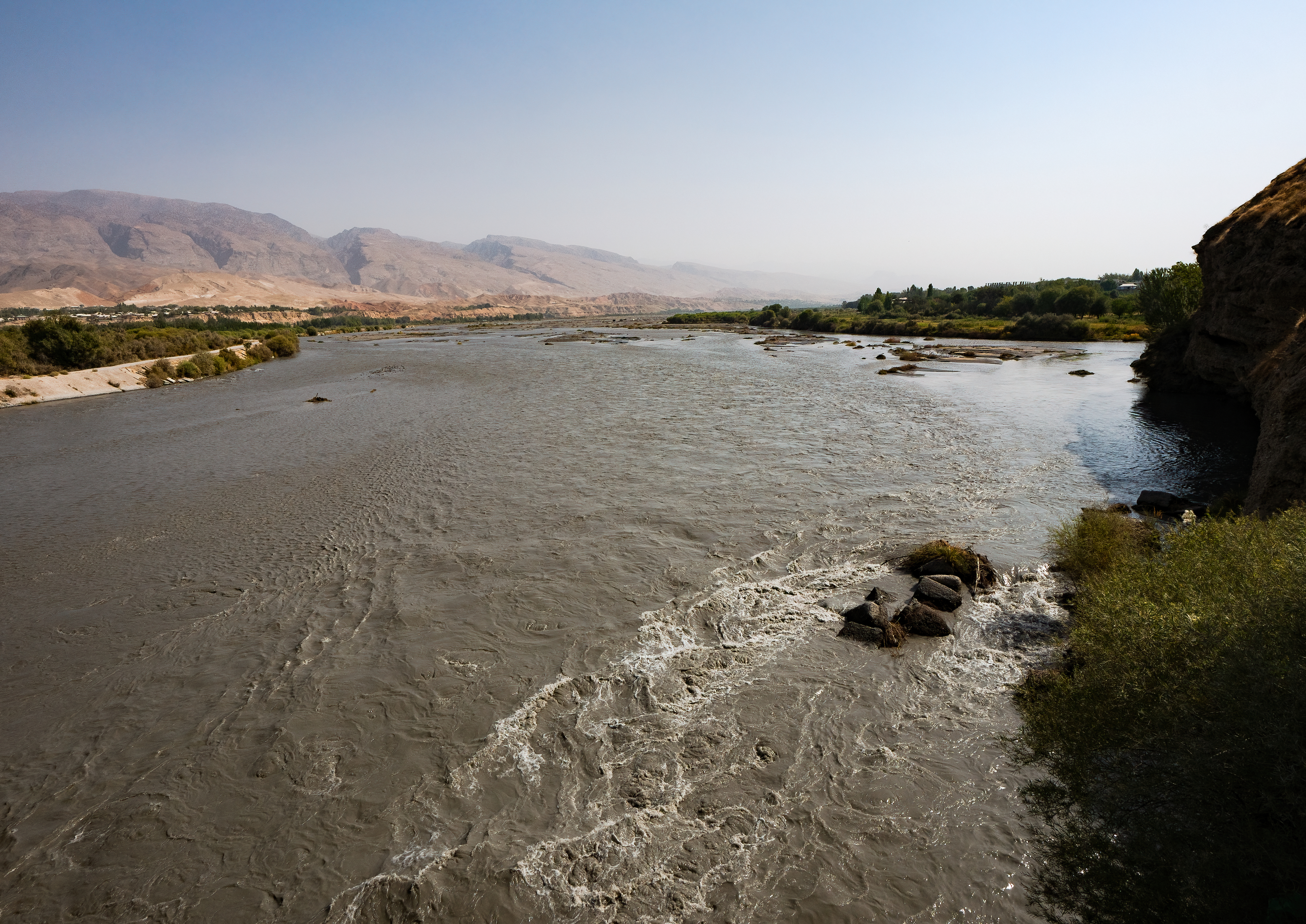
- River Zarafshon near Panjakent, Tajikistan

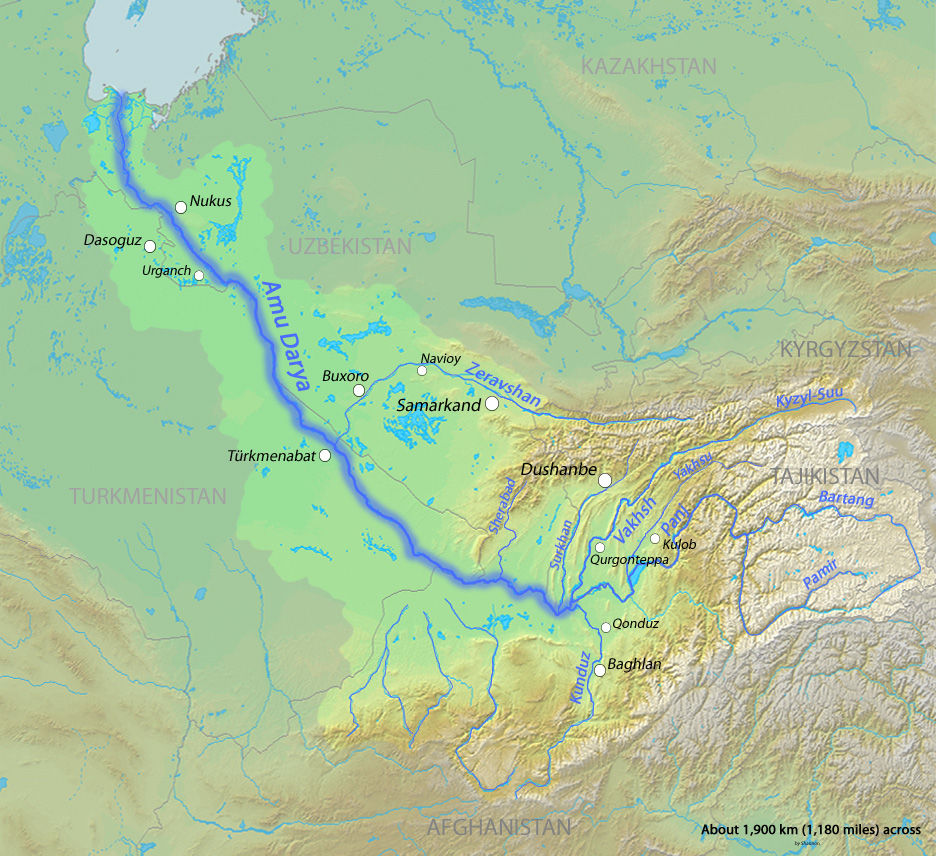
- The Zarafshon in the Amu Darya basin

- Mouth

Location
- Country: Tajikistan, Uzbekistan

Physical characteristics
- Source: Zeravshan Glacier
  - coordinates: 39°30′N 70°35′E
- Mouth: Qorakoʻl oasis
  - coordinates: 39.5477°N 63.869°E
- Length: 877 km (545 mi)
- Basin size: 17,700 km^{2} (6,800 sq mi)

Basin features
- Cities: Panjakent, Samarkand, Bukhara
- Tributaries
  - left: Fan Darya, Kshtut, Magiyan

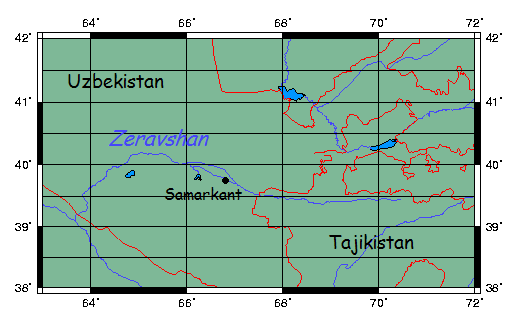
Location of Zeravshan River in Central Asia.

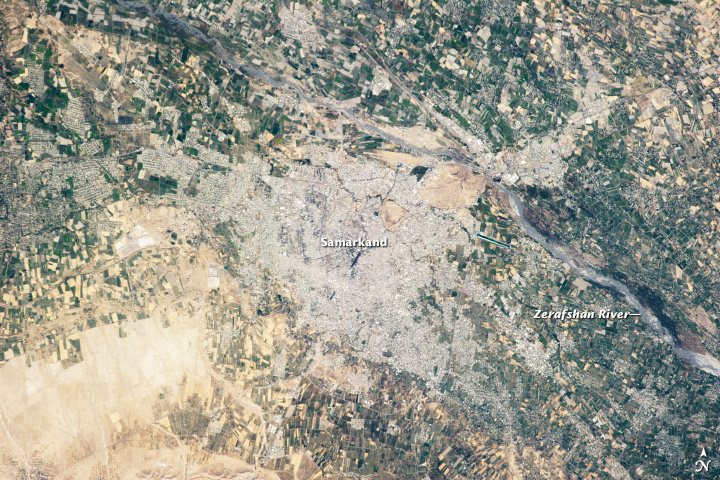
Zeravshan River and Samarkand from space.

The Zarafshon (Note: English: /ˌzærəfˈʃɒn/ ZARR-əf-SHON; Tajik: дарёи Зарафшон, romanized: daryoyi Zarafshon, arabized: درياى زرافشان, pronounced [dɐrˈjɔjɪ ˌzarʔɐfˈʃɔn]; Classical Persian: زرافشان Zar-afshān [ˌzarʔafˈʃaːn]; lit. 'Gold Spreader'; Uzbek: Zarafshon daryosi, arabized: زرافشان درياسى, pronounced [ˌzarʔɐfˈʃɔn dɐrˈjɔsɪ̆]) is a river in Tajikistan and Uzbekistan. Its name 'spreader of gold' in Persian refers to the presence of gold-bearing sands in the upper reaches of the river. It was known as the Polytimetus by the ancient Greeks. The river is known in Russian as Zeravshan, (Note: Зеравшан [zʲɪrɐfˈʂan]) and it was also formerly known as the Sughd River. The river is 877 kilometres (545 mi) long and has a basin area of 17,700 square kilometres (6,800 mi^{2}).

Zarafshan River valley is rich in archaeological sites. Human settlements in this area go back to Paleolithic times. During the Bronze Age, the mineral resources of the valley were discovered and gave rise to many prosperous settlements. It is the site of the ancient Battle of the Polytimetus.

== Geography ==
It rises at the Zarafshan Glacier, close to where the Turkestan Range and the Zeravshan Range of the Pamir-Alay mountains meet, in Tajikistan. In its upper course, upstream from its confluence with the Fan Darya, it is also called Matcha. It flows due west for some 300 kilometres (190 mi), passing Panjakent before entering Uzbekistan at 39°32′N 67°27′E, where it turns west-to-north-west, flowing past the legendary city of Samarkand, where it feeds the Dargom Canal, which is entirely dependent on the oasis thus created, until it bends left again to the west north of Navoiy and further to the south-west, passing Bukhara before it is lost in the desert beyond the city of Qorakoʻl (Karakul), not quite reaching the Amu Darya, of which it was formerly a tributary.

== Water use ==
Until the 1960s, the Bukhara oasis relied on the Zarafshon for irrigation water. As irrigated land expanded along the river's upper and middle reaches, less water reached Bukhara, and by the early 1960s the oasis was short 50 to 55 percent of its annual irrigation needs. The Amu-Bukhara canal was built to bring water from the Amu Darya instead; it was completed in the early 1970s, and agriculture in the oasis has depended on it since.

== Archaeology ==
=== In Uzbekistan ===
Settlements in Uzbekistan are known from the Neolithic period — the ancient site of Zaman-Baba, 27 km northwest of the city of Karakul, and the settlements of Khazarasp (2nd-3rd centuries) and Kumushkent (1st-5th centuries).

The city of Bukhara is located on the Zeravshan River at the fertile Bukhara oasis. At an elevation of 750 feet (ca 230 meters), it is in an arid region where the Zeravshan River fans out into an oasis. It was founded in the 6th century BC, and became a major Silk Road trading hub.

The ancient city of Samarkand was founded on the banks of the river around 700 BC. It is close to the Tajik border. Its name, of Persian origin, indicates the ancient knowledge of the gold-bearing sands of the river's upper reaches.

=== In Tajikistan ===
On the left bank of the Zeravshan River, close to Uzbek border, and 15 km west of the regional center of Penjikent, is the oldest settlement of the Eneolithic era (IV-II millennium BC) - Sarazm (the first World Heritage site in Tajikistan).

Also in Tajikistan is Mushiston (Mušiston), where major tin deposits were exploited already during Bronze Age.

The Roman writer Curtius Rufus, who lived in the first century CE, referring to Zeravshan River in his works used for it the Greek name "Polytimetus", which has generated much debate. This name, as Strabo once pointed out, was given to the river by the Macedonians and translated as "much-venerated." Chinese historians helped clarify this, calling the river "Nami," which echoes the Pahlavi name "Namik," meaning "noble," "venerated" (Ancient Persian "Nemakhya") and corresponds to the Greek "Polytimetus". The losing Battle of the Polytimetus was fought here by the Macedonian troops.

=== Tin mining ===
More recently some other Bronze Age sites in the area have been discovered. Large tin deposits have been identified on the Zerafshan River that have been worked in ancient times.

Sites like Karnab, and Lapas (Uzbekistan) have significant tin deposits, and date to the middle 2nd millennium BC. These deposits attracted ancient miners linked to Andronovo-Tazabagjab culture, who founded some settlements in the area such as Kimirek-Kum 1, which has been investigated by an international research team in the 2020s.

Copper processing and other material culture have also been linked to the Tugai excavation site, several kilometers downstream on the Zerafshan River in Uzbekistan.

The tin deposits are also known at Mushiston (Mušiston) which is in Tajikistan, high up in the mountains and close to Uzbekistan border. Radiocarbon dating of items from underground galleries of the Mušiston deposit indicate a period between 1900 and 1400 BCE, which corresponds to the Late Bronze Age in this region.

Mušiston is situated in the Zeravšan-Gissar mountain range, in the Kaznok River valley, which is connected with the Zeravšan valley through a mountain river system, thus providing the only access to Mušiston. But because Mušiston is located about 3000m above sea level, it was a lot harder to access than the low lying mines in the Zeravšan valley.

According to scientific analyses, approximately 30% of tin in the famous Uluburun shipwreck (in the eastern Mediterranean, dated to 14th century BC) comes from the Mušiston deposit (and maybe from the Zeravshan valley deposits). These deposits are believed to provide a generally better quality tin, compared to those in Turkey. However, these views were criticized by some other scholars.

Tazabagyab culture flourished in the lower Zeravshan valley in the second millennium BC.

Located near Sarazm and Tugai, the elite burial at Zardcha-Khalifa yielded Sintashta-Petrovka style disc-shaped bone cheekpieces and the earliest known solid bronze horse bits. It dates to the beginning of the 2nd millennium BCE, belonging to the Namazga V period, which correlates to Oxus Civilization (BMAC).

== See also ==
- History of Bukhara
- Zarafshon, a city in Uzbekistan's Navoiy Region, called "the gold capital of Uzbekistan".
- Zarafshan (disambiguation)
- Zarafshan Bridge
