= Qorakoʻl District =

Coordinates: 39.509868°N 63.846016°E

Qorakoʻl District Qorakoʻl tumani Қоракўл тумани
- District
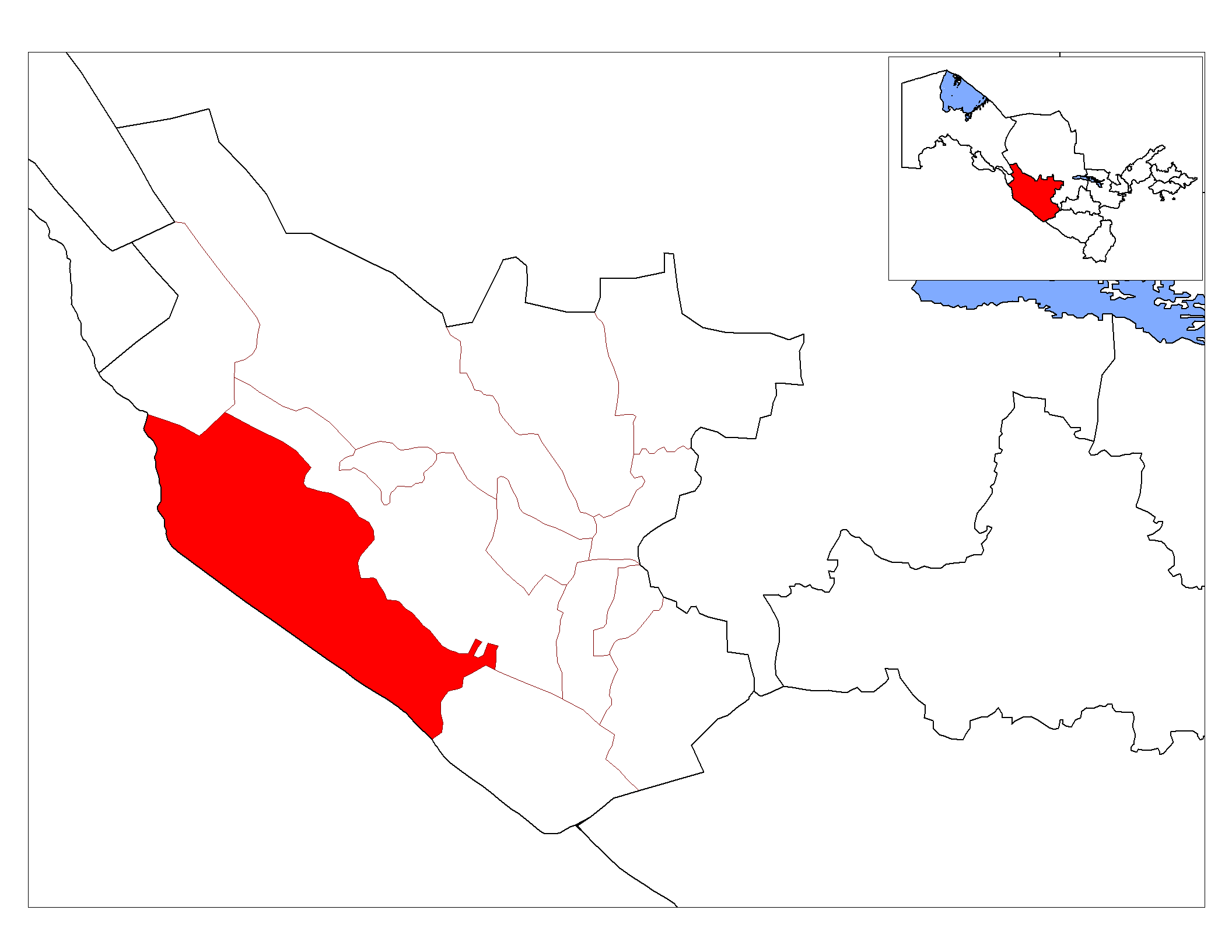
- Country: Uzbekistan
- Region: Bukhara Region
- Capital: Qorakoʻl

Area
  - Total: 8,690 km^{2} (3,360 sq mi)

Population (2021)
  - Total: 167,400
  - Density: 19.3/km^{2} (49.9/sq mi)
- Time zone: UTC+5 (UZT)

Qorakoʻl District (Uzbek: Qorakoʻl tumani/Қоракўл тумани) is a district of Bukhara Region in Uzbekistan. The capital lies at the city Qorakoʻl. It has an area of 8,690 km^{2} (3,360 sq mi) and its population is 167,400 (2021).

The district consists of 1 city (Qorakoʻl), 12 urban-type settlements (Bandboshi, Dargʻabogʻi, Jigʻachi, Qorahoji, Quvvacha, Mirzaqala, Sayyod, Solur, Chandirobod, Shoʻrabot, Yakka A'lam, Yangiqala) and 16 rural communities.
