= Fan Darya =

River in Tajikistan

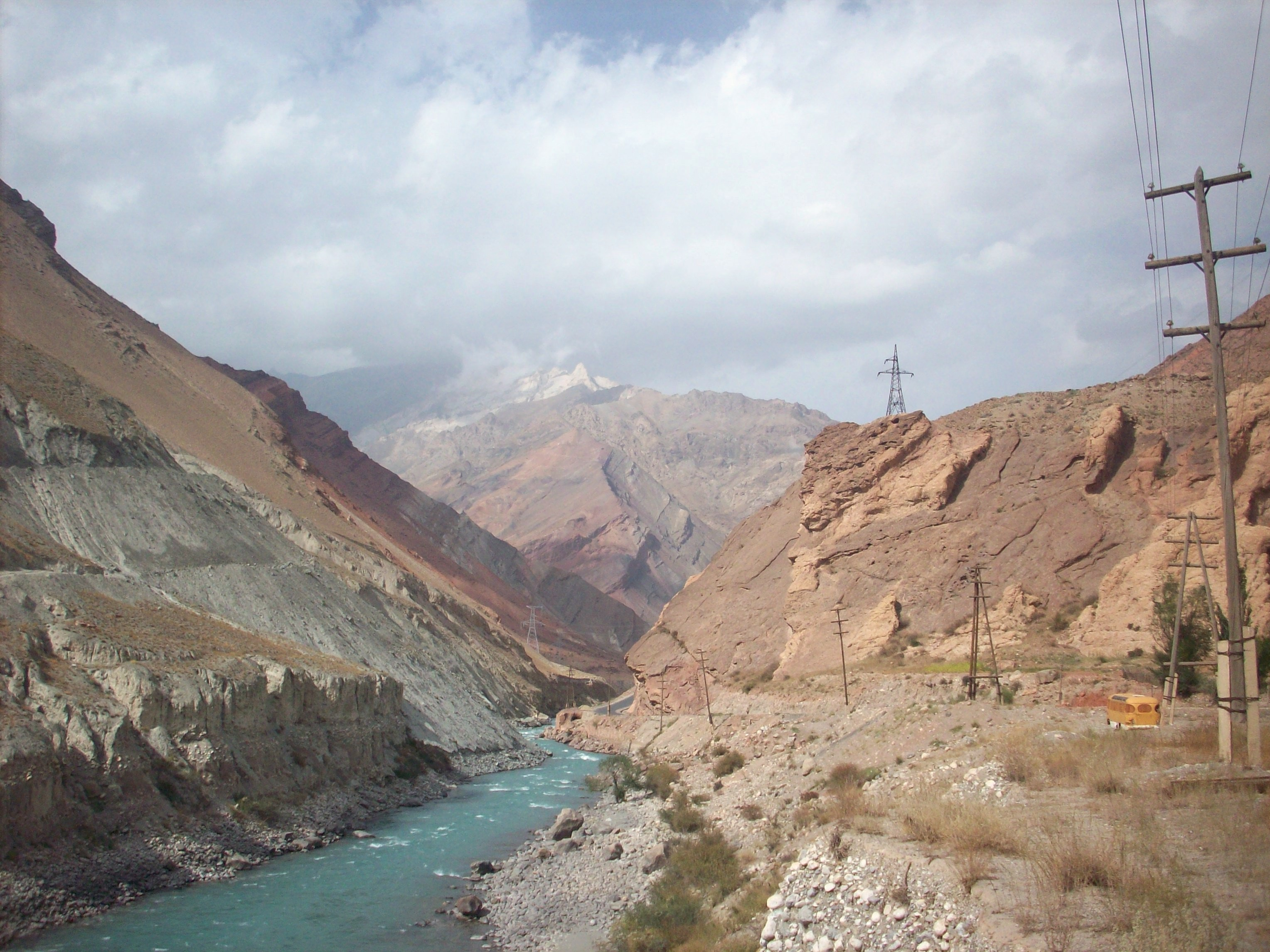

Location
- Country: Tajikistan

Physical characteristics
- Source: confluence of Yaghnob and Iskander Darya
- Mouth: Zeravshan
  - coordinates: 39°22′59″N 68°33′01″E
- Length: 24 km (15 mi)
- Basin size: 3,230 km^{2} (1,250 sq mi)
- Discharge
  - average: 62.6 m^{3}/s (2,210 cu ft/s)

Basin features
- Progression: Zeravshan→ Qorakoʻl oasis

The Fan Darya (Russian: Фандарья) is a river located in Ayni District of Sughd Region, Tajikistan. The Fan Darya is 24 kilometres (15 mi) long (140 km including its source river Yaghnob), and the area of its drainage basin is 3,230 square kilometres (1,250 mi^{2}). It is a major left tributary of the Zeravshan.

The Fan Darya is formed at the confluence of the rivers Yaghnob, which flows west from the Yaghnob Valley, and the Iskander Darya, which has its source in Lake Iskanderkul and flows east. Both the Yaghnob and the Iskander Darya drain the valleys between the Zeravshan Range to the north, the Gissar Range to the south and the Fan Mountains to the west. The Fan Darya flows north, crosses the Zeravshan Range and joins the river Zeravshan near the town of Ayni.

The M34 highway, which connects Dushanbe with Tashkent, follows the whole course of Fan Darya through the gorge to Ayni.

The drainage basin of the Fan Darya is confined between the Zeravshan and the Gissar ranges. These ranges are connected in the west by the Fann Mountains, and in the east by the Matcha Mountains. The lakes and rivers lying in this area, including Iskanderkul, drain into the Fan Darya.
