= Nikolai Rozenbakh =

Russian general

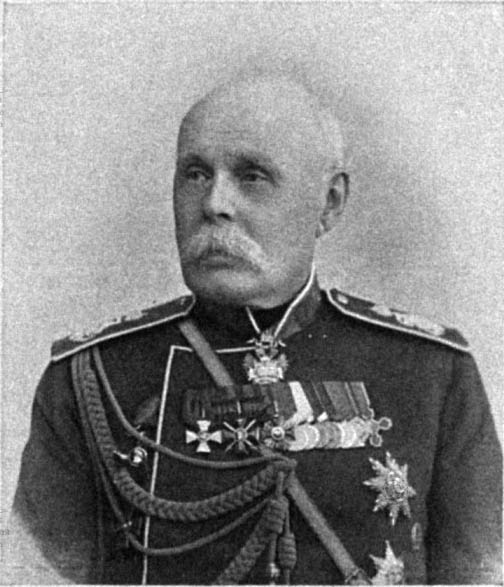
Nikolai Ottonovich von Rozenbakh

Nikolai Ottonovich von Rozenbakh (Николай Оттонович фон Розенбах) (12 June 1836 in Püssi – 5 May 1901 in Petersburg) was a Russian General during the nineteenth century.

He was Governor-General of the Guberniya of Russian Turkestan and commander of the Turkestan Military District from 1884 to 1889.

In 1884, Regel in 'Trudy Imperatorskago St. Peterburgskago Botaniceskago Sada' Vol.3, published Iris rosenbachiana, it was found in Turkestan and named after Rozenbakh.
