= Khayronbed =

- Location in Tajikistan
- Coordinates: 39°8′35″N 68°27′54″E
- Country: Tajikistan
- Region: Sughd Region
- District: Ayni District

Khayronbed (Tajik: Ҳайронбед Hayronbed) is a village in Sughd Region, northern Tajikistan. It is part of the jamoat Fondaryo in the Ayni District.
