= Siypantosh Rock Paintings =

Tentative World Heritage Site in Uzbekistan

The Siypantosh Rock Paintings are located throughout the southwestern portion of the Zarafshan mountains, Kashkadarya Region, Uzbekistan.

== Site description ==
The rock paintings are situated on the concave rock faces of granite-diorite outcrops. Images were painted in black, yellow and red-brown pigments, and include foot-shaped designs, a bull with curved horns, various animals, small hand prints, among others.

== World Heritage Status ==
This site was added to the UNESCO World Heritage Tentative List on in the Cultural category.
