= Pik Skalisty (Kyrgyzstan) =

Mountain in Kyrgyzstan

- Russian: Пик Скалистый
- Location within Kyrgyzstan

Highest point
- Elevation: 5,621 m (18,442 ft)
- Prominence: 2,095 m (6,873 ft)
- Isolation: 92.99 km (57.78 mi)
- Coordinates: 39°37′10″N 70°43′8″E

Geography
- Location: Batken Region, Kyrgyzstan
- Parent range: Kara-Bel Range, Pamir-Alay

Pik Skalisty (Russian: Пик Скалистый; Kyrgyz: Аскалы чокусу) is the highest peak in the Kara-Bel Range, Pamir-Alay in Kyrgyzstan.

It is located in the Batken Region of Kyrgyzstan, 7 km from the border of Tajikistan.

== See also ==
- List of Ultras of Central Asia
- Pamir Mountains
