= Zarafshan Range =

Mountain range in Tajikistan and Uzbekistan

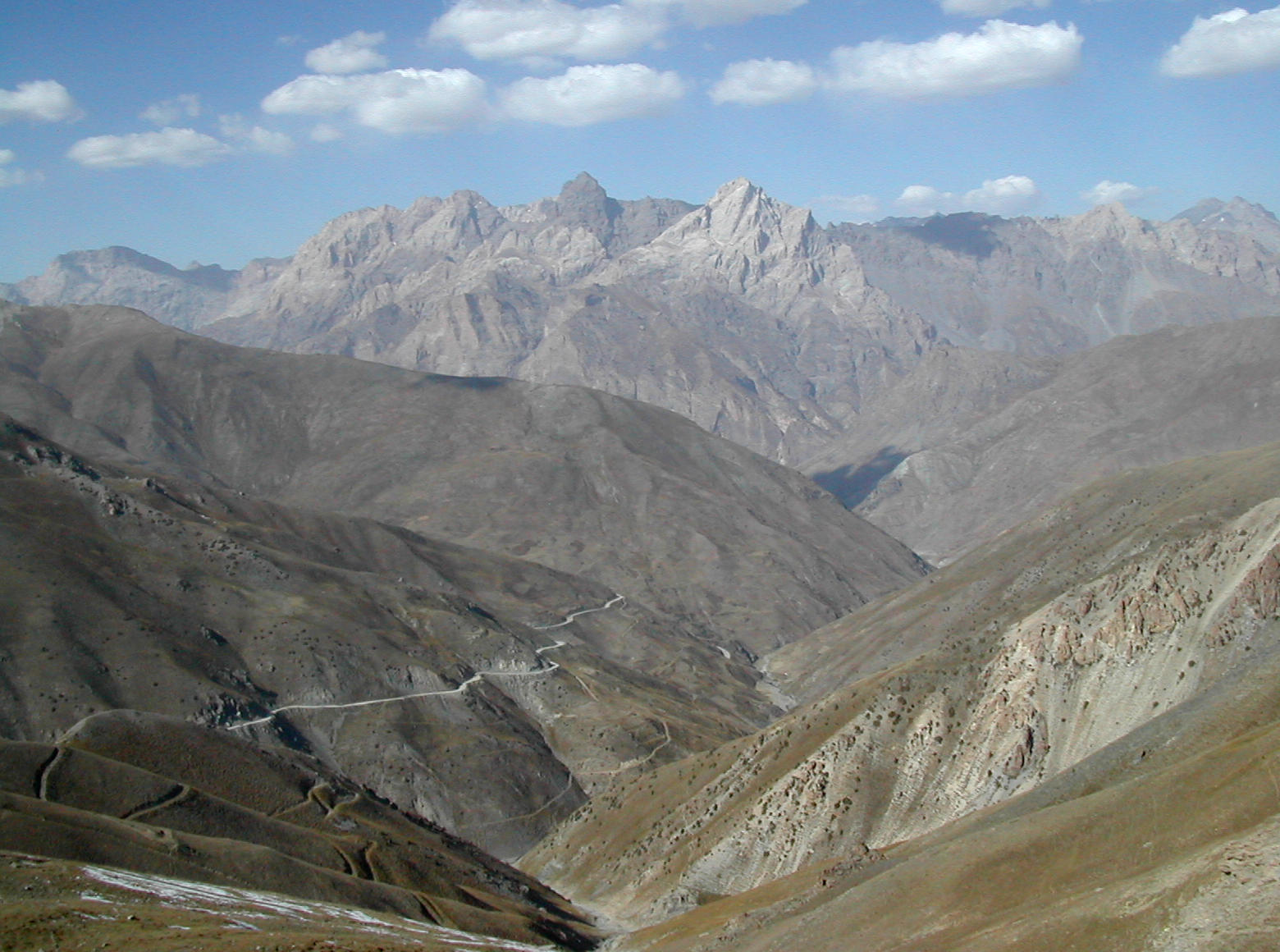
- Part of the Zarafshan Range seen from Anzob Pass

Highest point
- Peak: Chimtarga Peak
- Elevation: 5,489 m (18,009 ft)
- Coordinates: 39°20′N 69°40′E

Dimensions
- Length: 230 mi (370 km) East–West

Naming
- Native name: Қаторкӯҳҳои Зарафшон (Tajik); Зеравшанский хребет (Russian); Zarafshon (Uzbek)

Geography
- Location within Tajikistan
- Countries: Tajikistan and Uzbekistan
- Parent range: Pamir-Alay

The Zarafshan Range, (Note: Tajik: Қаторкӯҳ(ҳо)и Зарафшон, romanized: Qatorko'h(ho)yi Zarafshon, IPA: [qɐtʰɔɾ(ˈ)kʰɵ(ˈhɔ)jɪ zɐɾɐfˈʃɔn]; Uzbek: Зарафшон тизмаси, romanized: Zarafshon tizmasi, IPA: [zæɾæɸˈʃɒn tʰɪzmæˈsɪ̆]) formerly the Zeravshan Range, (Note: Russian: Зеравшанский хребет, romanized: Zeravšanskij hrebet, IPA: [zʲɪrɐfˈʂanskʲɪj xrʲɪˈbʲet]; From Persian زرافشان Zarafšân; lit. 'Gold-Sprayer'.) is a mountain range in Tajikistan and Uzbekistan, part of the Pamir-Alay mountains. Almost all of the range belongs to the drainage basins of the Zarafshan River.

The Persian name is believed to possibly be a reference to gold found in bed of the Zarafshan River and its tributaries, which has ushered prosperity to the region from ancient times.

== Geography and geology ==
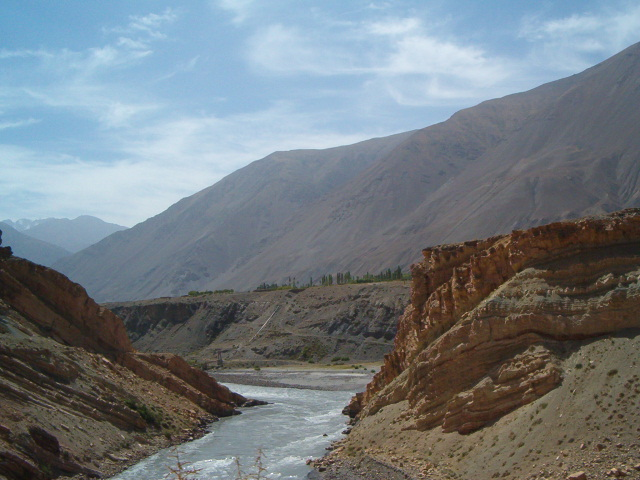
The Zarafshan River

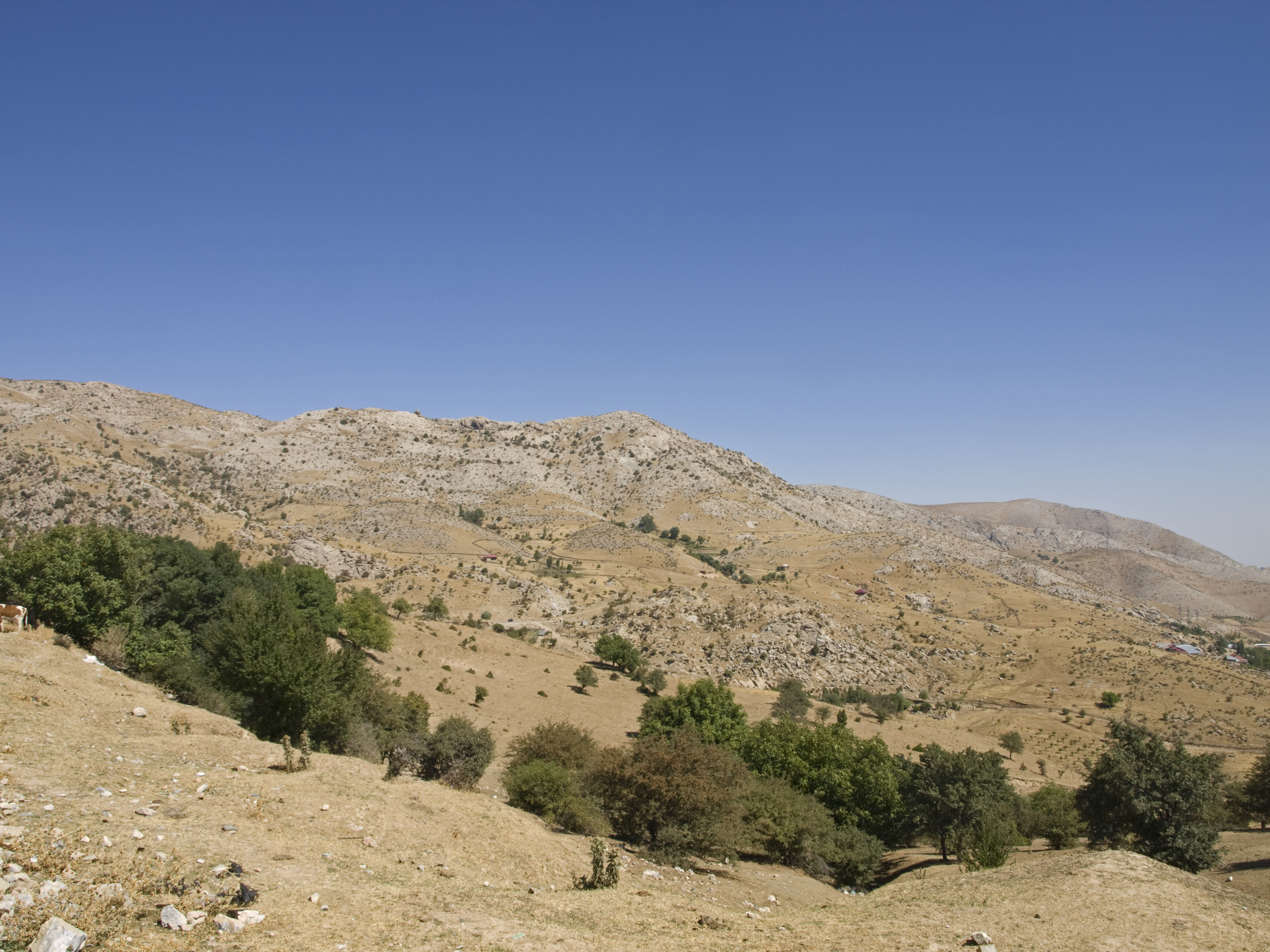
View from the Takhta-Karacha Pass on the M39 between Samarkand and Shahrisabz.

The range extends over 370 kilometres (230 mi) in an east−west direction along the south of Sughd Region in Tajikistan, reaching the highest point of 5,489 metres (18,009 ft) (Chimtarga Peak) in its central part. South-west of Panjakent the range crosses from Tajikistan into Uzbekistan, where it continues at decreasing elevations (1,500–2,000 metres (4,900–6,600 ft)) along the internal border between Samarkand and Kashkadarya Regions provinces, until it blends into the desert south-west of Samarkand.

There are two other mountain ranges running in an east−west direction parallel to the Zarafshan Range. To the north, the Zeravshan Valley runs east for approximately 250 kilometres (160 mi) from Samarkand and separates the Zarafshan Range from the Turkestan Range. To the south, the Hisar range runs parallel to the Zarafshan Range. To the west of Lake Iskanderkul, the Zarafshan Range and the Gissar Range are connected by the Fann Mountains, which is the highest part of both ranges.

The Zarafshan Range is crossed in the meridional direction by three rivers: the Fan Darya, the Kashtutu Darya, and the Maghian Darrya, all of which flow north and are left tributaries of the Zarafshan. The part of the Zarafshan Range east of the Fan Darya is known as the Matcha Range. It has heights around 5 kilometres (16,000 ft) and in the east, it is connected to the Alay Range and the Turkestan Range. This point (the Matcha Mountains) is the location of the Zarafshan Glacier, which is 24.75 kilometres (15.38 mi) long and is one of the longest glaciers of the Central Asia. The northern slopes of the Matcha Range are relatively smooth and descend to the Zarafshan, whereas the southern slopes sharply drop to the valley of the Yaghnob River.

The highest part of the range is located between the Fan Darya and the Kashtutu Darya and includes the Fann Mountains. The western part of the range is up to 3 kilometres (9,800 ft) and is forested. The southern slopes of the western part of the ridge belong to the drainage basin of the Kashka Darya, which rises in the range's southern watershed. The river terminates between Panjakent and Lake Karakul. Water is precious in the region and is utilized for irrigation − an irrigation system that has developed involves 85 main canal totalling a length of 2,530 kilometres (1,570 mi).

There are several passes crossing the range, including Akhba-Tavastfin, Akhba-Bevut, Akhba-Guzun, Akhba-Surkltat, Darkh Pass, Minora, and Marda-Kishtigeh. Various elevations include 3,550 metres (11,650 ft) at Kshtut Pass, 5,600 metres (18,400 ft) at Mount Chandara, and 4,600 metres (15,100 ft) at Mount Hazret Sultan. Fan Darya makes a gorge going across the ridge. The road connecting Dushanbe and Khujand is built in the ridge.

The geological formations in the mountains of the upper Zarafshan Valley contain minerals such as coal, iron, gold alum and sulphur. Gold is reported from the entire course of the Fan Darya, Kashtutu Darya, and Maghian Darya.

== History ==
The slopes of the range have been populated since antiquity. Prehistoric Siypantosh Rock Paintings are preserved in the Uzbek portion of the range. In about 400 BC, they belonged to the Iranian civilization of Sogdiana. In 330 BC, during the Asian Campaign, troops of Alexander the Great reached the Zarafshan Valley. The name of Lake Iskanderkul clearly originates from the name of Alexander - Iskander; however, attempts to place a connection between the lake and the campaign only exist at the level of legend. Together with the rest of Western Tajikistan, the Zarafshan Range has changed hands several times, being part of the Hephthalite Empire, the Umayyad Caliphate, and the Samanid Empire. In the 13th century, it was taken over by the Mongols, and in the 16th century, became part of the Khanate of Bukhara. The Zarafshan, Yaghnob, and Fan Darya valleys were essentially controlled by local authorities (beks). The fortress of Sarvoda (Ayni, Ayni District) was built to protect the gorge of the Fan Darya.

In 1862, the Russian Empire started to penetrate to Central Asia. By 1870, Russian troops occupied both the Zarafshan and the Yaghnob valleys, with the last operation being the Iskanderkul Expedition in the spring of 1870, under the command of the Major General Alexander Abramov. During the expedition, Russian troops took the Yaghnob Valley under control. After 1870, military topographers started to map the mountains, including the Zarafshan Range. In 1870, Alexey Fedchenko lead an expedition to the Zarafshan Valley, and in 1880, Ivan Mushketov discovered the Zarafshan Glacier and investigated the upper part of the valley. In 1892, Vladimir Komarov investigated the Yaghnob valley.

In 1868, Zarafshan Okrug was split from the Emirate of Bukhara. The Okrug was controlled by Russian authorities, but the authority at the local level remained with the beks. The whole Zarafshan Range was inside the okrug. On January 1, 1887 Samarkand Oblast was established, with the administrative center in Samarkand. In 1924, Samarkand Oblast was abolished and split between newly established Uzbek Soviet Socialist Republic and Tajik Autonomous Soviet Socialist Republic, corresponding to the contemporary division between Uzbekistan and Tajikistan.

== Population ==
All valleys of the range are populated. There are no towns in the range; the closest towns are Panjakent and Samarkand. A major road between Dushanbe and Khujand crosses the range; another road to Samarkand follows the Zarafshan River. The roads into secondary valleys, including the Yaghnob valley, are mostly unpaved and poorly maintained.

Most of the population of the range are Tajiks. The population of the Yaghnob Valley are the Yaghnobi.

== Tourism ==
The Fann Mountains, and, to a lesser extent, the Matcha Mountains are popular among mountaineers and hikers.

== See also ==
- List of mountains in Tajikistan
- List of mountains of Uzbekistan
