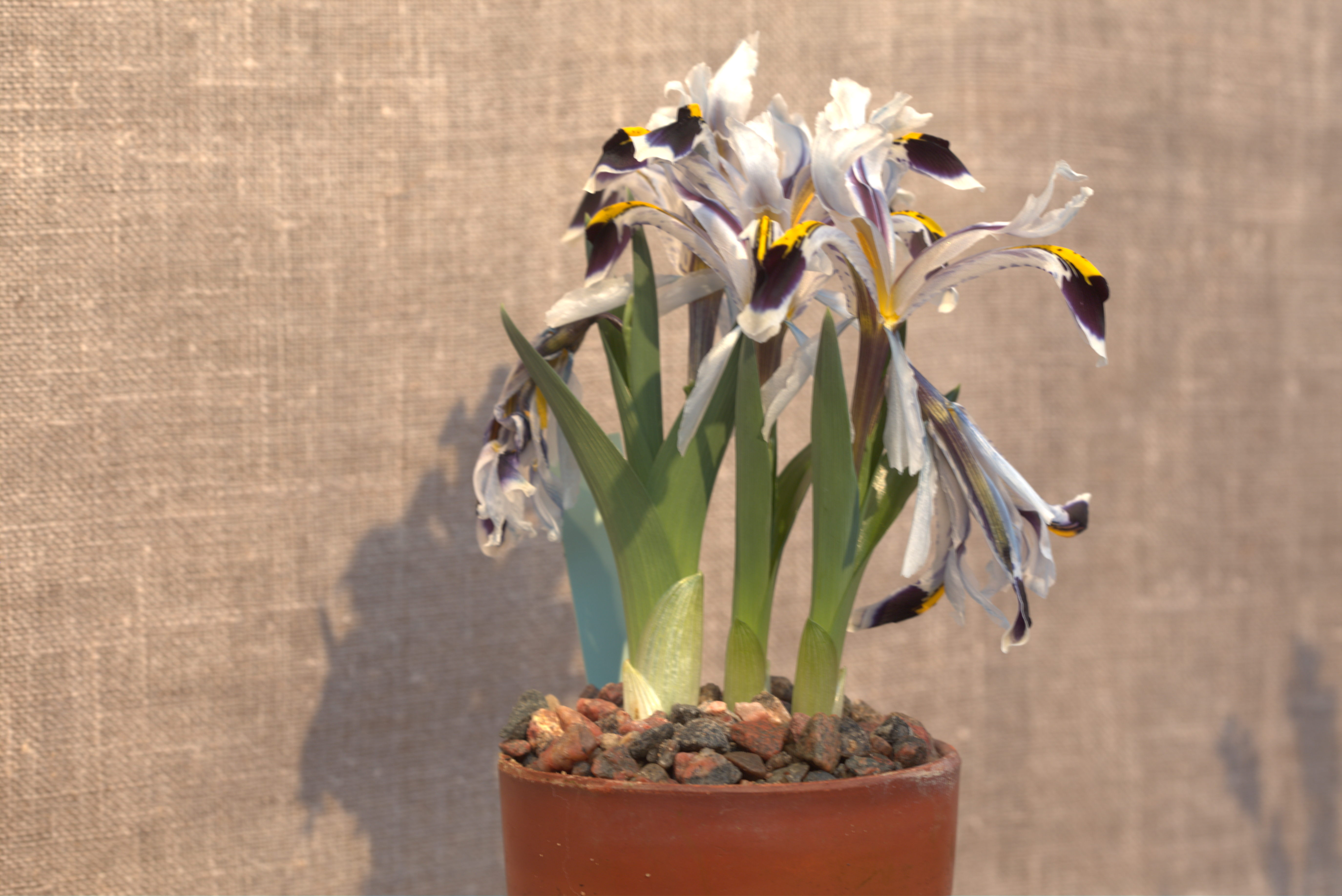
- At the Gothenburg Botanical Garden

Scientific classification
- Kingdom: Plantae
- Clade: Embryophytes
- Clade: Tracheophytes
- Clade: Spermatophytes
- Clade: Angiosperms
- Clade: Monocots
- Order: Asparagales
- Family: Iridaceae
- Genus: Iris
- Species: I. nicolai

Binomial name
- Iris nicolai (Vved.) Vved.

Synonyms
- Iris rosenbachiana var. coerulea Regel; Juno nicolai Vved.

= Iris nicolai =

Species of plant

Iris nicolai is a species of flowering plant in the family Iridaceae. It is native to Tajikistan and Uzbekistan. A tuberous geophyte reaching 15 cm (6 in), it is typically found on clay slopes at elevations from 1,000 to 2,000 m (3,300 to 6,600 ft). It is very similar to Iris rosenbachiana.
