= Dizhik =

- Location in Tajikistan
- Coordinates: 39°7′56″N 68°25′37″E
- Country: Tajikistan
- Region: Sughd Region
- District: Ayni District

Dizhik (Tajik: Диҷик) is a village in Sughd Region, northern Tajikistan. It is part of the jamoat Fondaryo in the Ayni District.
