= Kante, Tajikistan =

Kante
- Location in Tajikistan
- Coordinates: 39°14′21″N 68°29′55″E
- Country: Tajikistan
- Region: Sughd Region
- District: Ayni District

Kante (Tajik: Канте) is a village in Sughd Region, northern Tajikistan. It is part of the jamoat Fondaryo in the Ayni District. It is located near the M34 highway (Tajikistan).
