= Zarafshan Bridge =

Bridge in Uzbekistan

- Zarafshon suvayirgʻich koʻprigi (Uzbek)
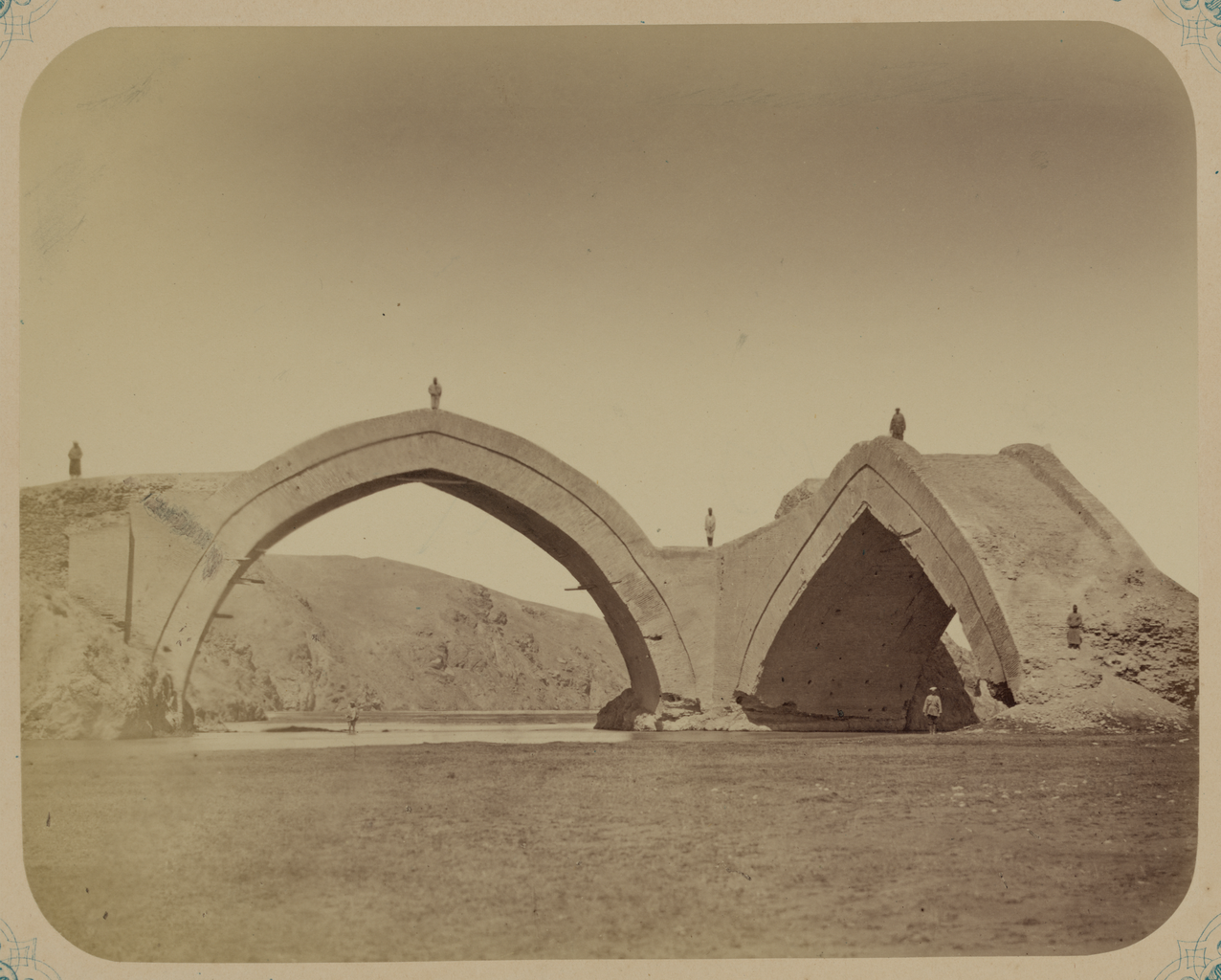
- Location: Samarkand, Zarafshon river, Uzbekistan
- Nearest city: Samarkand

History
- Built: Muhammad Shaybani
- Built for: Bridge
- Demolished: 1989

Zarafshan Bridge (Uzbek: Zarafshon suvayirgʻich koʻprigi, lit. 'Zarafshon water divider bridge') is an architectural monument located 7–8 km northeast of Samarkand on the left bank of the Zarafshan River (Samarkand Region, Uzbekistan). The bridge was built in the year 1502 by the order of Muhammad Shaybani. It served as a water divider on the Zarafshon, giving rise to two branches — Akdarya and Karadarya.

== History ==
Zarafshan Water Bridge is located 7–8 km northeast of Samarkand on the left bank of the Zarafshan River. Currently, it is situated slightly below the railway bridge in the form of a massive brick arch, which is one of the spans of this bridge. In historical sources, the bridge is mentioned under various names such as "Timur's Arch," "Puli Shadman Malik," and "Abdullah Khan's Bridge".

In the mid-15th century, the bridge across the Zarafshan was destroyed by a flood. The construction history of this monument is detailed in the work "Sheybani-name" by Kamal ad-Din Binai, a historian and poet who lived in the second half of the 15th to the early 16th century. According to the account, Muhammad Shaybani, while struggling to cross the river once again, ordered the construction of a new bridge. A dam was specially built to block the Zarafshan for this purpose. The bridge was 200 meters long and consisted of seven arches. It is also unknown when and under what circumstances the bridge began to deteriorate. The bridge is a complex structure. Samarkand craftsmen prepared a special mortar for it, similar to modern cement. Gypsum, lime, and plant ash were used in different places, depending on the degree of contact with water, to make the mortar.

== Research ==
Engineer Bogoslovsky, sent as part of the diplomatic mission of the Russian Empire to Bukhara in 1841, wrote in his diary that he saw this bridge already in ruins, with only three arches remaining. Most likely, two arches were destroyed during the earthquakes of 1886 and 1898.

In 1962, as a result of archaeological excavations conducted by Abdulakhad Muhammadjanov, the remains of the collapsed second and third arches of the bridge were discovered and studied. It was also determined that the construction was made of rectangular bricks with a width of 26 or 27 cm and a thickness of 5 cm. The width of the surviving arch is 21 meters and 60 centimeters. The structure consists of two layers, with the thickness of the lower part being 165 cm and the upper part 125 cm. To reinforce the support and prevent its collapse, an additional support was installed on the right side of the arch.

Railings, one meter in height and width, made of fired brick, were constructed on both sides of the bridge. This type of construction indicates that the engineers of the 16th century, who designed this structure, took into account safety measures for those crossing the river.

== Importance ==
Zarafshan Bridge played a crucial role for Samarkand. Caravan routes from the city passed through the bridge on the way to the Tashkent oasis, areas along the Syr Darya River, the Fergana Valley, and Bukhara. Additionally, this structure served as a water divider for the Zarafshan River, giving rise to the Akdarya and Karadarya branches. Another significant aspect of this construction is its role in regulating the water flow in the Zarafshan River. The bridge also contributed to the even irrigation of lands near Samarkand. The sole surviving arch of the bridge holds great importance for studying the history of hydraulic structures in Uzbekistan.
