= Battle of Samarkand (1598) =

Battle between the Kazakh Khanate and the Khanate of Bukhara

- Part of Kazakh-Bukhara War (1598)
| Date | 1598 |
| Location | Between Tashkent and Samarkand, Uzbekistan |
| Result | Kazakh victory |

Belligerents
| Kazakh Khanate | Khanate of Bukhara |

Commanders and leaders
| (Kazakh Khanate) Tauekel Khan | (Khanate of Bukhara) Unknown |

The Battle of Samarkand was fought in 1598 between the Kazakh and Bukhara Khanates, on the territory near Samarkand, in which the Kazakhs were victorious. The struggle of Khan Taukel for the inclusion of Tashkent and Turkistan in the Kazakh Khanate and the unification of the Kazakh ethnic lands did not cease. In early 1598 in the state of the Shaybanids, a struggle for the throne erupted between Abdullah-khan and his son Abd al-Mumin. Deciding to take advantage of this, Khan Taukel organized a campaign against the Shaybanid state. Incorrectly assessing the power of the Kazakh Khanate, Abdullah Khan II underestimated the Kazakh troops and sent only border troops. A fierce battle broke out on the road between Tashkent and Samarkand. The troops of the Bukhara khan suffered a crushing defeat: «most of the emirs and commanders, as well as several sultans, perished; those warriors who survived fled to Bukhara in the most miserable and wretched state». Skillfully leading his army, Taukel defeated the Uzbek army between Samarkand and Tashkent, but he failed to consolidate these territories. Abdullah-khan, deciding to completely eliminate the threat to his state from the north, personally led a campaign against the Kazakhs, but died on route. Soon after, his son Abd Al-Mumin-khan was killed, after which the Shaybanid state began to disintegrate into small holdings. Having received news of this in the summer of 1598, as indicated in the "Tarikh-i Alam-ara-yi Abbasi," Khan Taukel undertook a major campaign in Central Asia.
