= Turkestan Range =

Mountain range mostly in western Tajikistan

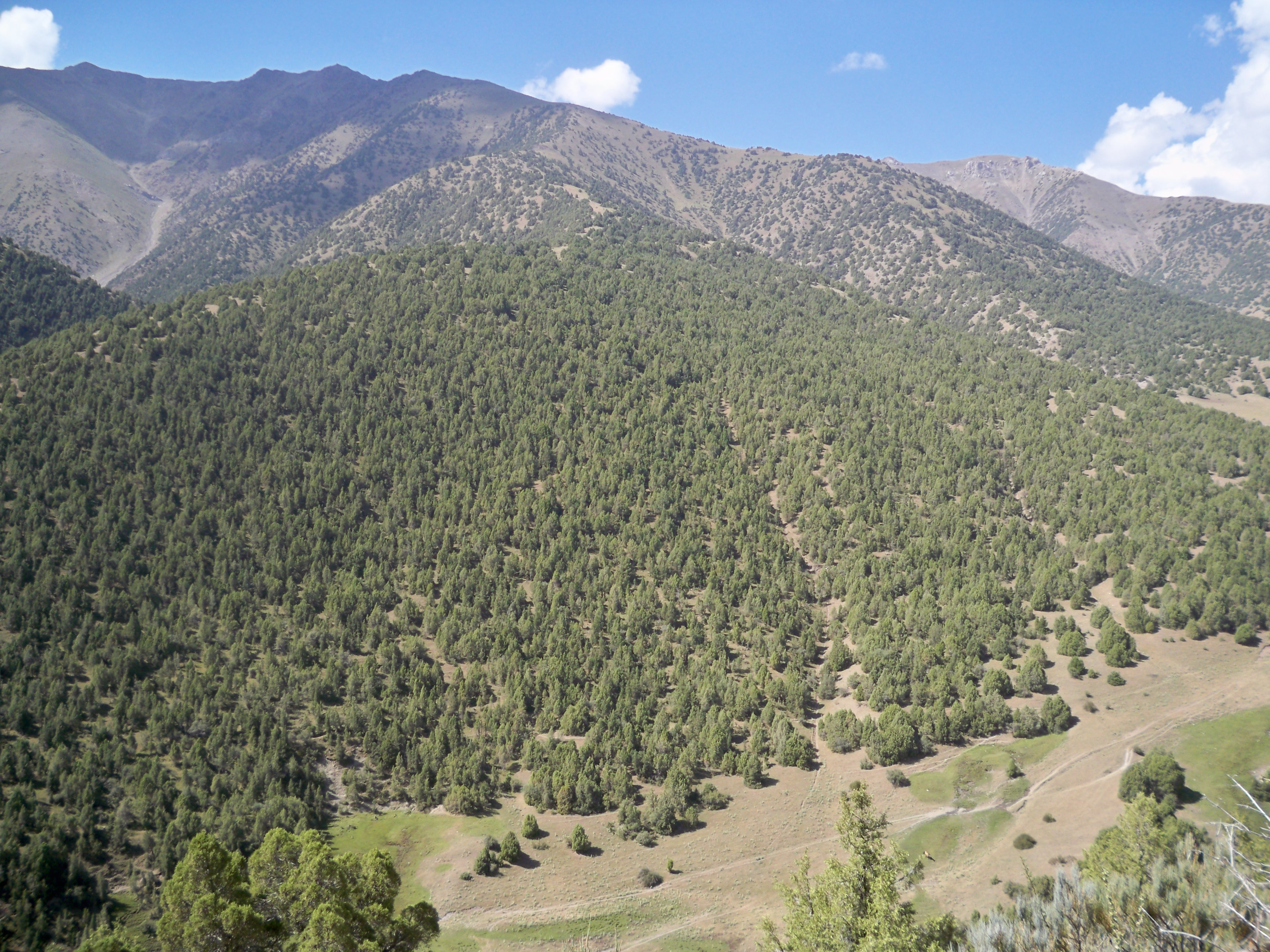
- Turkestan chain south of Isfana.

Highest point
- Peak: Pik Skalisty
- Elevation: 5,621 m (18,442 ft)

Dimensions
- Length: 340 km (210 mi) E-W

Geography
- Location within Tajikistan
- Countries: Kyrgyzstan, Tajikistan and Uzbekistan
- Region: Batken Province
- Range coordinates: 39°35′N 69°45′E

Geology
- Rock type(s): Composed of sandstones, limestones, and siltstones of Paleozoic and Mesozoic age

One of the northern extensions of the Pamir-Alay system, the Turkestan Range (Russian: Туркестанский хребет; Kyrgyz: Түркстан кырка тоосу; Uzbek: Туркистон тизмаси, romanized: Turkiston tizmasi; Tajik: Қаторкӯҳи Туркистон) stretches for a total length of 340 km from the Alay Mountains on the border of Kyrgyzstan with Tajikistan to the Samarkand oasis in Uzbekistan. It runs in the east–west direction, north of the Zeravshan Range, forming the southern boundary of the Ferghana Valley in Tajikistan and Golodnaya Steppe in Uzbekistan. The highest elevations are in the east, near the border with Kyrgyzstan. The maximum elevation is the Pik Skalisty at 5,621 metres (18,442 ft). Glaciation occurs especially in the east. The southern slopes are bare cliffs and mountain steppe; the northern slopes are covered with forests. A highway through the Shakhristan Pass at 3,378 meters (11,083 ft) connects the capital Dushanbe with Khujand in Northern Tajikistan (Sughd Province).

== See also ==
- Geography of Tajikistan
