= Seven Lakes (Tajikistan) =

Lakes in Tajikistan

- Mizhgon, the first of the Seven Lakes
- Interactive map of Seven Lakes
- Location: Panjakent, Sughd Region, Tajikistan
- Coordinates: 39°08′33″N 67°51′18″E
- Primary inflows: Shing
- Surface elevation: 1,700–2,400 m (5,600–7,900 ft)

The Seven Lakes (Tajik: Ҳафткӯл, Haftkɵl, meaning "seven lakes"), also known as the Marguzor Lakes (Tajik: Марғузор, Marghuzor), are a group of seven mountain lakes located in the Fan Mountains of western Tajikistan. They are occasionally referred to as the Seven Beauties of Shing, after the Shing River, which flows through the valley where the lakes are situated. These natural dammed lakes mark the western boundary of the Pamir-Alay mountain system.

== The lakes ==
The Seven Lakes are situated in the Panjakent District of the Sughd Region, Tajikistan. They lie at elevations ranging from approximately 1,598 metres above sea level for the first lake to around 2,400 metres for the seventh. The lakes are known for their distinctive and varied colours, which are caused by mineral content and differing light conditions.

Each lake has an individual name but may also be identified numerically, from the first to the seventh, based on their order along the valley. Below is a description of each lake:

- 1) Mižgon or Nežegon (Tajik: Мижгон; Russian: Нежегон) - Located at an elevation of 1,598 m, the name means "eyelashes". The lake is noted for its turquoise, blue, and sometimes purple hues. It covers an area of 0.05 km² and reaches a maximum depth of 20 m.
- 2) Soja (Tajik: Соя) - At 1,701 m elevation, the name translates to "shadow" in Tajik, referring to the limited sunlight reaching the lake due to its position in a narrow valley. Its waters appear in various shades of blue and purple.
- 3) Ҳušër, Gušor, or Izšor (Tajik: Ҳушёр, Russian: Гушор/Изшор) - Located at 1,770 m, the name is interpreted as "vigilance," reportedly due to the presence of venomous snakes in the surrounding area.
- 4) Nofin (Tajik: Нофин) - At 1,820 m, this lake is approximately 2 km long and 400 m wide. Its waters often take on reddish hues.
- 5) Churdak (Tajik: Хурдак) - Situated at 1,870 m, the name means "small," and it is the smallest of the seven lakes. It lies near the village of Padrut.
- 6) Marǧuzor or Marguzor (Tajik: Марғузор/Маргузор) - At 2,139 m elevation, Marguzor is the largest and most well-known of the lakes. Its waters are light blue, and it is considered among the most scenic in the group.
- 7) Hazārčašma or Azorčašma (Tajik: Ҳазорчашма or Азорчашма) - The highest of the lakes at 2,400 m, Hazorchashma is somewhat separate from the rest of the group and is fed by numerous springs, streams, and two rivers (the Gissar and the Darachti Surch). The name means "a thousand springs."

== Gallery ==
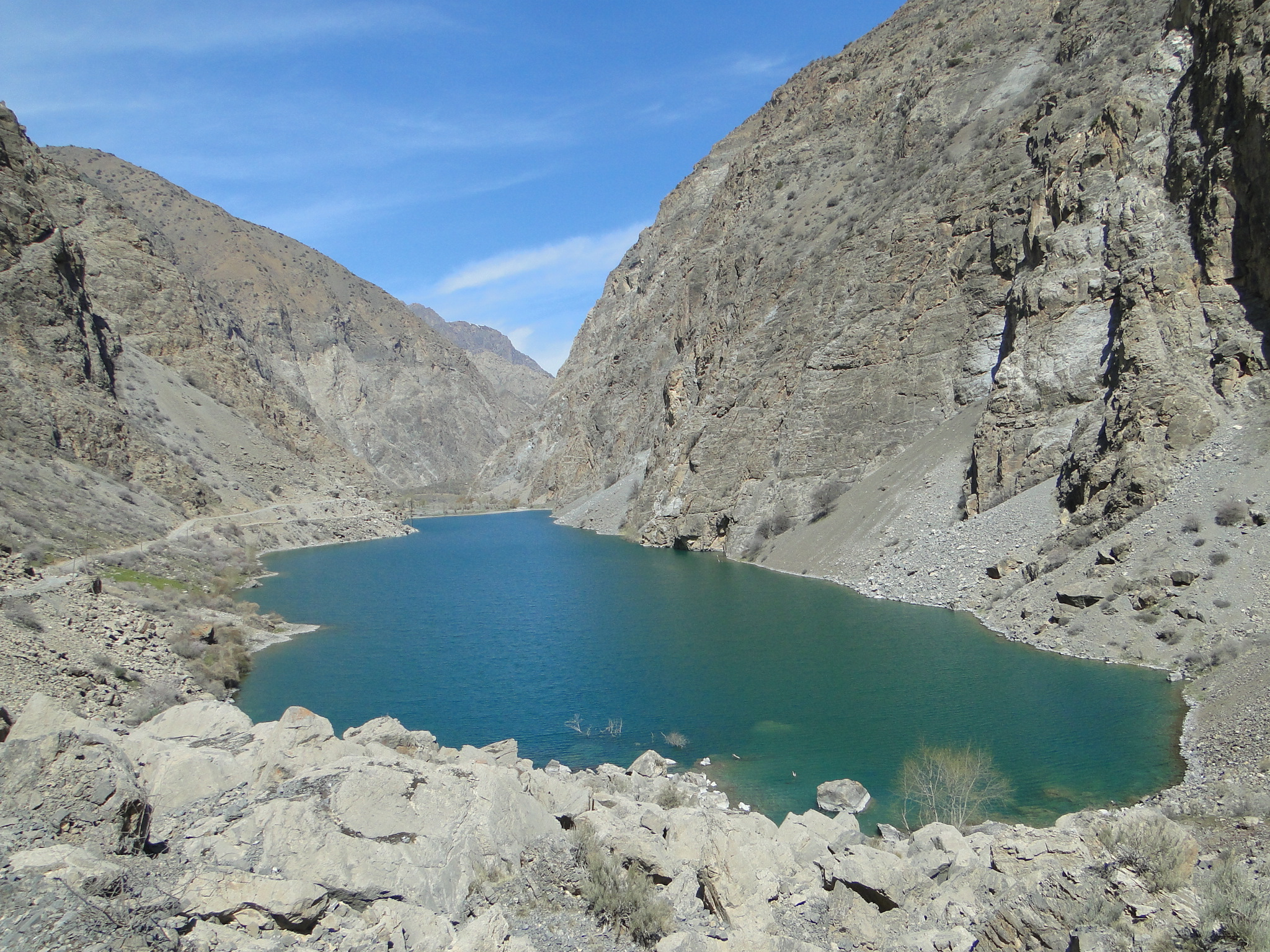
View of the lake no. 3

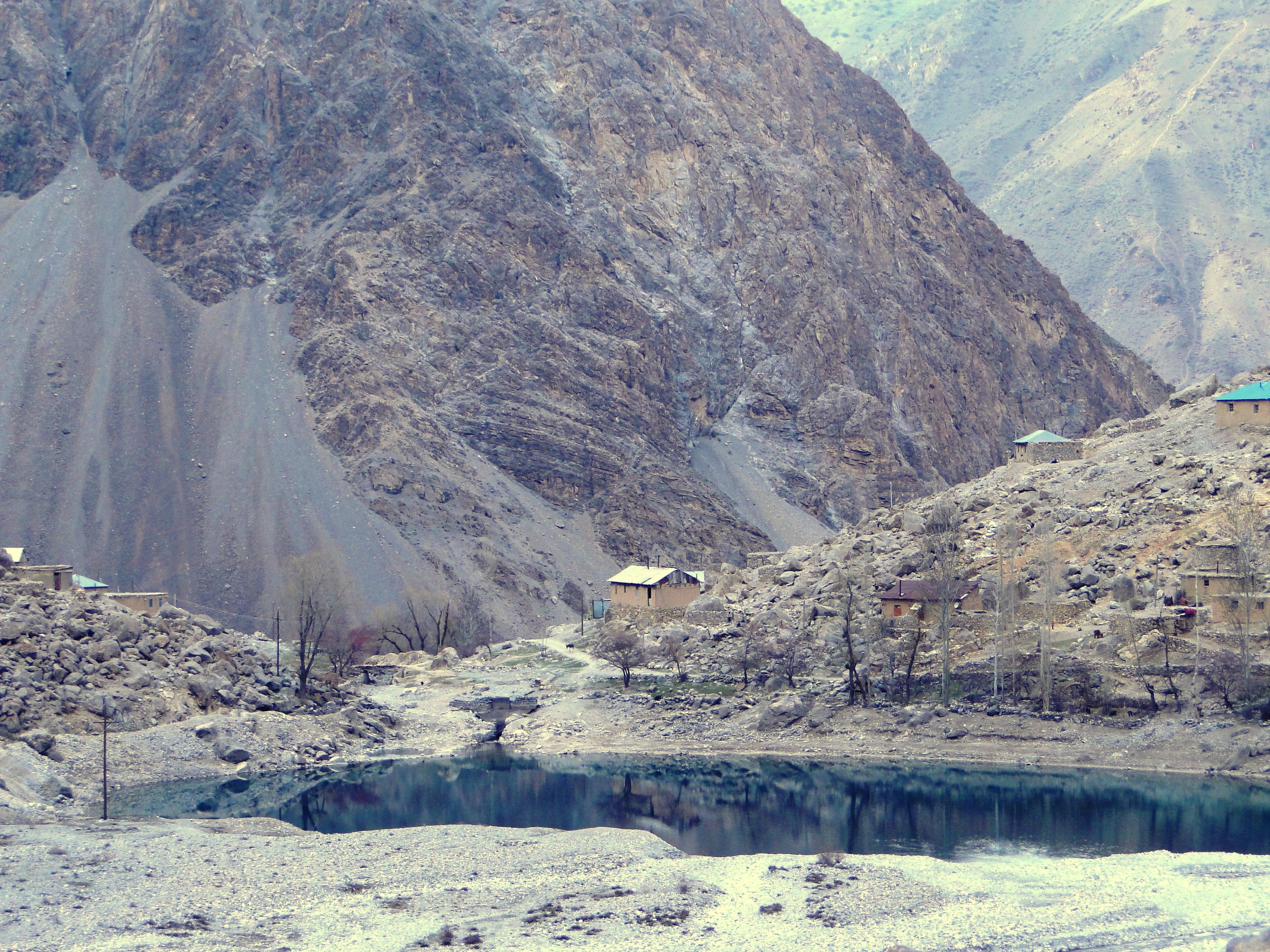
Partial view of lake no. 5

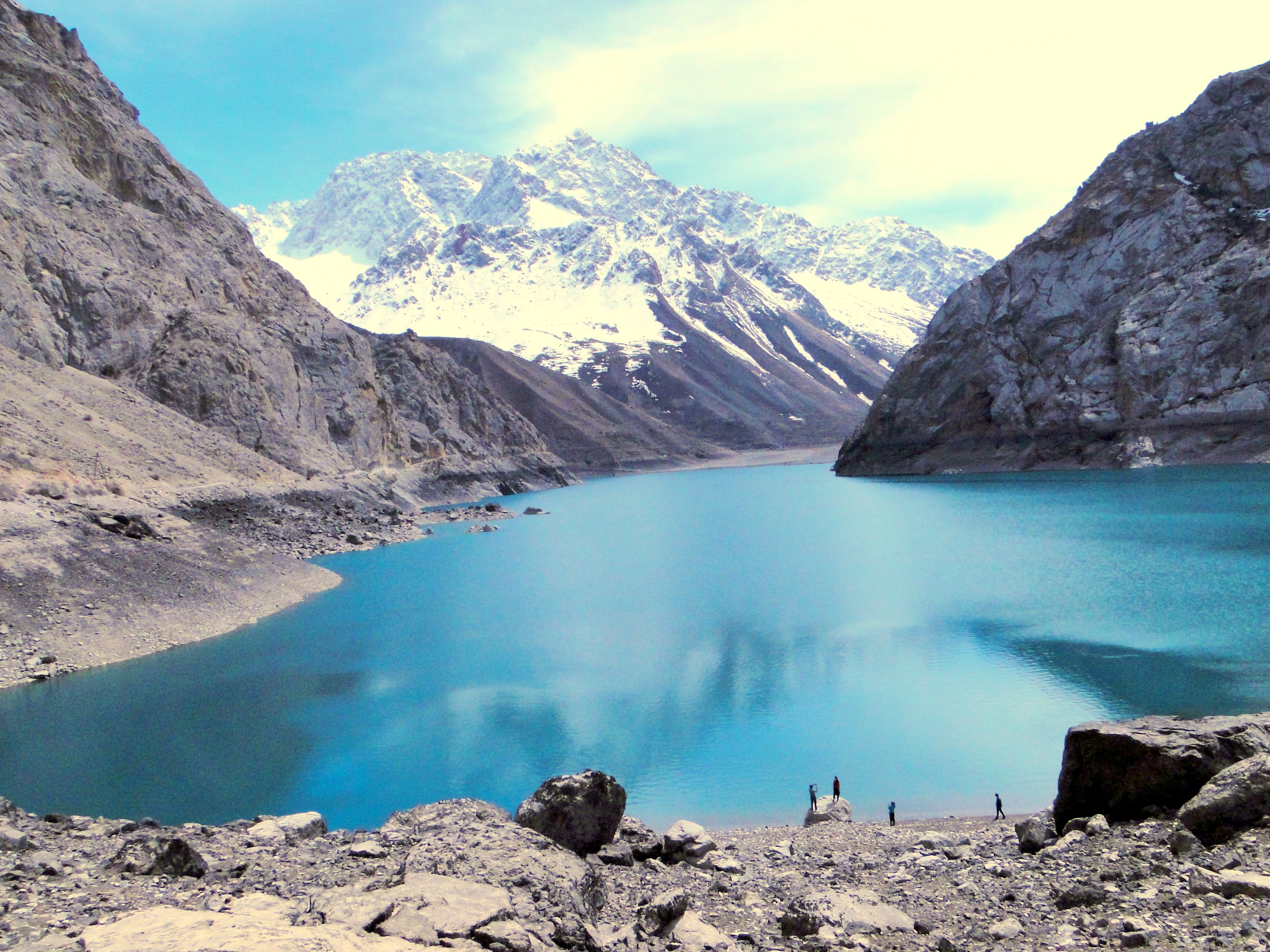
View of the lake no. 6

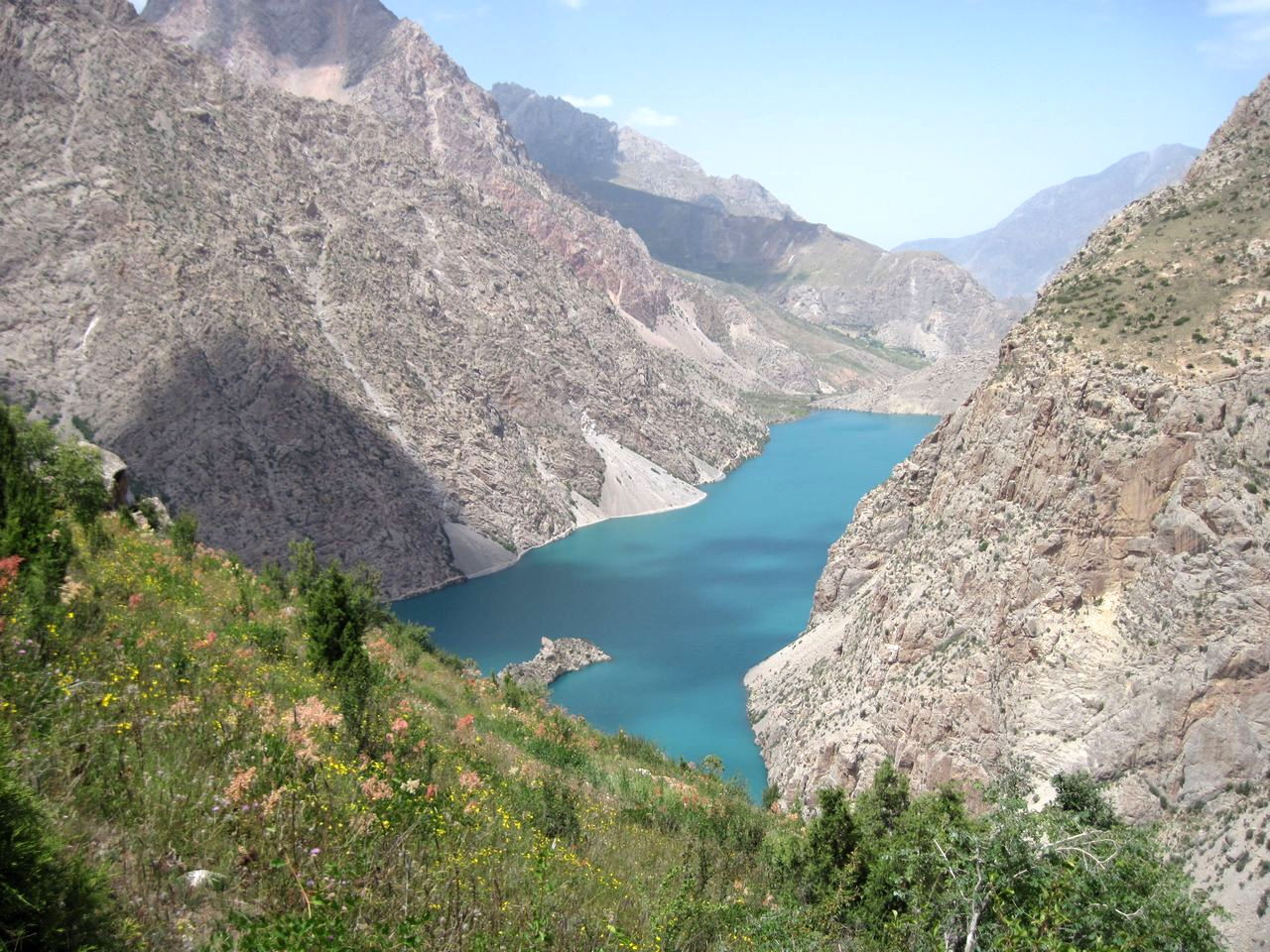
View of the lake no. 7
