= Pamir-Alay =

Mountain system in Central Asia

- Помиру-Олой (Tajik); Помир-Алай (Shughni); Pomir-Oloy (Uzbek); Памир-Алай (Kyrgyz); Памиро-Алай (Russian)
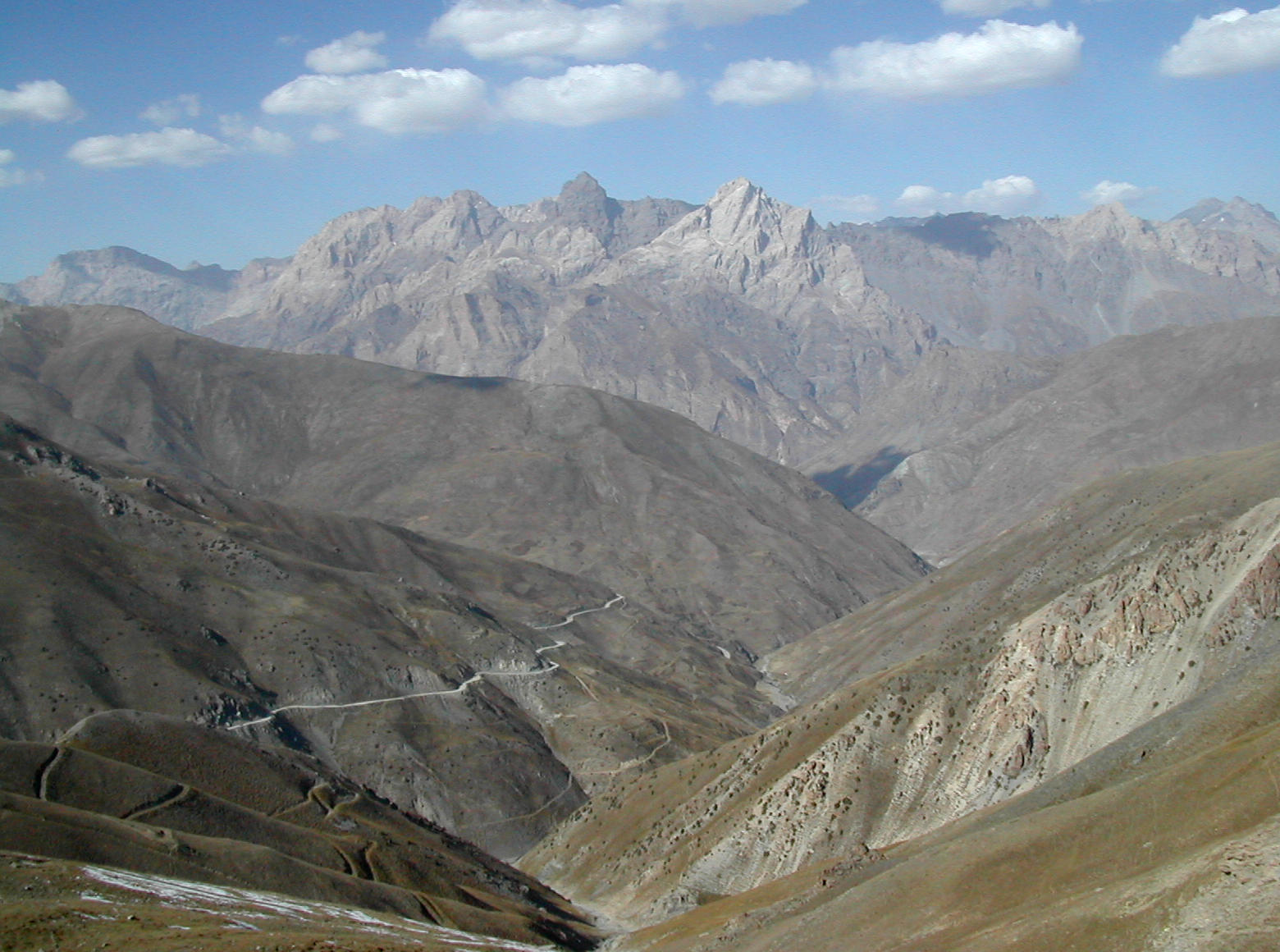
- View of the Zarafshan Range near the Anzob Pass

Highest point
- Peak: Pik Skalisty
- Elevation: 5,621 m (18,442 ft)
- Coordinates: 39°30′N 71°0′E

Dimensions
- Length: 900 km (560 mi) E/W
- Width: 150 km (93 mi) N/S

Geography
- Location within Tajikistan
- Country: Tajikistan
- Parent range: Pamir Mountains

The Pamir-Alay is a mountain system in Tajikistan, Kyrgyzstan and Uzbekistan, located north of the main range of the Pamir Mountains. It encompasses four main mountain ranges extending west from the Tian Shan Mountains. They are variously considered part of the Tian Shan, of the Pamir, or a separate mountain system. The term "Pamiro-Alay" is also used to refer to the mountain region encompassing the Pamir, the Pamir-Alay proper (then referred to as "Gissaro-Alay") and the Tajik Depression.

The Pamir-Alay stretches between the valleys of the Syr Darya (Fergana Valley) to its north and the Vakhsh to its south. Its highest summit is Pik Skalisty (Russian: пик Скалистый; lit. 'rocky peak'), with an elevation of 5,621 m (18,442 ft), in the Turkestan Range. The Pamir-Alay is about 900 km long (559 mi) in west–east direction, and up to 150 km (93 mi) wide in the Western part.

== Main subranges ==
The Pamir-Alay is subdivided into the following mountain ranges:

- Turkestan Range (5,621 m) or (18,442 ft)
- Alay Range (5,544 m) or (18,188 ft)
- Zarafshan Range (5,489 m) or (18,008 ft), including Fann Mountains
- Gissar Range (4,643 m) or (15,232 ft), including Köýtendag Range
