= Qorakoʻl =

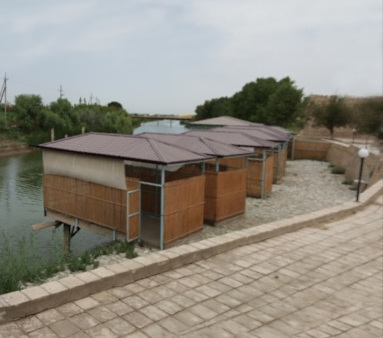
- Beach huts

- Location in Uzbekistan
- Coordinates: 39°30′10″N 63°51′20″E
- Country: Uzbekistan
- Region: Bukhara Region
- District: Qorakoʻl District

Population (2016)
  - Total: 22,300
- Time zone: UTC+5 (UZT)

Qorakoʻl, (Note: Uzbek: Қоракўл, romanized: Qorakoʻl, arabized: قره کۉل, pronounced [ˌqɒrɐˈkɵl]) also spelled as Karakul, (Note: Russian: Каракуль, romanized: Karakulj, pronounced [kərɐˈkulʲ]) is a city in the Bukhara Region of Uzbekistan. It is the capital of Qorakoʻl District (Qorakoʻl tumani). Its population is 22,300 (2016).

== Name ==
"Qorakoʻl" means "black lake" (< qora 'black' + ko'l 'lake') in Uzbek language. The Turkic name of Lake Karakul in this area has been known since the beginning of the 8th century.

== History ==
The status of the city was granted in 1980. Previously it had been an urban-type settlement.
