= Hisar Range =

Mountain range in Uzbekistan and Tajikistan

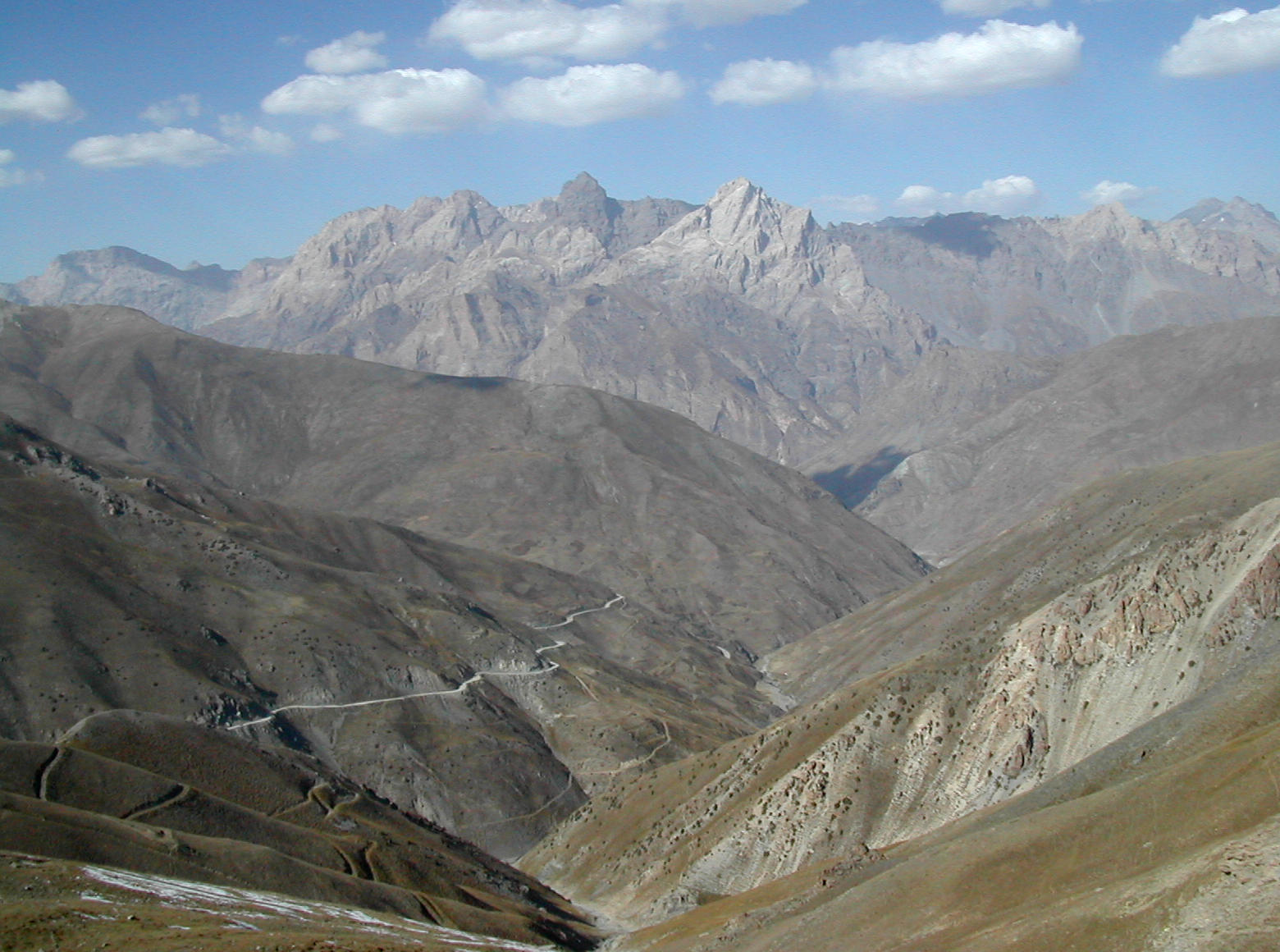
- View of the Anzob Pass across the Hisar Range with the Zarafshan Range in the background

Highest point
- Peak: Alpomish Peak
- Elevation: 4,668 m (15,315 ft)
- Coordinates: 38°55′N 68°15′E

Naming
- Native name: Қаторкӯҳи Ҳисор (Tajik); Hisor timasi (Uzbek); Гиссарский хребет (Russian)

Geography
- Location within Tajikistan
- Countries: Tajikistan, Uzbekistan
- Parent range: Pamir Mountains

The Hisar Range, (Note: Tajik: Қаторкӯҳи Ҳисор, romanized: Qatorko‘hi Hisor, IPA: [qɐtʰɔɾˈkʰɵhɪ hɪˈsɔɾ]; Uzbek: Ҳисор тизмаси, romanized: Hisor tizmasi, IPA: [hɪ̆ˈsɒɾ tʰɪzmæˈsɪ̆]) formerly the Gissar Range, (Note: Russian: Гиссарский хребет, romanized: Gissarskij hrebet, IPA: [gʲɪsˈsarskʲɪj xrʲɪˈbʲet]) is a mountain range in Central Asia, in the western part of the Pamir-Alay system, stretching over 200 km in the general east–west direction across the territory of Tajikistan and Uzbekistan.

== Geography ==
The Hisar Range lies south of the Zarafshon Range, extending north of Dushanbe through Tajikistan's Hissar District of the Districts of Republican Subordination and reaching Uzbekistan at the north tip of Surxondaryo Region.

The highest point in the Hisar Range is Alpomish Peak and is also the highest point in Uzbekistan, according to a 2023 survey which determined an elevation of 4,668 meters (15,315 ft). The mountain is located on the Uzbekistan-Tajikistan border, just north-west of Dushanbe. As of December 2025, Uzbek officials still listed the highest point of the country as Khazret Sultan, which is also located within the Hisar Range.

The Hissar Range is composed of crystalline rocks, schist, and sandstone, punctured by granite intrusions.

=== Nature ===
Shirkent National Park is located in Hisar range.

== See also ==
- List of mountains in Tajikistan
