= Geography of Tajikistan =

Coordinates: 39°00′N 71°00′E

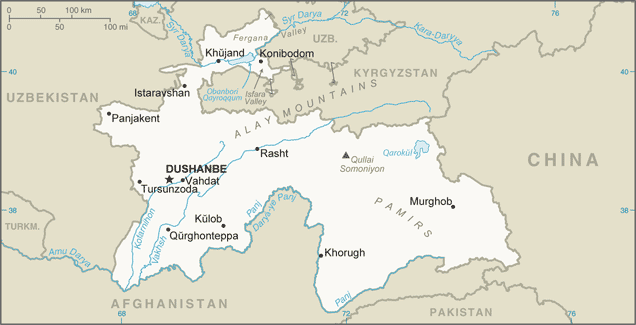
- Continent: Asia
- Region: Central Asia
- Area
  - Total: 142,326 km^{2} (54,952 sq mi)
- Coastline: 0 km (0 mi)
- Highest point: Ismoil Somoni Peak; 7,495 m
- Lowest point: Khujand; 300 m
- Longest river: Panj
- Largest lake: Karakul
- Climate: Cold Semi-arid climate Tundra climate

Tajikistan is nestled between Kyrgyzstan and Uzbekistan to the north and west, China to the east, and Afghanistan to the south. Mountains cover 93 percent of Tajikistan's surface area. The two principal ranges, the Pamir Mountains and the Alay Mountains, give rise to many glacier-fed streams and rivers, which have been used to irrigate farmlands since ancient times. Central Asia's other major mountain range, the Tian Shan, skirts northern Tajikistan. Mountainous terrain separates Tajikistan's two population centers, which are in the lowlands of the southern (Panj River) and northern (Fergana Valley) sections of the country. Especially in areas of intensive agricultural and industrial activity, the Soviet Union's natural resource utilization policies left independent Tajikistan with a legacy of environmental problems.

== Dimensions and borders ==
With an area of 142,600 km^{2} (55,100 sq mi), Tajikistan has a maximum east-to-west extent of 700 km (430 mi), and a maximum north-to-south extent of 350 km (220 mi). The country's highly irregular border is 3,651 km (2,269 mi) long, including 414 km (257 mi) along the Chinese border to the east and 1,206 km (749 mi) along the frontier with Afghanistan to the south. Most of the southern border with Afghanistan is defined by the Amu Darya (darya is the Persian word for river) and its tributary the Panj River (Darya-ye Panj), which has headwaters in Afghanistan and Tajikistan. The other neighbors are the former Soviet republics of Uzbekistan (to the west and the north) and Kyrgyzstan (to the north).

== Topography and drainage ==
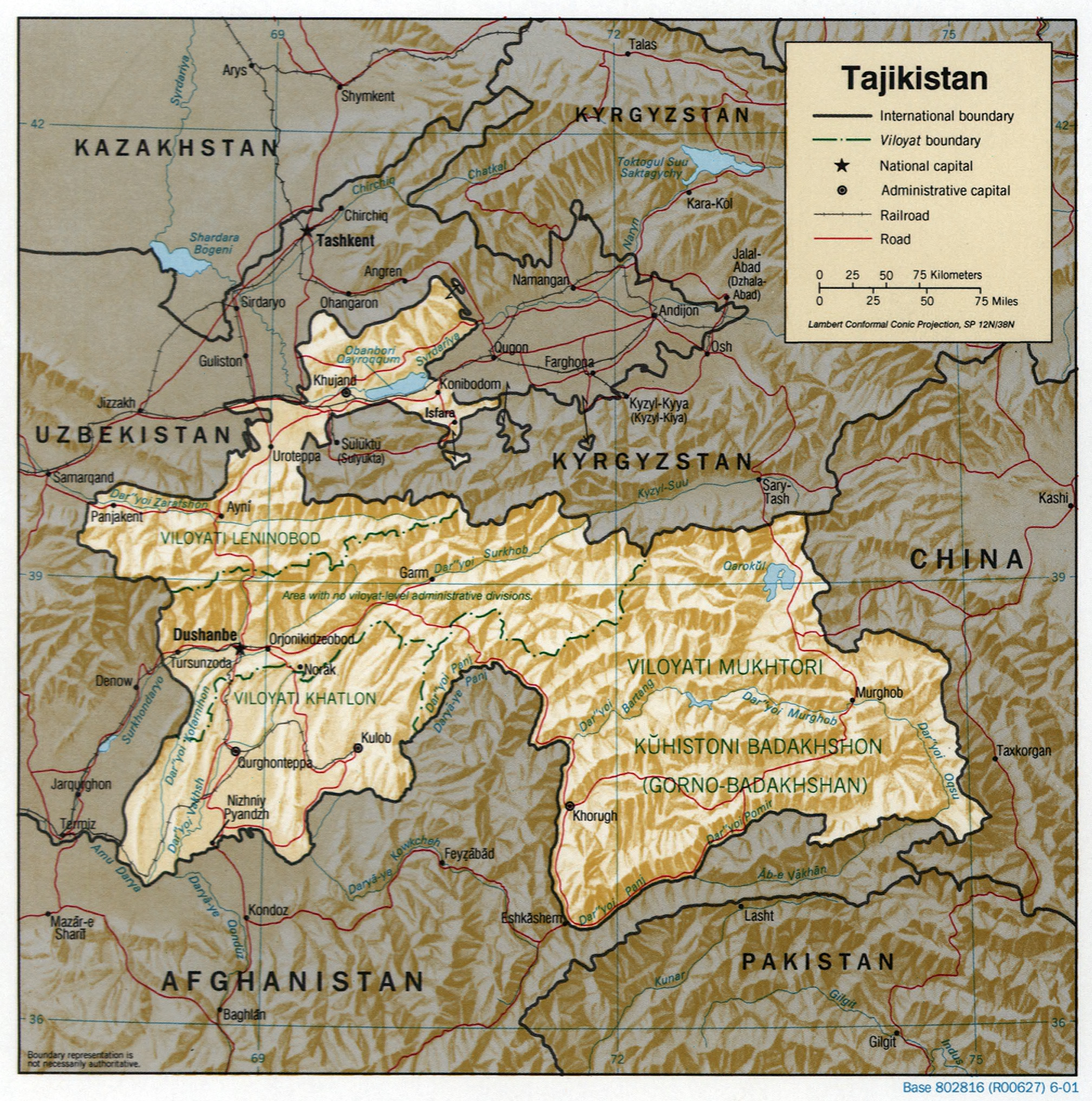
Detailed map of Tajikistan

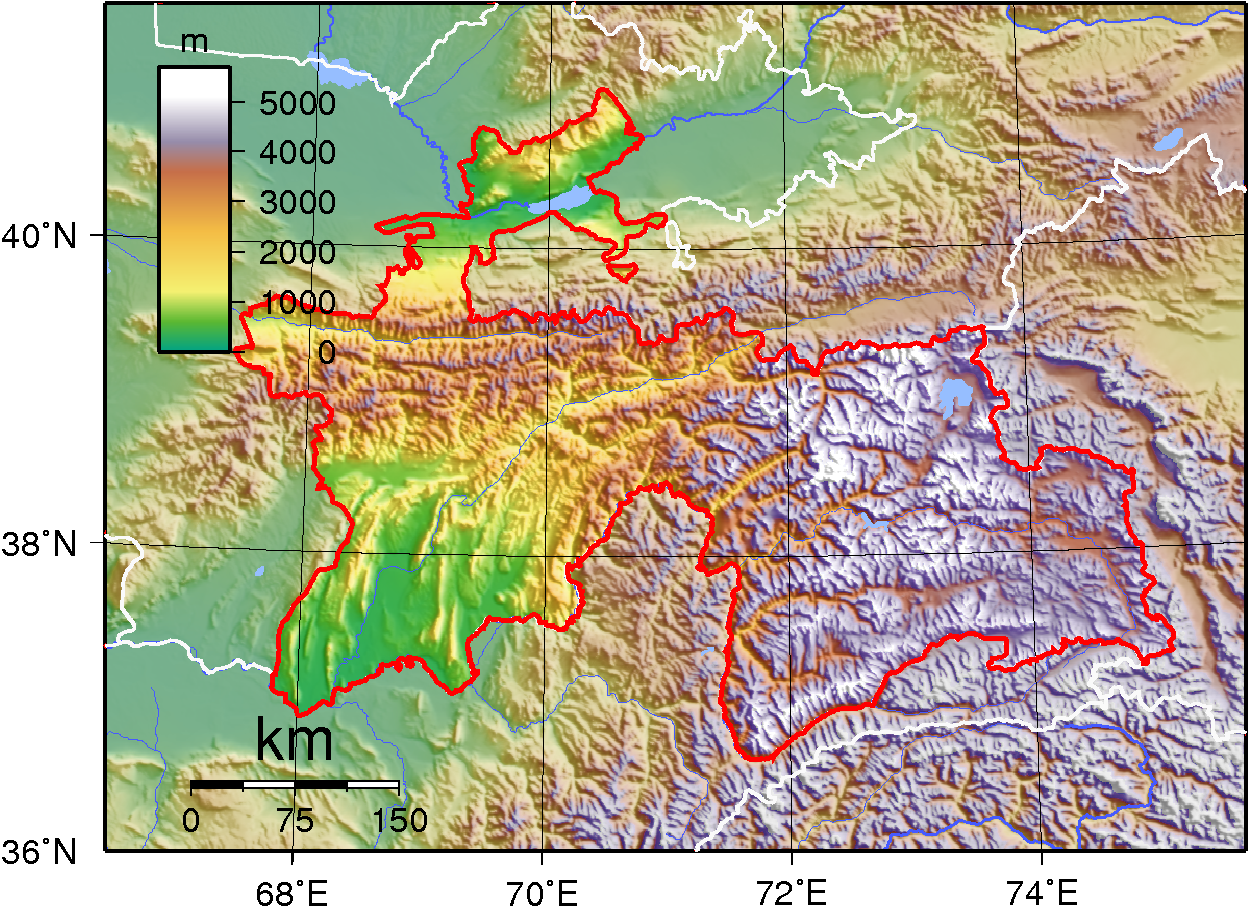
Topography of Tajikistan

The lower elevations of Tajikistan are divided into northern and southern regions by a complex of three mountain chains that constitute the westernmost extension of the massive Tian Shan system. Running essentially parallel from east to west, the chains are the Turkestan, Zeravshan (Zarafshan), and Hisor (Gissar) mountains. The last of these lies just north of the capital, Dushanbe, which is situated in west-central Tajikistan.

More than half of Tajikistan lies above an elevation of 3,000 metres (9,800 ft). Even the lowlands, which are located in the Fergana Valley in the far north and in Khatlon Province in the southwest, are well above sea level. In the Turkestan range, highest of the western chains, the maximum elevation is 5,510 metres (18,080 ft). The highest elevations of this range are in the east, near the border with Kyrgyzstan. That region is dominated by the peaks of the Pamir-Alay mountain system, including two of the three highest elevations in the former Soviet Union: Mount Lenin — 7,134 metres (23,406 ft) and Ismoil Somoni Peak — 7,495 metres (24,590 ft). Several other peaks in the region also exceed 7,000 metres (23,000 ft). The mountains contain numerous glaciers, the largest of which, Vanch-Yakh Glacier, covers more than 700 square kilometres (270 sq mi) and is the largest glacier in the world outside the polar regions. Because Tajikistan lies in an active seismic belt, severe earthquakes are common.

=== Fergana Valley ===
The Fergana Valley, the most densely populated region in Central Asia irrigated by the Syr Darya in its upper course, spreads across the north-eastern arm of Uzbekistan and Northern Tajikistan. This long valley, which lies between two mountain ranges — the Kuramin Range in the north and the Turkestan Range in the south, reaches its lowest elevation of 320 metres (1,050 ft) at Khujand on the Syr Darya. Rivers bring rich soil deposits into the Fergana Valley from the surrounding mountains, creating a series of fertile oases that have long been prized for agriculture.

=== Drainage ===
In Tajikistan's dense river network, the largest rivers are the Syr Darya and the Amu Darya; the largest tributaries are the Vakhsh and the Kofarnihon, which form valleys from northeast to southwest across western Tajikistan. The Amu Darya carries more water than any other river in Central Asia. The upper course of the Amu Darya, called the Panj River, is 921 kilometres (572 mi) long. The river's name changes at the confluence of the Panj, the Vakhsh, and the Kofarnihon rivers in far southwestern Tajikistan. The Vakhsh, called the Kyzyl-Suu ("red water" in Turkic languages) upstream in Kyrgyzstan and the Surkhob in its middle course in north-central Tajikistan, is the second largest river in southern Tajikistan after the Amu-Panj system. In the Soviet era, the Vakhsh was dammed at several points for irrigation and electric power generation, most notably at Norak (Nurek), east of Dushanbe, where one of the world's highest dams forms the Nurek Reservoir. Numerous factories also were built along the Vakhsh to draw upon its waters and potential for electric power generation. Due to the uneven distribution of water throughout Central Asia, the Soviets created a system in which Kyrgyzstan and Tajikistan provided water to Kazakhstan, Turkmenistan, and Uzbekistan in summer, and these three countries provided oil and gas to Kyrgyzstan and Tajikistan during winter. After the collapse of the USSR in 1991, this system fell apart and a new resource-sharing plan has yet to be put in place. According to research conducted by the International Crisis Group, this is due to corruption and lack of political will; failure to solve this issue could lead to irreversible regional destabilization.

The two most important rivers in northern Tajikistan are the Syr Darya and the Zeravshan (Zarafshan). The former, the second longest river in Central Asia with a total length of 2,400 kilometres (1,500 mi), stretches 195 kilometres (121 mi) across the Fergana Valley in far-northern Tajikistan. The Zeravshan River, with a total length of 781 kilometres (485 mi), runs for 316 kilometres (196 mi) through the north-center of Tajikistan. Tajikistan's rivers reach high-water levels twice a year: in the spring, fed by the rainy season and melting mountain snow, and in the summer, fed by melting glaciers. The summer freshets are the more useful for irrigation, especially in the Fergana Valley and the valleys of southeastern Tajikistan. Most of Tajikistan's lakes are of glacial origin and are located in the Pamir region in the eastern half of the country. The largest, the Karakul (Qarokul) Lake, is a salt lake devoid of life, lying at an elevation of 4,200 metres (13,800 ft). Tajikistan's second largest water body is the Kayrakkum Reservoir, a 44 km (27 mi) long artificial lake in the heart of the Fergana Valley, not far from the city of Khujand in Sughd Province. The lake is fed by the Syr Darya. Another well-known natural lake of glacial origin is Iskanderkul. It is smaller than the Kayrakum Reservoir and lies in the Fann Mountains in western Tajikistan.

== Climate ==
Tajikistan map of Köppen climate classification

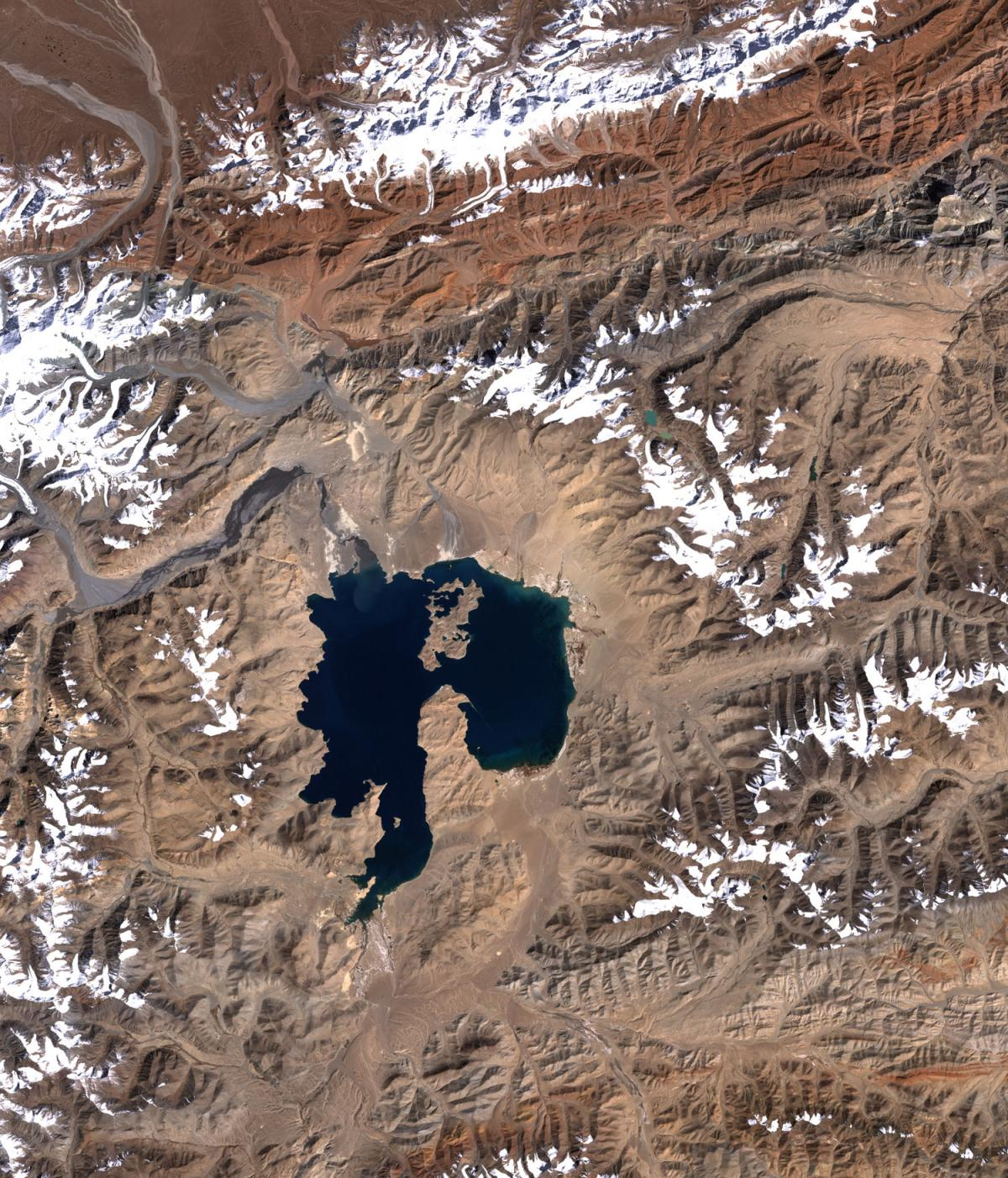
Karakul is a lake formed inside a meteor crater in Tajikistan.

Tajikistan's climate is continental, subtropical, and semiarid, with some desert areas. The climate changes drastically according to elevation, however. The Fergana Valley and other lowlands are shielded by mountains from Arctic air masses, but temperatures in that region still drop below freezing for more than 100 days a year. In the subtropical southwestern lowlands, which have the highest average temperatures, the climate is arid, although some sections now are irrigated for farming. At Tajikistan's lower elevations, the average temperature range is 23 to 30 °C (73.4 to 86.0 °F) in July and −1 to 3 °C (30.2 to 37.4 °F) in January. In the eastern Pamirs, the average July temperature is 5 to 10 °C (41 to 50 °F), and the average January temperature is −15 to −20 °C (5 to −4 °F).

Tajikistan is the wettest of the Central Asian republics, with the average annual precipitation for the Kafernigan and Vakhsh valleys in the south being around 500 to 600 mm (19.7 to 23.6 in), and up to 1,500 mm (59.1 in) in the mountains. At the Fedchenko Glacier, as much as 223.6 cm (88.0 in) of snow falls each year. Only in the northern Fergana Valley and in the rain shadow areas of the eastern Pamirs is precipitation as low as in other parts of Central Asia: in the eastern Pamirs less than 100 mm (3.94 in) falls per year. Most precipitation occurs in the winter and spring.

Climate data for Dushanbe (1991–2020, extremes 1926–present)
Month	Jan	Feb	Mar	Apr	May	Jun	Jul	Aug	Sep	Oct	Nov	Dec	Year
Record high °C (°F)	21.8 (71.2)	27.7 (81.9)	32.2 (90.0)	35.3 (95.5)	38.8 (101.8)	43.0 (109.4)	43.7 (110.7)	45.0 (113.0)	38.9 (102.0)	36.8 (98.2)	31.9 (89.4)	24.3 (75.7)	45.0 (113.0)
Mean daily maximum °C (°F)	9.0 (48.2)	11.0 (51.8)	17.0 (62.6)	22.8 (73.0)	27.9 (82.2)	33.6 (92.5)	36.4 (97.5)	35.5 (95.9)	31.3 (88.3)	24.4 (75.9)	16.7 (62.1)	11.1 (52.0)	23.1 (73.6)
Daily mean °C (°F)	3.1 (37.6)	5.0 (41.0)	10.5 (50.9)	15.8 (60.4)	20.1 (68.2)	25.1 (77.2)	27.4 (81.3)	26.0 (78.8)	21.2 (70.2)	14.7 (58.5)	9.0 (48.2)	4.6 (40.3)	15.2 (59.4)
Mean daily minimum °C (°F)	−0.9 (30.4)	0.5 (32.9)	5.5 (41.9)	10.1 (50.2)	13.4 (56.1)	17.2 (63.0)	18.9 (66.0)	17.2 (63.0)	12.7 (54.9)	7.8 (46.0)	3.8 (38.8)	0.4 (32.7)	8.9 (48.0)
Record low °C (°F)	−26.6 (−15.9)	−17.6 (0.3)	−12.9 (8.8)	−6.1 (21.0)	1.2 (34.2)	8.4 (47.1)	10.9 (51.6)	8.2 (46.8)	−1.0 (30.2)	−4.4 (24.1)	−13.5 (7.7)	−19.5 (−3.1)	−26.6 (−15.9)
Average precipitation mm (inches)	100 (3.9)	95 (3.7)	102 (4.0)	112 (4.4)	75 (3.0)	17 (0.7)	4 (0.2)	1 (0.0)	4 (0.2)	29 (1.1)	55 (2.2)	60 (2.4)	654 (25.7)
Average precipitation days (≥ 1.0 mm)	8.5	9.1	13.4	9.8	7.8	1.5	0.7	0.1	0.8	3.7	5.3	8.1	68.8
Average relative humidity (%)	69	67	65	63	57	42	41	44	44	56	63	69	57
Mean monthly sunshine hours	120	121	156	198	281	337	352	338	289	224	164	119	2,699
Source 1: Pogoda.ru.net
Source 2: Deutscher Wetterdienst (humidity 1951–1993 and precipitation days 1961–1990) NOAA (sun, 1961–1990)

Climate data for Khujand (1961–1990, extremes 1936–present)
Month	Jan	Feb	Mar	Apr	May	Jun	Jul	Aug	Sep	Oct	Nov	Dec	Year
Record high °C (°F)	15.7 (60.3)	22.1 (71.8)	28.8 (83.8)	36.5 (97.7)	39.9 (103.8)	43.5 (110.3)	45.9 (114.6)	43.8 (110.8)	38.4 (101.1)	33.8 (92.8)	25.0 (77.0)	21.1 (70.0)	45.9 (114.6)
Mean daily maximum °C (°F)	3.5 (38.3)	6.2 (43.2)	13.8 (56.8)	21.9 (71.4)	28.6 (83.5)	34.2 (93.6)	35.5 (95.9)	32.4 (90.3)	28.8 (83.8)	20.6 (69.1)	12.3 (54.1)	5.6 (42.1)	20.3 (68.5)
Daily mean °C (°F)	−0.3 (31.5)	1.7 (35.1)	8.5 (47.3)	16.2 (61.2)	21.8 (71.2)	26.9 (80.4)	28.3 (82.9)	26.1 (79.0)	20.8 (69.4)	13.9 (57.0)	7.3 (45.1)	2.0 (35.6)	14.4 (57.9)
Mean daily minimum °C (°F)	−3.4 (25.9)	−1.8 (28.8)	4.2 (39.6)	10.7 (51.3)	15.5 (59.9)	19.6 (67.3)	21.2 (70.2)	18.8 (65.8)	13.6 (56.5)	8.1 (46.6)	3.4 (38.1)	−0.5 (31.1)	9.1 (48.4)
Record low °C (°F)	−22.8 (−9.0)	−22.2 (−8.0)	−13.6 (7.5)	−3.9 (25.0)	0.8 (33.4)	8.7 (47.7)	10.5 (50.9)	7.0 (44.6)	1.4 (34.5)	−6.8 (19.8)	−18.8 (−1.8)	−20.0 (−4.0)	−22.8 (−9.0)
Average precipitation mm (inches)	15.7 (0.62)	15.7 (0.62)	26.1 (1.03)	31.4 (1.24)	17.2 (0.68)	4.6 (0.18)	2.3 (0.09)	1.7 (0.07)	2.7 (0.11)	16.9 (0.67)	13.7 (0.54)	16.8 (0.66)	164.8 (6.49)
Average precipitation days	11.4	11.0	12.7	12.6	12.0	6.3	4.1	2.6	3.2	6.8	7.4	10.4	100.5
Average relative humidity (%)	77.8	75.4	64.0	56.3	48.7	34.8	33.8	38.4	43.3	55.4	75.2	76.4	56.6
Mean monthly sunshine hours	126	131	168	211	297	358	382	363	300	225	160	106	2,827
Source 1: World Meteorological Organisation (average high and low/precipitation/precipitation days 1961–1990) NOAA (mean temperatures and sun 1961–1990)
Source 2: climatebase.ru (humidity), Meteo Climat (record highs and lows)

== Environmental problems ==
Most of Tajikistan's environmental problems are associated with the agricultural policies imposed on the country during the Soviet period. By 1991 heavy use of mineral fertilizers and agricultural chemicals was a major cause of pollution in the republic. Among those chemicals were DDT, banned by international convention, and several defoliants and herbicides. In addition to the damage they have done to the air, land, and water, the chemicals have contaminated the cottonseeds whose oil is used widely for cooking. Cotton farmers and their families are at particular risk from the overuse of agricultural chemicals, both from direct physical contact in the field and from the use of the branches of cotton plants at home for fuel. All of these toxic sources are believed to contribute to a high incidence of maternal and child mortality and birth defects. In 1994 the infant mortality rate was 43.2 per 1,000 births, the second highest rate among former Soviet republics. The rate in 1990 had been 40.0 infant deaths per 1,000 births.

Cotton requires particularly intense irrigation. In Tajikistan's cotton-growing regions, farms were established in large, semiarid tracts and in tracts reclaimed from the desert, but cotton's growing season is summer, when the region receives virtually no rainfall. The 50 percent increase in cotton cultivation mandated by Soviet and post-Soviet agricultural planners between 1964 and 1994 consequently overtaxed the regional water supply. Poorly designed irrigation networks led to massive runoff, which increased soil salinity and carried toxic agricultural chemicals downstream to other fields, the Aral Sea, and populated areas of the region.

By the 1980s, nearly 90 percent of water use in Central Asia was for agriculture. Of that quantity, nearly 75 percent came from the Amu Darya and the Syr Darya, the chief tributaries of the Aral Sea on the Kazakhstan-Uzbekistan border to the northwest of Tajikistan. As the desiccation of the Aral Sea came to international attention in the 1980s, water-use policy became a contentious issue between Soviet republics such as Tajikistan, where the main rivers rise, and those farther downstream, including Uzbekistan. By the end of the Soviet era, the central government had relinquished central control of water-use policy for Central Asia, but the republics had not agreed on an allocation policy.

Industry also causes pollution problems. A major offender is the production of nonferrous metals. One of Tajikistan's leading industrial sites, the aluminum plant at Tursunzoda (formerly known as Regar), west of Dushanbe near the border with Uzbekistan, generates large amounts of toxic waste gases that have been blamed for a sharp increase in the number of birth defects among people who live within range of its emissions.

In 1992 the Supreme Soviet of Tajikistan established a Ministry of Environmental Protection. However, the enforcement activity of the ministry was limited severely by the political upheavals that plagued Tajikistan in its first years of independence. The only registered private environmental group in Tajikistan in the early 1990s was a chapter of the Social-Ecological Alliance, the largest informal environmental association in the former Soviet Union. The Tajik branch's main functions have been to conduct environmental research and to organize protests against the Roghun Hydroelectric Plant project.

Natural hazards: Earthquakes are of varying degrees and are frequent. Flooding and landslides sometimes occur during the annual Spring thaw.

Environment - current issues: inadequate sanitation facilities; increasing levels of soil salinity; industrial pollution; excessive pesticides; part of the basin of the shrinking Aral Sea suffers from severe overutilization of available water for irrigation and associated pollution.

Environment - international agreements:
party to: Biodiversity, Climate Change, Desertification, Environmental Modification, Ozone Layer Protection

== Pamir Mountains ==
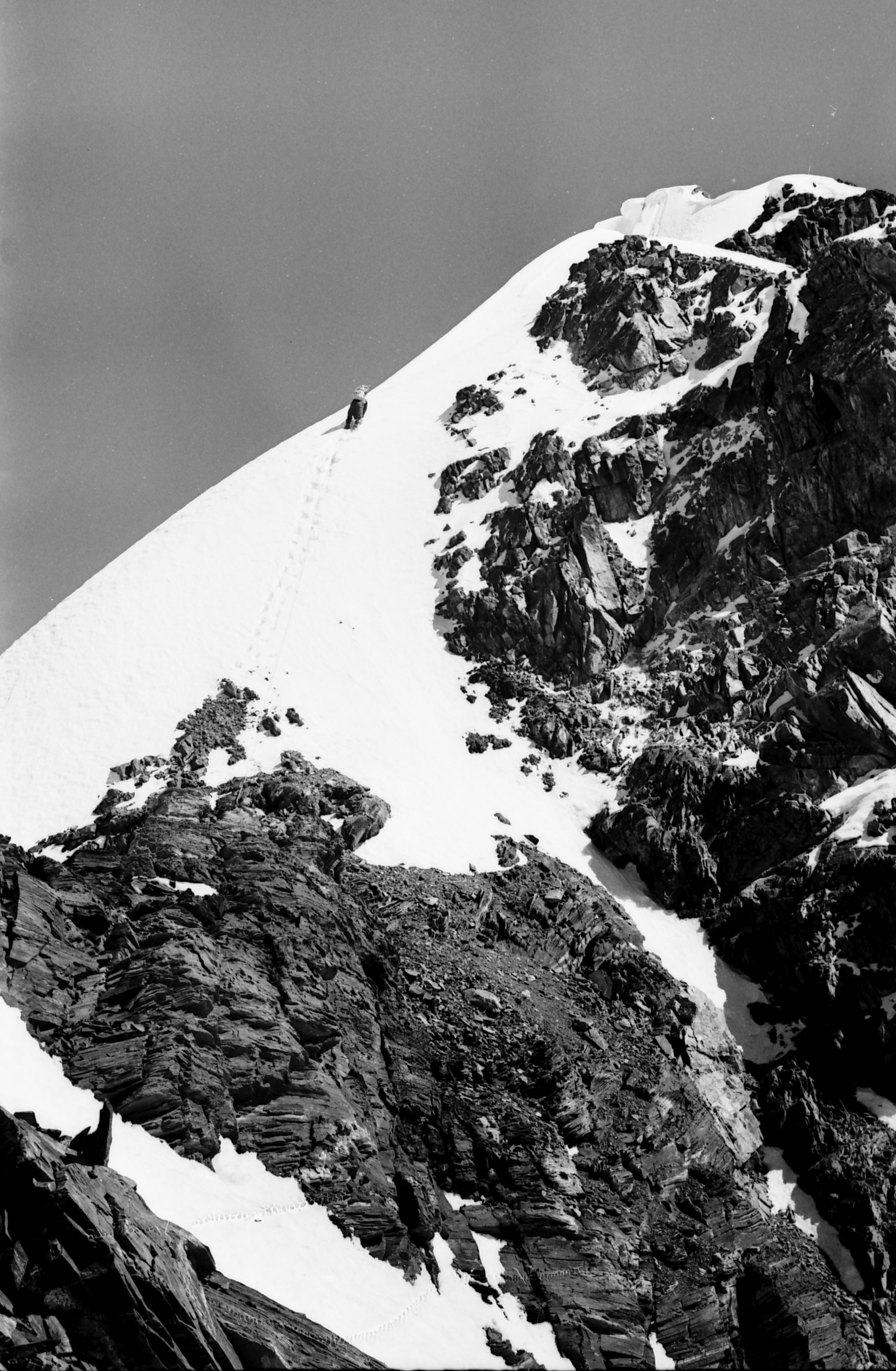
Tartu Ülikool 350 is a 6,258-meter peak in Pamir Mountains.

Tajikistan is home to some of the highest mountains in the world, including the Pamir and Alay ranges. 93% of Tajikistan is mountainous with altitudes ranging from 300 m (980 ft) to almost 7,500 m (24,600 ft), and nearly 50% of Tajikistan's territory is above 3,000 m (9,800 ft).

The massive mountain ranges are cut by hundreds of canyons and gorges at the bottom of which run streams that flow into larger river valleys where the majority of the country's population lives and works. The Pamirs in particular are heavily glaciated, and Tajikistan is home to the largest non-polar glacier in the world, the Fedchenko Glacier.

The Pamir Mountains in Tajikistan lie in Gorno-Badakhshan Autonomous Province (GBAO) in the east half of the country. The northern border is formed by the Trans-Alay Range (Independence Peak 7,174 m (23,537 ft), Kyzylart Pass 4,280 m (14,040 ft)). The highest peak is Ismoil Somoni Peak (7,495 m (24,590 ft)) (formerly known as Stalin Peak and Communism Peak), on the north-western edge of GBAO. It lies between Ibn Sina Peak (7,134 m (23,406 ft)) (also known as Lenin Peak) on the border with Kyrgyzstan to the north and Peak Korzhenevskaya (7,105 m (23,310 ft)) in Academy of Sciences Range (6,785 m (22,260 ft)) further south. The southern border is formed by the northernmost ridges of the Karakoram Range, with Mayakovskiy Peak (6,096 m (20,000 ft)), Karl Marx Peak (6,726 m (22,067 ft)), Engels Peak (6,510 m (21,360 ft)), and Concord Peak (5,469 m (17,943 ft)) stretching west to east along the border to Afghanistan.

== Rivers ==
The principal rivers of Central Asia, the Amu Darya and the Syr Darya, both flow through Tajikistan, fed by melting snow and glaciers from the mountains of Tajikistan and Kyrgyzstan. There are over 900 rivers in Tajikistan longer than 10 kilometres (6.2 mi).

The largest rivers of Tajikistan are:

- Amu Darya/Panj
- Bartang
- Gunt
- Kofarnihon (Kafirnigan)
- Kyzylsu
- Mughob
- Murghab
- Obihingou
- Oksu
- Syr Darya
- Surkhandarya
- Vakhsh/Surkhob
- Vanj
- Yazgulyam
- Zeravshan

== Lakes ==
About 2% of the country's area is covered by lakes:

- Kayrakum (Qairoqqum) Reservoir (Sughd)
- Iskanderkul (Fann Mountains)
- Kulikalon (Kul-i Kalon) (Fann Mountains)
- Nurek Reservoir (Khatlon)
- Bulunkul (Pamir)
- Drumkul (Pamir)
- Karakul (Tajik: Qarokul; eastern Pamir)
- Rangkul (Pamir)
- Sarez (Pamir)
- Sasykkul (Pamir)
- Shadau Lake (Pamir)
- Shorkul (Pamir)
- Turumtaikul (Pamir)
- Tuzkul (Pamir)
- Yashilkul (Pamir)
- Zorkul (Pamir)

== Severnyy Island ==
Ostrov Severnyy (Russian: Северный остров; Tajik: Ҷазираи Шимолӣ, Jazirai Shimolī; "Northern Island", also spelled as "Severny Island"), more commonly known as Severnyy Island, is a freshwater island located in the eastern basin of Lake Karakul, within the Gorno-Badakhshan Autonomous Region of Tajikistan. Recognized as the largest island in the country, it is notable for its location within the high-altitude Karakul meteorite impact crater in the Pamir Mountains. The island lies in the northern part of Lake Karakul, which sits at approximately 3,960 meters (12,992 ft) above sea level, and measures about 8 km (5.0 mi) long by 4 km (2.5 mi) wide, covering an area of roughly 22 km^{2} (8.5 sq mi). Along with a large peninsula to the south, Severnyy Island divides the lake into two hydrological basins—a deeper western basin and the shallower eastern basin it occupies—and is part of the crater's central uplift. Geological evidence indicates that in the 19th century the island was connected to the northern shore by a narrow isthmus, which has since submerged. The region endures an extreme high-mountain desert climate (Köppen BWk) with minimal annual precipitation (20–30 mm), brackish lake water, and ice cover from late November to April, resulting in a barren, rocky landscape with sparse steppe vegetation. Despite these harsh conditions, the Lake Karakul area, including Severnyy Island, is designated an Important Bird Area by BirdLife International, serving as a seasonal stopover and breeding ground for migratory species such as the bar-headed goose (Anser indicus), ruddy shelduck (Tadorna ferruginea), and brown-headed gull (Chroicocephalus brunnicephalus).

== Area and boundaries ==
Area
- total: 142,600 km^{2} (55,100 sq mi)
  - country rank in the world: 94th
- land: 141,510 km^{2} (54,640 sq mi)
- water: 2,590 km^{2} (1,000 sq mi)

Area — comparative
- slightly smaller than Nepal
- Australia comparative: slightly more than twice the size of Tasmania
- Canada comparative: slightly less than twice the size of New Brunswick
- United Kingdom comparative: slightly larger than England
- United States comparative: slightly larger than North Carolina
- EU comparative: slightly larger than Greece

Land boundaries
- total: 3,651 km (2,269 mi)
- border countries: Afghanistan 1,206 km (749 mi), China 414 km (257 mi), Kyrgyzstan 870 km (540 mi), Uzbekistan 1,161 km (721 mi)

Coastline
0 km (0 mi) (landlocked)

Elevation extremes
- lowest point: Syr Darya 300 m (980 ft)
- highest point: Ismoil Somoni Peak 7,495 m (24,590 ft)

Other peaks include: Lenin Peak 7,134 m (23,406 ft); Peak Korzhenevskaya 7,105 m (23,310 ft); Independence Peak 6,974 m (22,881 ft)

== Resources and land use ==
Natural resources: hydropower, some petroleum, uranium, mercury, brown coal, lead, zinc, antimony, tungsten, silver, gold

Land use (2006 data):
arable land: 6%
permanent crops: 1%
pastures: 21%
non-agricultural land: 72%
including forests and woodland: 3%

Irrigated land:
2006: 7,235 km^{2} (2,793 sq mi)

Total renewable water resources: 99.7 cu km (1997)

Natural hazards: earthquakes, floods

== See also ==
- Timeline of Tajikistani history
- Bibliography of Tajikistani history
- Outline of Tajikistan
