= Djavshangoz Important Bird Area =

Tract of land in Gorno-Badakhshan Autonomous Province, Tajikistan

Coordinates: 37°25′33″N 72°29′13″E

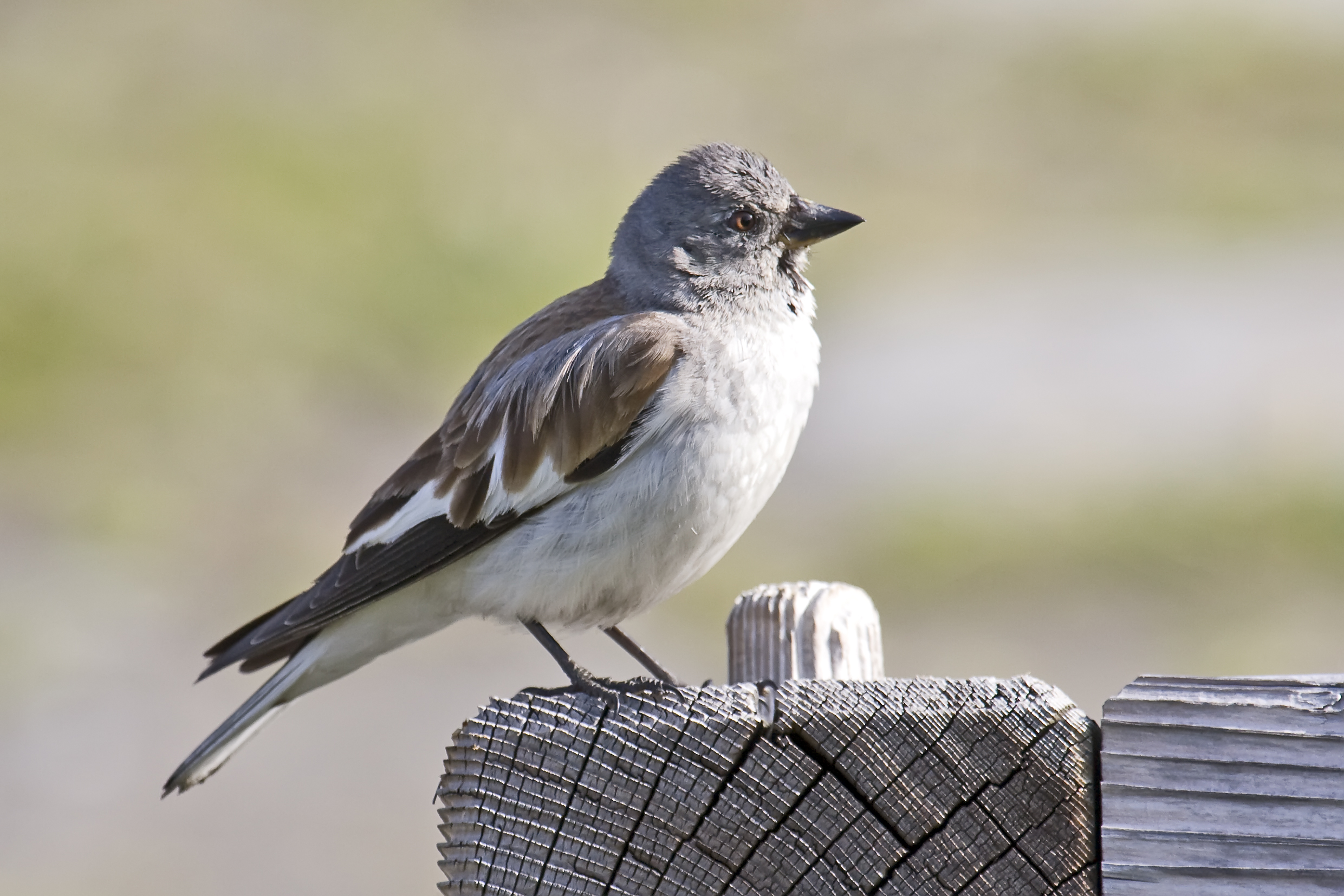
An estimated 20–30 pairs of white-winged snowfinches breed in the IBA.

The Djavshangoz Important Bird Area (Chinese: 贾夫尚戈斯重点鸟区), also spelt Dzhavshangoz (Chinese: 贾夫尚戈斯), is a 345 km^{2} tract of land in southern Gorno-Badakhshan Autonomous Province in eastern Tajikistan. It has been identified by BirdLife International as an Important Bird Area (IBA).

== Description ==
The site lies some 110 km east of the provincial capital of Khorog in the Pamir Mountains. The most important features within the IBA are the Djavshangoz and Turumtaykul valleys. The Djavshangoz valley is 3400 m above sea level and forms a wide plain between the Shungan and Shakhdara ridges. In the middle section of the valley, river floods create islands which attract waterbirds. The Turumtaykul valley is 4500 m above sea level and divides the Shungan ridge into northern and southern parts. Turumtaykul lake is located in the central part of the valley and forms the core zone of the IBA. Much of the site is used as pasture, with arable land being scarce. Two settlements within the IBA, Djavshangoz and Barchid, have a combined population of about 750.

== Birds ==
The site qualifies as an IBA because it supports significant numbers of the populations of various bird species, either as residents, or as breeding or passage migrants. These include Himalayan snowcocks, ruddy shelducks, common mergansers, saker falcons, Himalayan vultures, cinereous vultures, yellow-billed choughs, Hume's larks, sulphur-bellied warblers, wallcreepers, Himalayan rubythroats, white-winged redstarts, white-winged snowfinches, alpine accentors, rufous-streaked accentors, brown accentors, water pipits, plain mountain finches, black-headed mountain finches, crimson-winged finches, red-mantled rosefinches, Caucasian great rosefinches and red-fronted rosefinches.
