= Bulunkul and Yashilkul lakes and mountains Important Bird Area =

Bird Area

Coordinates: 37°50′07″N 73°00′59″E

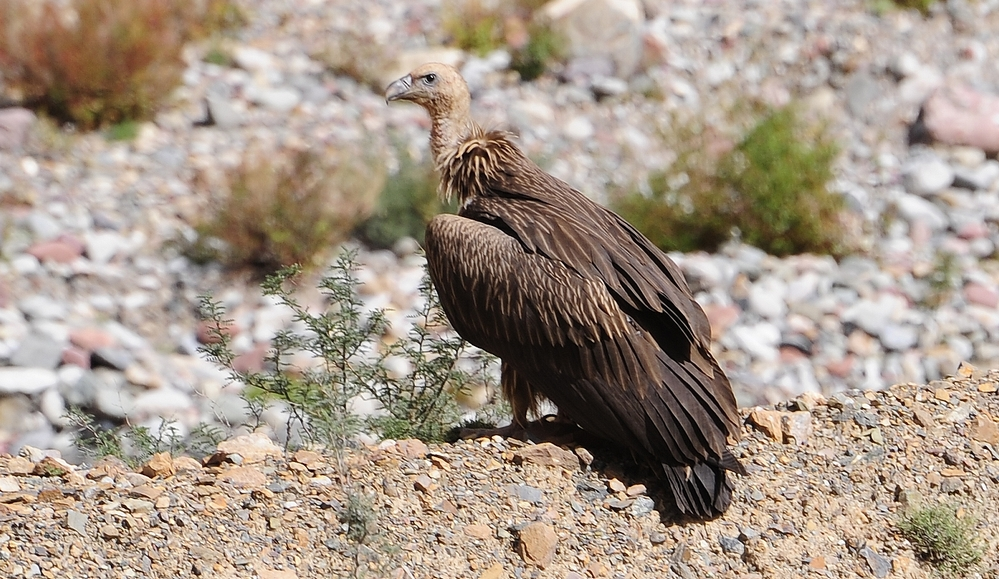
The IBA supports 4-5 breeding pairs of Himalayan vultures.

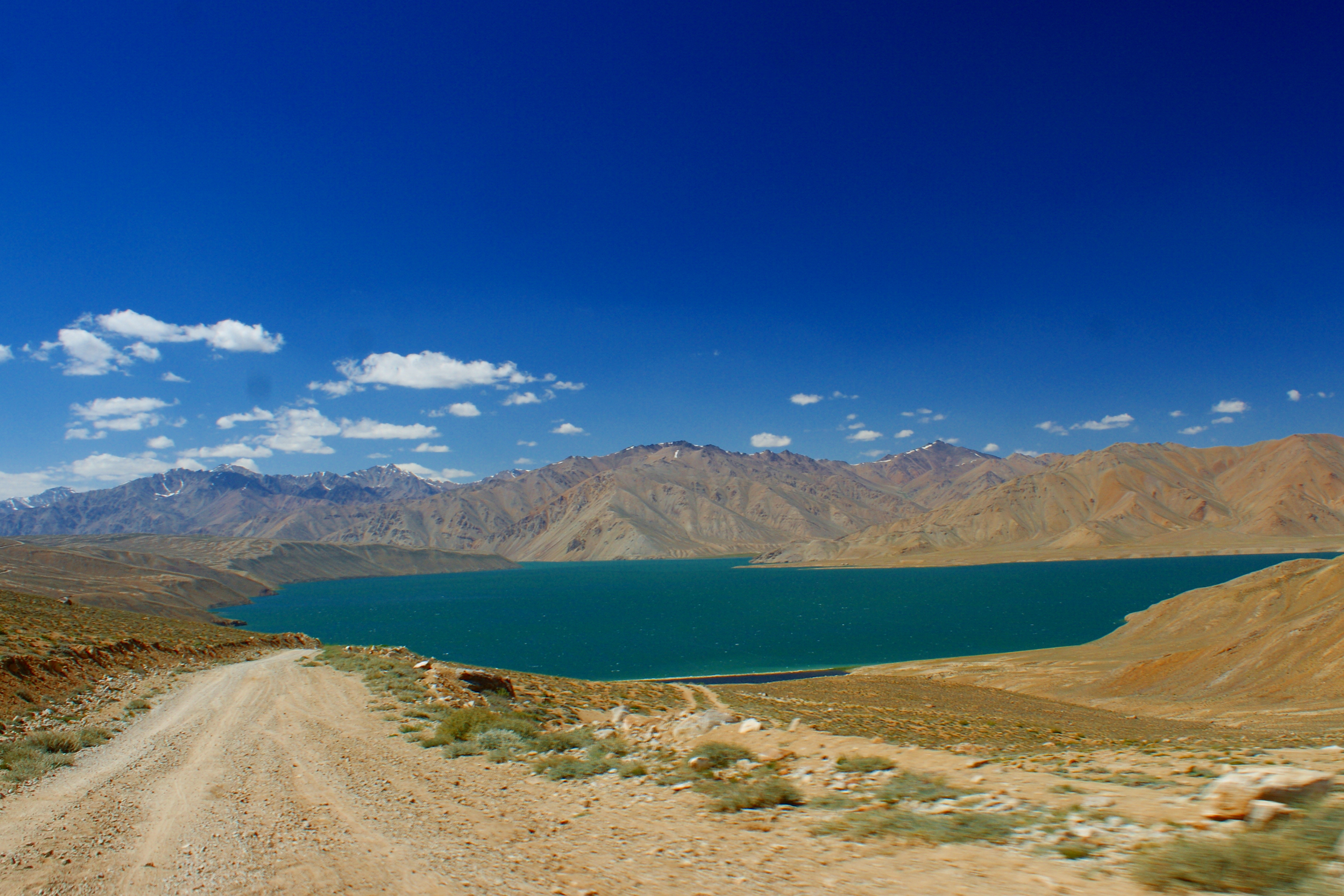
Bulunkul lake

The Bulunkul and Yashilkul lakes and mountains Important Bird Area (Chinese: 布伦库勒和雅什库勒湖和山脉重点鸟区) is a 1500 km^{2} tract of land in the Pamir Mountains of Gorno-Badakhshan Autonomous Province in southeast Tajikistan. It contains grassland, desert, wetland and rock habitats.

== Description ==
The Important Bird Area (IBA) has a complicated topography of sparsely vegetated mountain slopes and broad highland valleys containing the large freshwater lakes of Bulunkul, Yashilkul and other wetlands. Its altitude ranges from about 3200 m to 5700 m above sea level. In the north there are scree-sloped mountain ranges cut by the gorges of the Kichik, Marjanay and Okjilga rivers flowing into Yashilkul. The central lakes are surrounded by sand and pebble plains, marshes, wet meadows and peat bogs. About half the area of the IBA lies within the Pamir National Park.

== Birds ==
The site was identified as an IBA by BirdLife International because it supports significant numbers of the populations of various bird species, either as residents or as breeding or passage migrants. These include Himalayan snowcocks, bar-headed geese, ruddy shelducks, common mergansers, saker falcons, Himalayan vultures, eastern imperial eagles, lesser sand plovers, brown-headed gulls, yellow-billed choughs, Hume's larks, sulphur-bellied warblers, wallcreepers, white-winged redstarts, white-winged snowfinches, water pipits, black-headed mountain finches, Caucasian great rosefinches and red-fronted rosefinches.
