= Drumkul =

Lake in Gorno-Badakhshan, Tajikistan

- Location within Tajikistan
- Interactive map of Drumkul
- Location: Gorno-Badakhshan Autonomous Province, Tajikistan
- Coordinates: 37°16′50″N 72°05′35″E
- Type: reservoir
- Max. length: 3.5 kilometres (2.2 mi)
- Max. width: 200 metres (660 ft) - 300 metres (980 ft)
- Max. depth: 45 metres (148 ft)
- Surface elevation: 3,345 metres (10,974 ft)

Drumkul, also spelt Dirumkul, is an artificial freshwater lake in southern Gorno-Badakhshan Autonomous Province in eastern Tajikistan. The lake and its surrounds have been identified by BirdLife International as a 380 km^{2} Important Bird Area (IBA).

== Description ==
Drumkul lies some 75 km east of the provincial capital of Khorog, in the northern part of the Shugnanskiy ridge of the Pamir Mountains. The area has a semi-arid climate. The lake is 3345 m above sea level and was formed by damming the Dumdara River, a tributary of the Shohdara river, which is fed by meltwater from the glaciers of the Rushan ridge. It is 3.5 km long, 200–300 m wide and has a maximum depth of 45 m. It contains submerged aquatic vegetation.

== Birds ==
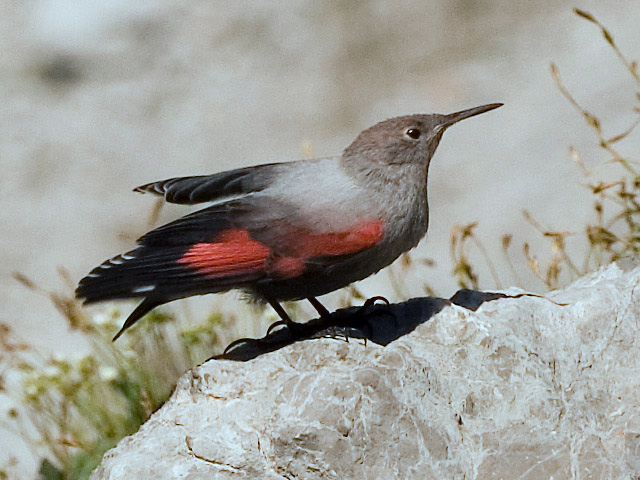
An estimated 12–16 pairs of wallcreepers breed in the IBA.

The site qualifies as an IBA because the lake and its environs support significant numbers of the populations of various bird species, either as residents, or as breeding or passage migrants. These include Himalayan snowcocks, ruddy shelducks, common mergansers, saker falcons, Himalayan vultures, ibisbills, snow pigeons, yellow-billed choughs, Hume's larks, sulphur-bellied warblers, wallcreepers, Himalayan rubythroats, white-winged redstarts, white-winged snowfinches, alpine accentors, rufous-streaked accentors, brown accentors, water pipits, plain mountain finches, black-headed mountain finches, crimson-winged finches, red-mantled rosefinches, Caucasian great rosefinches and red-fronted rosefinches.
