= Rangkul Valley Important Bird Area =

Tajikistan nature preserve

Coordinates: 38°30′14″N 74°27′41″E

Designations

Ramsar Wetland
- Official name: Shorkul and Rangkul Lakes
- Designated: 18 July 2001
- Reference no.: 1085

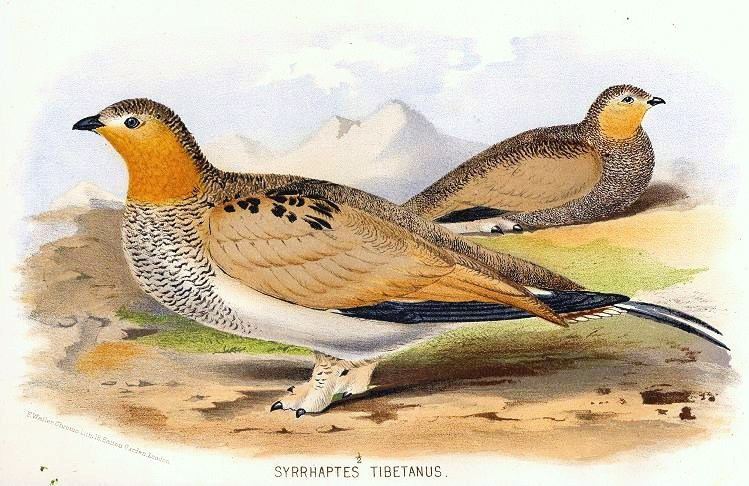
Tibetan sandgrouse breed in the IBA.

The Rangkul Valley Important Bird Area (Chinese: 郎庫勒河谷重点鸟区) is a 1612 km^{2} tract of land in eastern Gorno-Badakhshan Autonomous Province in eastern Tajikistan, not far from the border with China. It contains two high altitude lakes and has been identified by BirdLife International as an Important Bird Area (IBA), as well as a Ramsar site.

== Description ==
The Rangkul Valley is an inter-mountain trough in the eastern Pamir Mountains 60 km north-east of the district centre of Murghab. The central part of the IBA, at an altitude of 3600–4000 m, contains two lakes, Rangkul and Shorkul, which form an endorheic system and are connected by the Izyuk channel. Rangkul is a freshwater lake with an area of 8 km^{2} and a depth of 6 m. Shorkul is brackish; it has an area of 7 km^{2}. Both lakes freeze in winter and contain no fish, but support numerous invertebrates, including amphipods, beetles and mosquito larvae. Apart from the lakes and their littoral zones the valley is predominantly alpine semi-desert with scattered shrubs and is subject to strong winds. It is threatened by overgrazing, which leads to increased wind erosion and desertification.

== Birds ==
The most favourable habitats for birdlife are along the rivers and lake shores. The site was classified as an IBA because it supports significant numbers of the populations of various bird species, either as residents, or as breeding or passage migrants; it has been designated as a protected Ramsar site since 2001. These include Tibetan snowcocks, Himalayan snowcocks, bar-headed geese ruddy shelducks, saker falcons, Himalayan vultures, lesser sand plovers, brown-headed gulls, Tibetan sandgrouse, yellow-billed choughs, Hume's larks, wallcreepers, white-winged redstarts, white-winged snowfinches, rufous-streaked accentors, brown accentors, black-headed mountain finches, Caucasian great rosefinches and red-fronted rosefinches.
