= Kulikalon Lakes =

Group of three lakes in Tajikistan

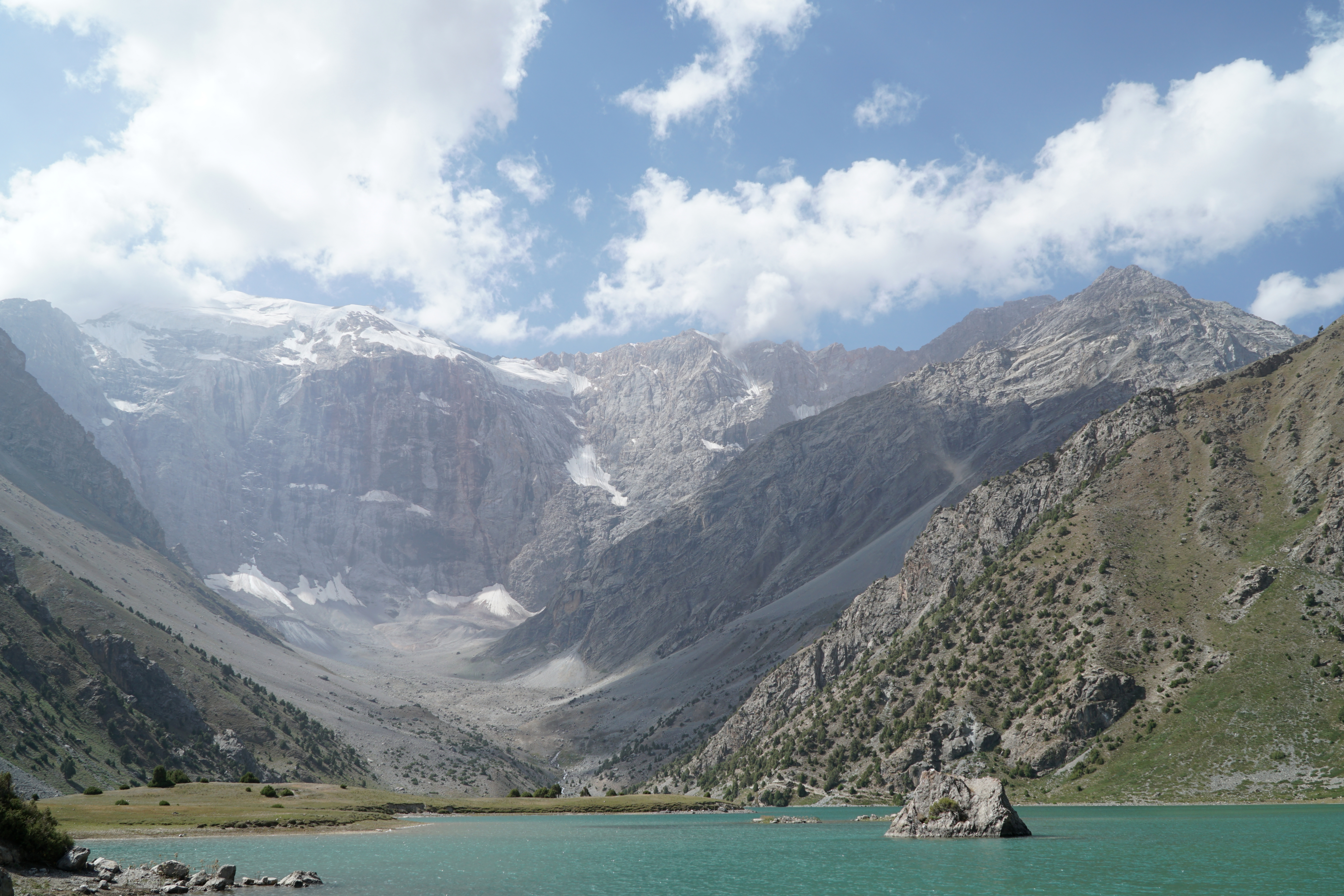
- Kulikalon Lakes and Fann Mountains

- Location within Tajikistan
- Interactive map of Kulikalon Lakes
- Coordinates: 39°15′25″N 68°09′49″E
- Type: Lake
- Primary inflows: Glacier
- Primary outflows: none
- Surface elevation: 2,800 metres (9,200 ft)
- Settlements: Sughd, Tajikistan

The Kulikalon Lakes, also spelt Kul-i Kalon, are a group of three glacial lakes, or tarns, in the Zeravshan Mountains of south-western Sughd Province in western Tajikistan. The lakes and their surrounds have been identified by BirdLife International as an Important Bird Area (IBA).

== Description ==
The lakes are 55 km (34 mi) southeast of the district centre of Panjakent. They lie in the Kulikalon cirque among remnants of juniper forest. They are fed by meltwater from the Chimtarga glacier, with water levels peaking in summer, and are drained by the Artuch River. The middle part of the cirque is at an altitude of 2,800 m (9,200 ft) above sea level with the adjacent mountains rising to 3,000–3,500 m (9,800–11,500 ft). The area contains the largest remaining blocks of juniper forest in the western half of the Zeravshan Range, on the edge of the Chimtarga massif. The area around the lakes is used as pasture.

== Birds ==
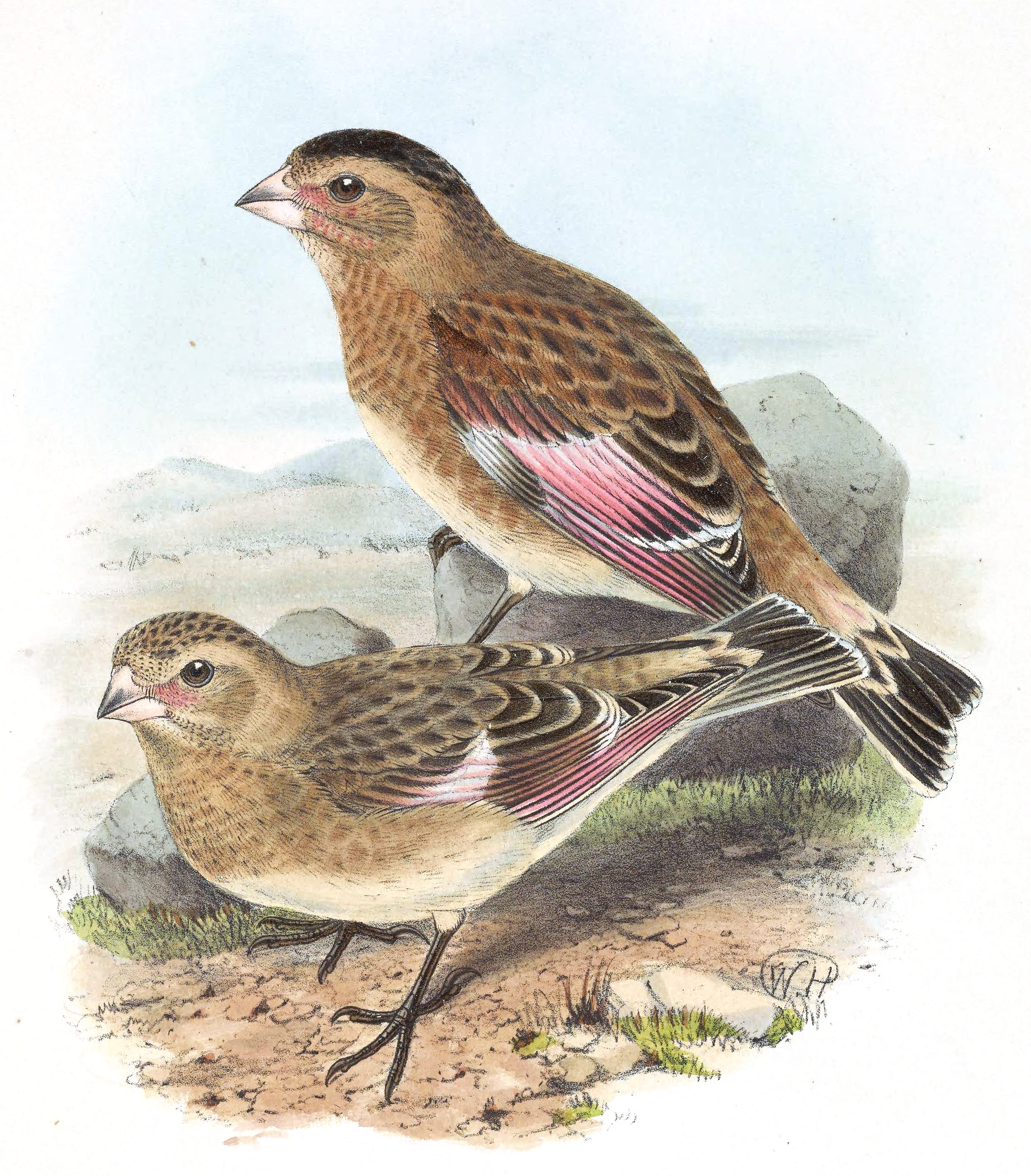
Crimson-winged finches breed in the IBA

The site was classified as an IBA because it supports significant numbers of the populations of various bird species, either as residents, or as breeding or passage migrants. These include Himalayan snowcocks, saker falcons, Himalayan vultures, solitary snipe, yellow-billed choughs, Hume's larks, sulphur-bellied warblers, wallcreepers, white-winged redstarts, brown accentors, water pipits, crimson-winged finches and white-winged grosbeaks.
