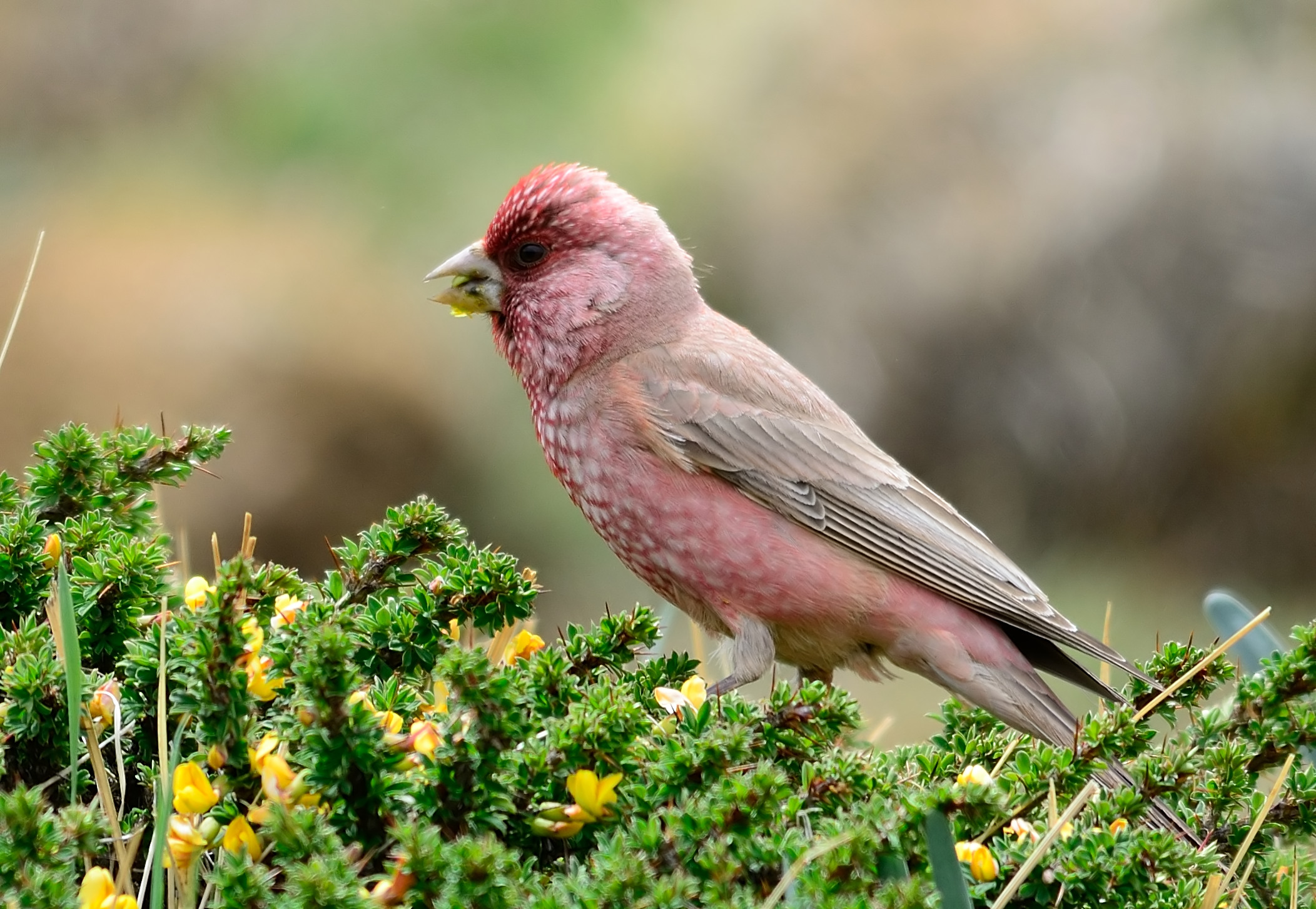
- Male at Kibber

Scientific classification
- Kingdom: Animalia
- Phylum: Chordata
- Class: Aves
- Order: Passeriformes
- Family: Fringillidae
- Subfamily: Carduelinae
- Genus: Carpodacus
- Species: C. rubicilla
- Subspecies: C. r. severtzovi

Trinomial name
- Carpodacus rubicilla severtzovi (Sharpe, 1886)

= Spotted great rosefinch =

Subspecies of bird

The spotted great rosefinch or spotted rosefinch (Carpodacus rubicilla severtzovi) is a finch in the family Fringillidae. It is found in Kashmir, Nepal, Tibet, and southwestern China.

Its natural habitats are tundra and temperate grassland.

It was formerly considered a distinct species, but is now commonly regarded as a subspecies of the great rosefinch.
