= Turumtaykul =

- Turumtaikul
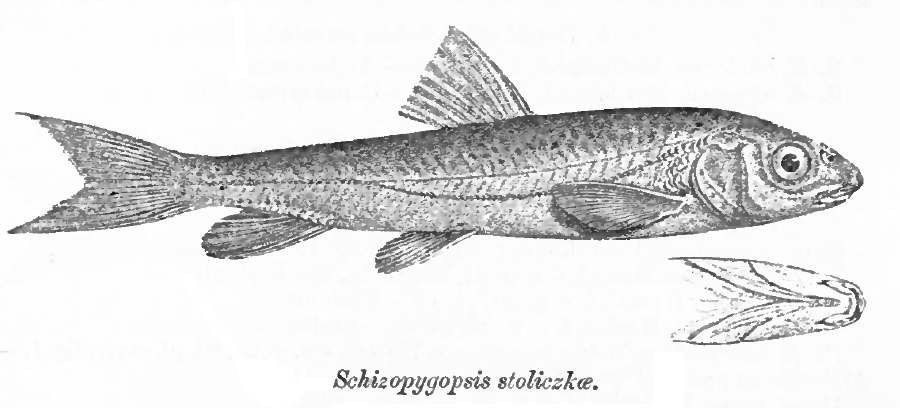
- Schizopygopsis stoliczkai lake dwelling

- Location within Tajikistan
- Interactive map of Turumtaykul
- Location: Tajikistan
- Coordinates: 37°29′00″N 72°32′00″E
- Type: freshwater mountain valley lake
- Max. length: 7 km (4.3 mi)
- Max. width: 2 km (1.2 mi)
- Surface area: 900 ha (2,200 acres)
- Max. depth: 18 m (59 ft)

Turumtaykul (Chinese: 图伦泰庫勒), also spelled Turumtaikul (Russian: Турумтайкуль; Tajik: Турумтайкӯл), is a freshwater mountain valley lake in Gorno-Badakhshan Autonomous Region, in the south-east Tajikistan, about 110 kilometres (68 mi) east of the provincial capital of Khorugh. Lying in the Pamir Mountains at 4,202 m (13,786 ft) above sea level, it is 7 by 2 km (4.3 by 1.2 mi), and has an area of 900 ha (2,200 acres) with a maximum depth of 18 m (59 ft). Its most numerous fish are Sattar snowtrout and false osman. The lake forms part of the Djavshangoz Important Bird Area.
