= Yashilkul =

- Яшилькуль (Russian); Яшилкӯл (Tajik)
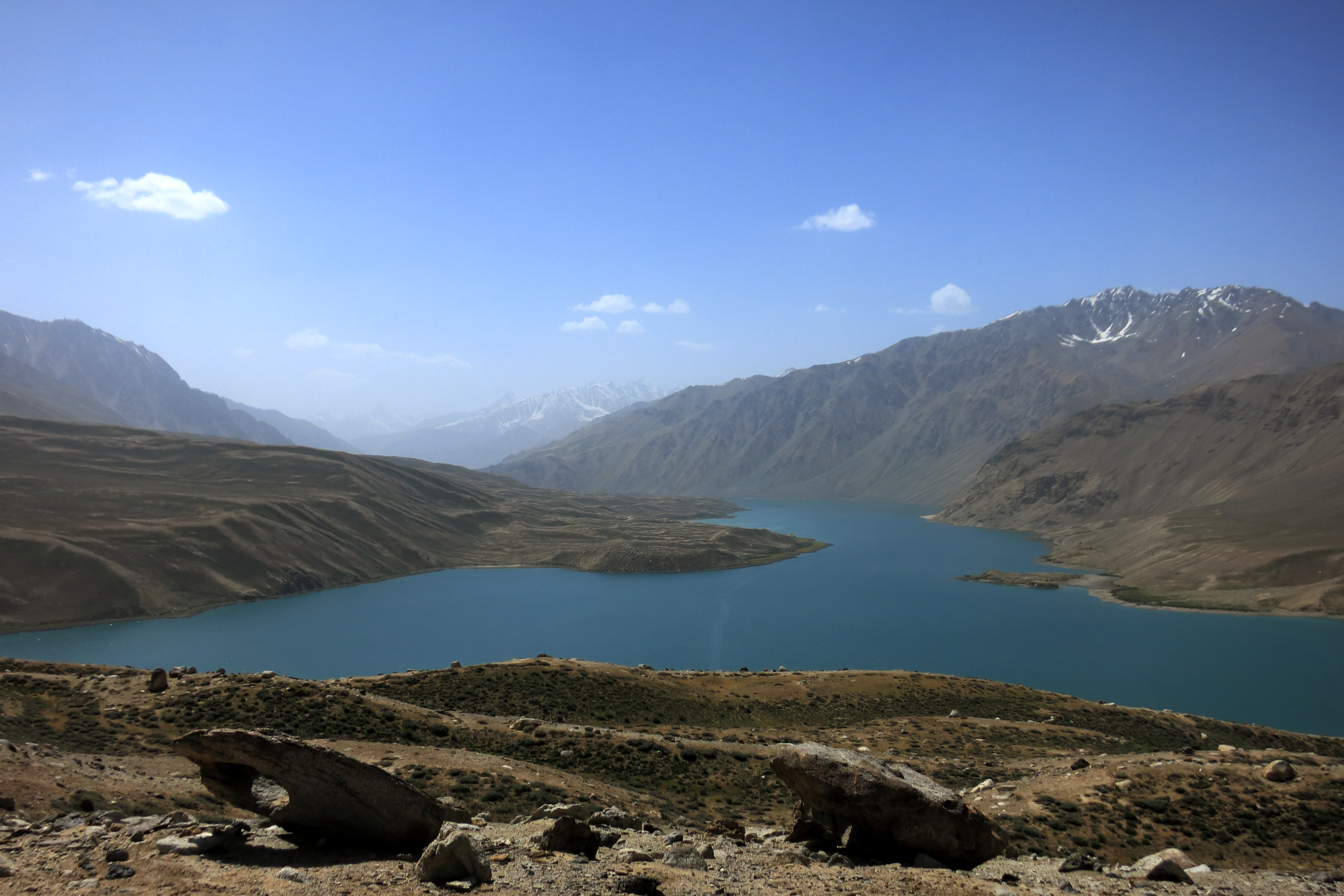
- Yashilkul

- Location within Tajikistan
- Interactive map of Yashilkul
- Location: Gorno-Badakhshan Autonomous Province, Tajikistan
- Coordinates: 37°45′00″N 72°54′00″E
- Type: lake
- Surface area: 3,600 hectares (8,900 acres)
- Max. depth: 52 metres (171 ft)

Yashilkul (Russian: Яшилькуль; Tajik: Яшилкӯл) is a freshwater lake in Gorno-Badakhshan Autonomous Province, in southeast Tajikistan, about 130 kilometres (81 mi) east of the provincial capital of Khorugh. Lying in the upper Gunt valley of the Pamir Mountains, it has an area of 3,600 hectares (8,900 acres) with a maximum depth of 52 metres (171 ft). It lies 1.5 kilometres (0.93 mi) from a similar lake, Bulunkul, both of which are surrounded by other wetlands as well as sand and pebble plains. The lake forms part of the Bulunkul and Yashilkul lakes and mountains Important Bird Area.
