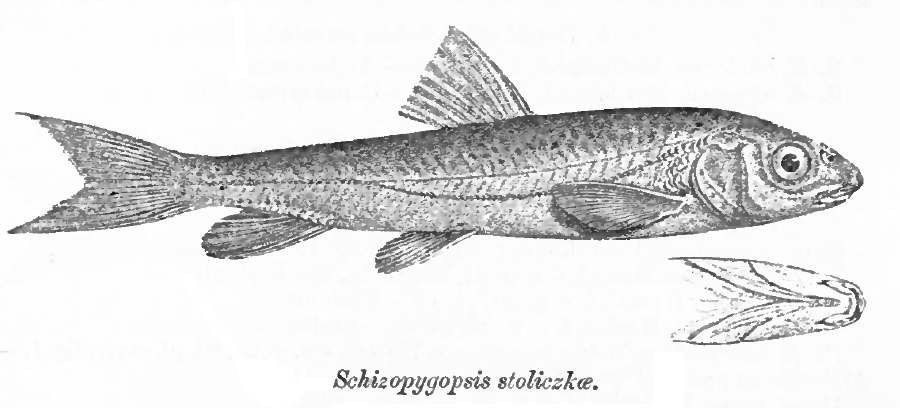

Conservation status
- Least Concern (IUCN 3.1)

Scientific classification
- Kingdom: Animalia
- Phylum: Chordata
- Class: Actinopterygii
- Division: Teleostei
- Order: Cypriniformes
- Family: Cyprinidae
- Genus: Schizopygopsis
- Species: S. stolickai

Binomial name
- Schizopygopsis stolickai Steindachner, 1866

Synonyms
- Schizopygopsis sewerzowi Herzenstein, 1891; Schizopygopsis stoliczkai Steindachner, 1866; Gymnocypris biswasi Talwar, 1977

= False osman =

Species of fish

The false osman (Schizopygopsis stolickai) is an Asian cyprinid freshwater fish living in the highlands of Afghanistan, southwestern China, Iran, northern India, Kyrgyzstan, Pakistan and Tajikistan. Young individuals and small adults live in shallow streams and pools, while large adults inhabit the main river and lakes. It grows to 34 cm (13 in) in total length.

== Etymology ==
The fish is named in honor of paleontologist Ferdinand Stoliczka (1838–1874), who collected the type specimen.
