= Bulunkul =

Lake in Gorno-Badakhshan Autonomous Province, Tajikistan

- Булункӯл
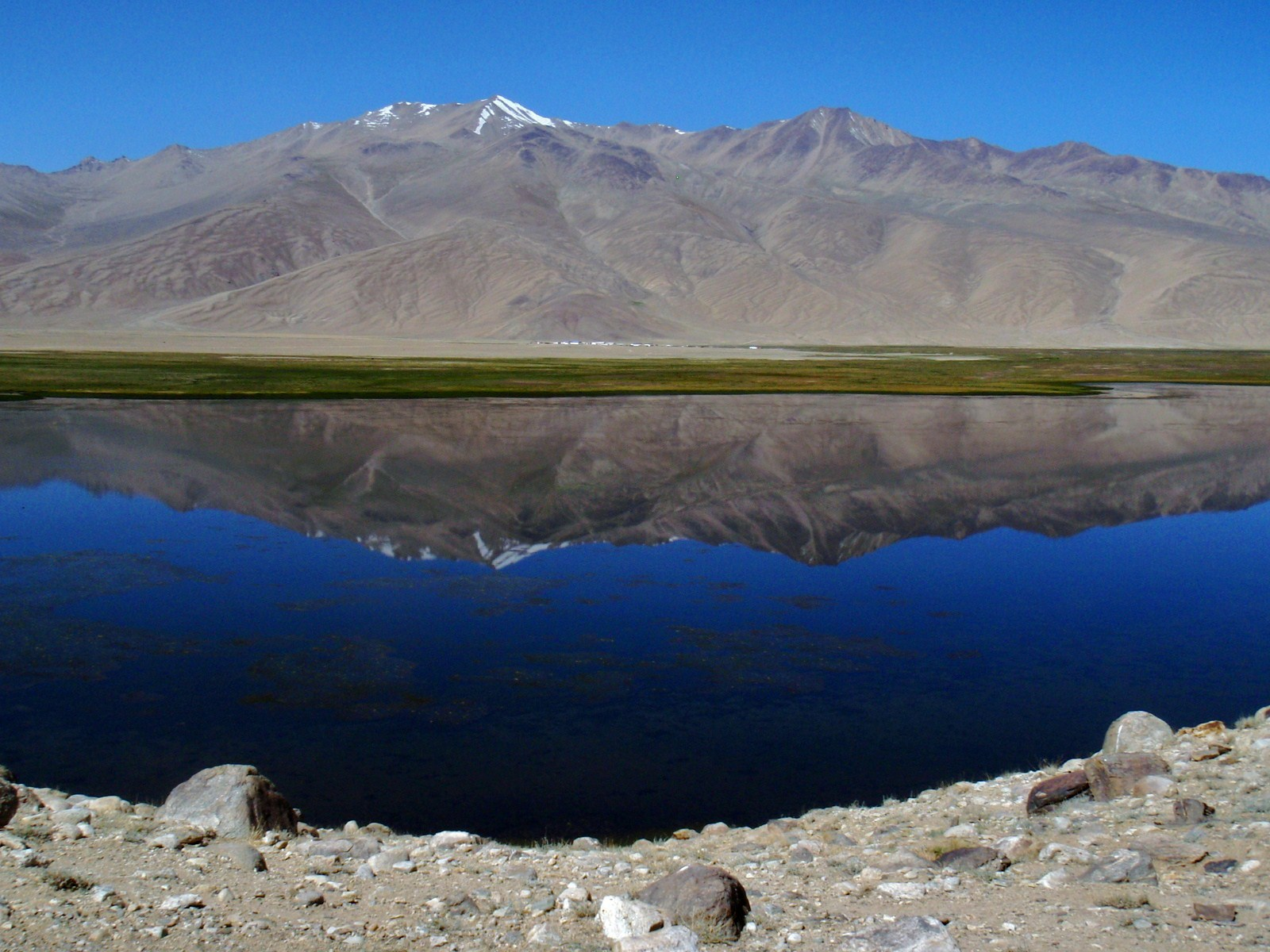

- Location in Tajikistan
- Interactive map of Bulunkul
- Location: Gorno-Badakhshan Autonomous Province
- Coordinates: 37°43′10″N 72°57′20″E
- Catchment area: 179 km^{2} (69 sq mi)
- Basin countries: Tajikistan
- Surface area: 3,900 ha (9,600 acres)
- Max. depth: 6 m (20 ft)

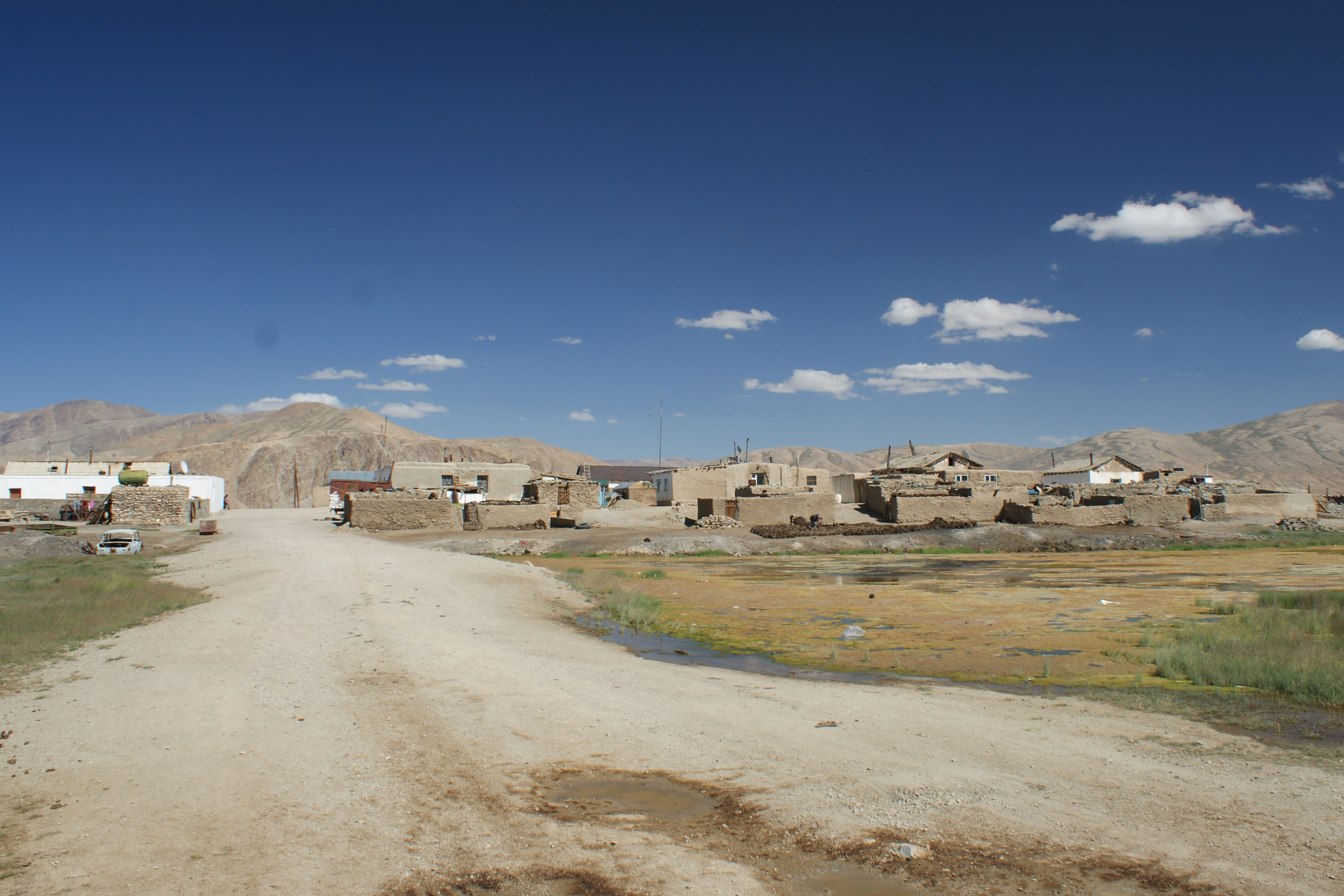
Bulunkul Village

Bulunkul is a shallow, freshwater lake in Gorno-Badakhshan, in southeast Tajikistan, about 130 km east of the provincial capital of Khorog. Lying in the upper Gunt valley of the Pamir Mountains, it has an area of 3900 ha with a maximum depth of 6 m. Dense vegetation covers much of its surface. It is 1.5 km from a similar lake, Yashilkul, both of which are surrounded by other wetlands as well as sand and pebble plains.

It forms part of the Bulunkul and Yashilkul lakes and mountains Important Bird Area. The lake was stocked with 37,000 gibel carp in 1967.

The village of Bulunkul is known as one of the coldest inhabited places in Central Asia with a record minimum temperature of −63 degrees Celsius.

The lake and village of Bulunkul are featured in a short environmental film by the United Nations University.
