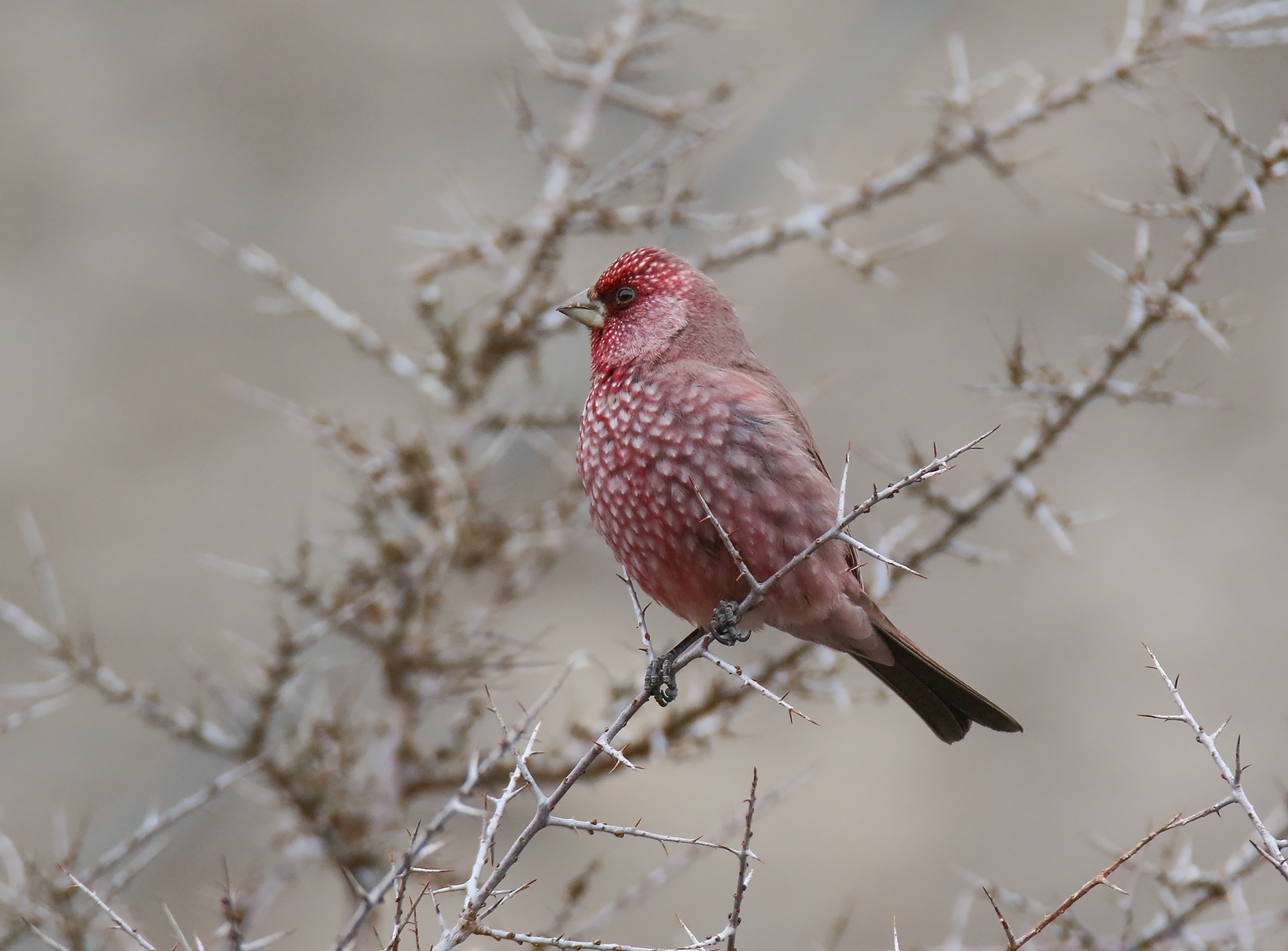
- Male from Borith Lake, Pakistan
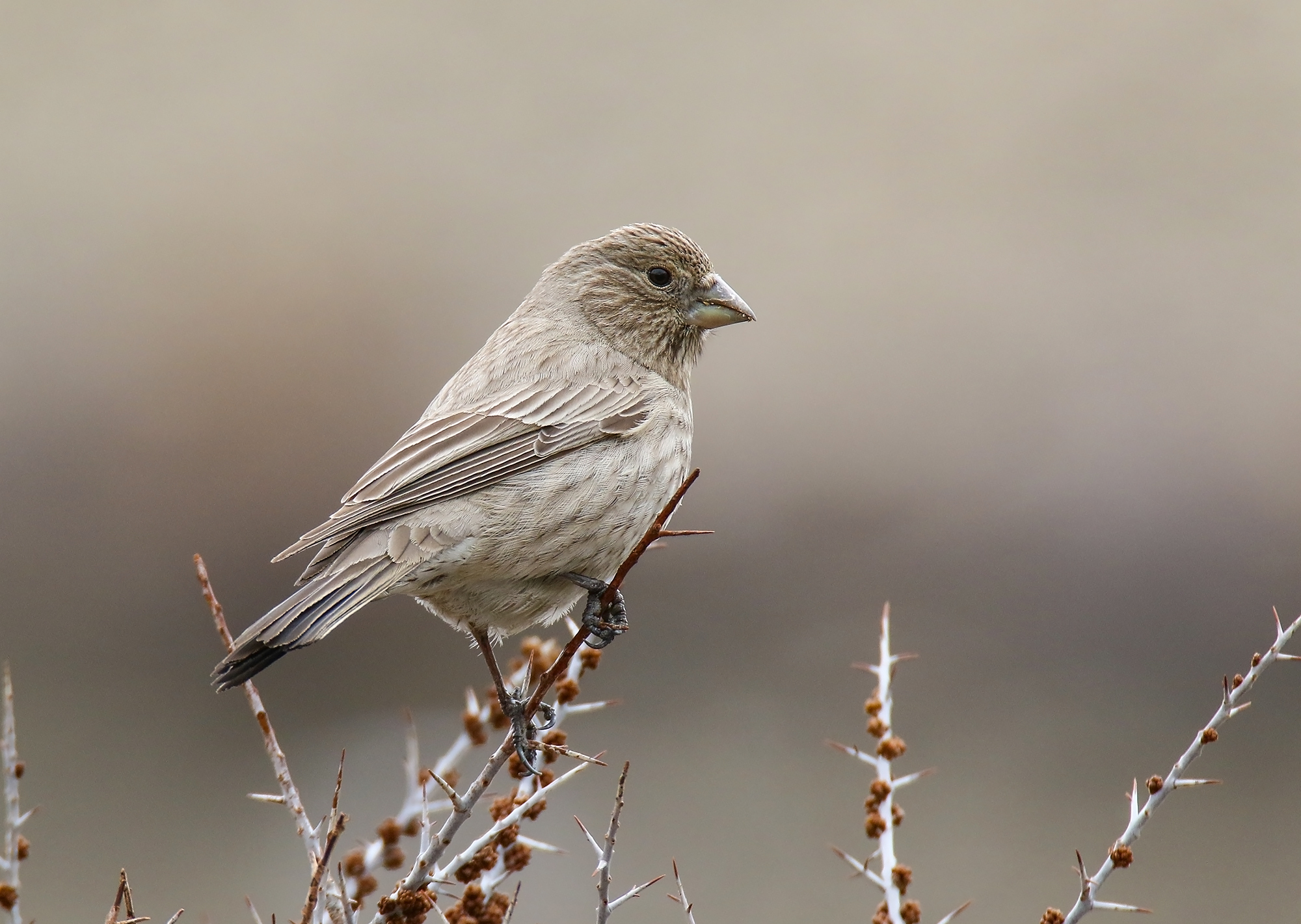
- Female from Borith Lake, Pakistan

Conservation status
- Least Concern (IUCN 3.1)

Scientific classification
- Kingdom: Animalia
- Phylum: Chordata
- Class: Aves
- Order: Passeriformes
- Family: Fringillidae
- Subfamily: Carduelinae
- Genus: Carpodacus
- Species: C. rubicilla

Binomial name
- Carpodacus rubicilla (Güldenstädt, 1775)

Synonyms
- Loxia rubicilla Güldenstädt, 1775; Rubicilla rubicilla (Güldenstädt, 1775); Carpodacus severtzovi Sharpe, 1886

= Great rosefinch =

Species of bird

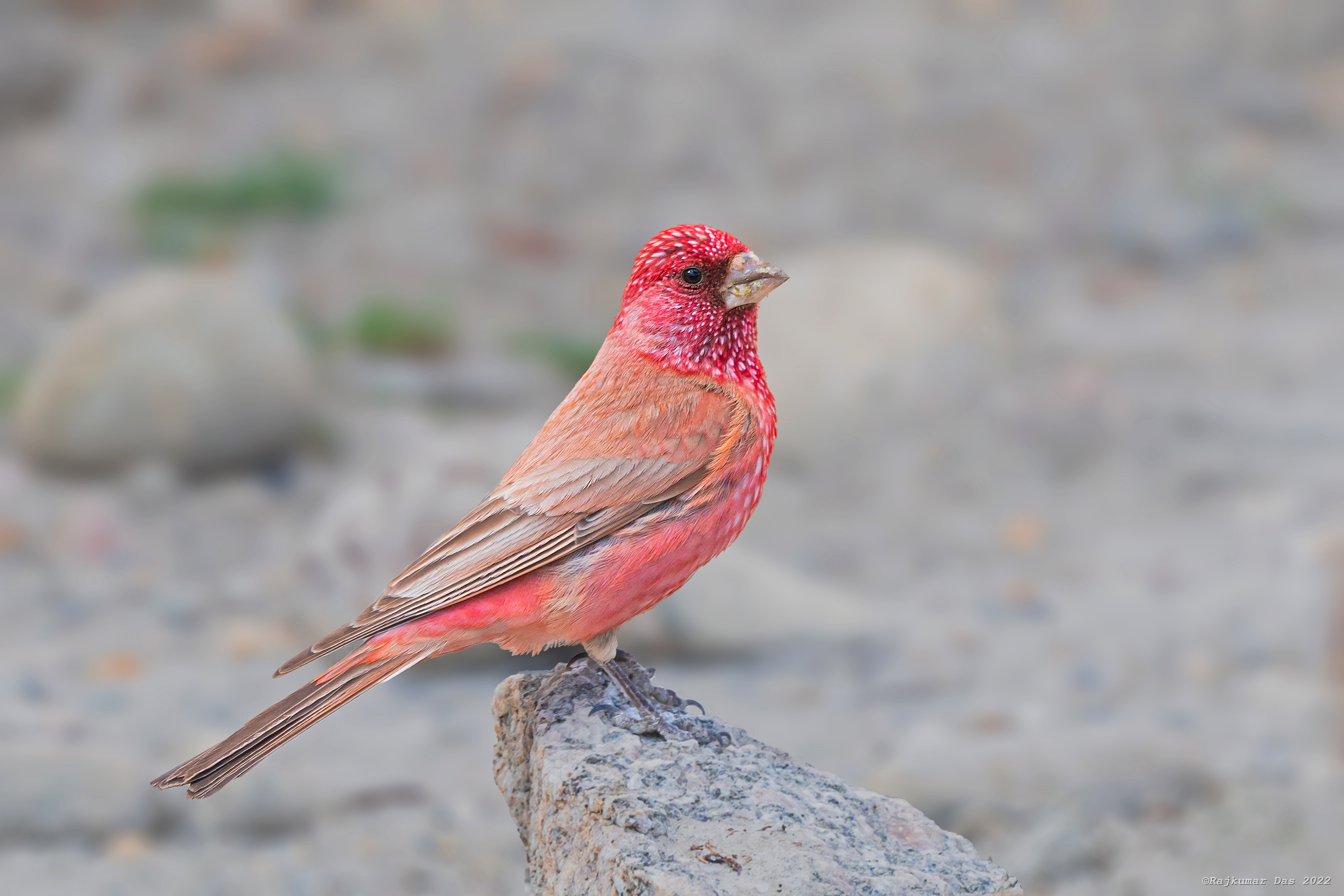
Male in Hanle, Ladakh, India

The great rosefinch (Carpodacus rubicilla) is a species of oscine passerine bird belonging to the family Fringillidae, the finches. This finch is found in the mountains of the Caucasus and Central Asia.

== Taxonomy ==
The great rosefinch was first formally described as Loxia rubicilla in 1775 by the Baltic German naturalist and explorer Johann Anton Güldenstädt with its type locality given as "Caucasus". This species is now classified in the genus Carpodacus, the Palearctic rosefinches, which was proposed in 1829 by Johann Jakob Kaup. This genus is included in the subfamily Carduelinae in the finch family Fringillidae in the suborder Passeri, the songbirds, of the order Passeriformes, the perching birds.

While past taxonomies treated C. r. severtzovi and two other subspecies as a separate species, the spotted great rosefinch (and called the nominate subspecies the "Caucasian great rosefinch"), they are now usually considered subspecies of the great rosefinch.

Four subspecies are recognised:

- C. r. rubicilla (Caucasian great rosefinch) - (Güldenstädt, 1775) - central and eastern Caucasus Mountains
- C. r. diabolicus - (Koelz, 1939) - northeastern Afghanistan and Tajikistan
- C. r. kobdensis - (Sushkin, 1925) - southern Siberia, western Mongolia and northwestern China
- C. r. severtzovi (spotted great rosefinch) - Sharpe, 1886 - eastern Kazakhstan to central China, the Himalayas and northern Pakistan

== Description ==
The great rosefinch is a large rosefinch with a length of 19–20 cm (7.5–7.9 in). The male is red with white or pinkish white spots on the middle of the feathers. The face is a deeper colour than the rest of the body and the wings are brownish. The bill is horn coloured. The females are light grey in colour with brwonish streaks except the rump and lower back are not streaked.

== Distribution and habitat ==
The great rosefinch is found in the Caucasus Mountains in Georgia, Azerbaijan and the far south of Russia, it also occurs over a wide range in the mountains of Central Asia from Mongolia and Siberia south to Pakistan and India, including western China. This species is found in alpine and subalpine areas where there is stunted, sparse vegetation on montane and submontane plateaux, normally above the rhododendron zone, in exposed hillsides, near rock faces and in valleys with sparse dwarf birch, juniper and willow thickets, as well as scree lopes. It can also be found at the edges of glaciers and ice-fields, alpine meadows, and the margins of open fields. They move to similar habitats at lower altitudes with the onset of winter.

== Biology ==
The great rosefinch breeds from late May up to the end of August. The nest is made using thin twigs, plant stalks and roots, frass, moss , hair and feathers and is placed ina crevice on a rock face or in a low bushon a cliff, occasionally in a ruined buiding. The cluch is 4-5 eggs. These finches feeed on seeds, buds and flowers and shoots of alpine plants, with berries and small insects eaten too. Great rosfinches are both residents and altitudinal migrants, descending to lower altitudes from October until March.
