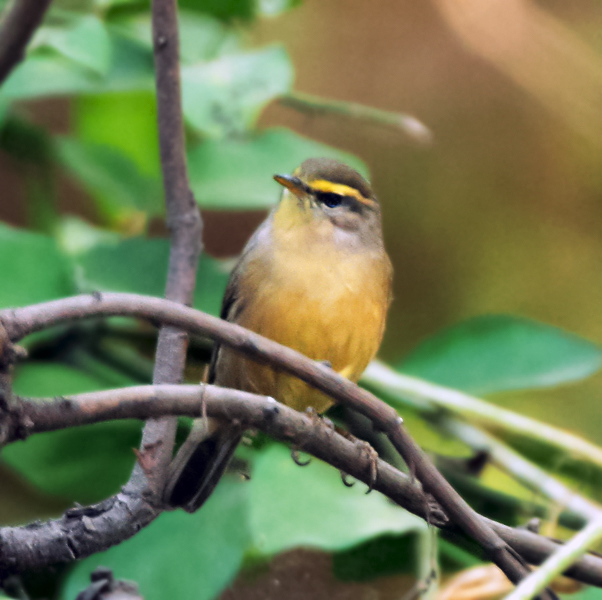
- At Sindhrot in the Vadodara District of Gujarat, India.

Conservation status
- Least Concern (IUCN 3.1)

Scientific classification
- Kingdom: Animalia
- Phylum: Chordata
- Class: Aves
- Order: Passeriformes
- Family: Phylloscopidae
- Genus: Phylloscopus
- Species: P. griseolus

Binomial name
- Phylloscopus griseolus Blyth, 1847

= Sulphur-bellied warbler =

Species of bird

The sulphur-bellied warbler (Phylloscopus griseolus) is a species of leaf-warbler found in the Palearctic region (Afghanistan, Kazakhstan, Kyrgyzstan, Mongolia, Russian Federation [Central Asian Russia], Tajikistan and Turkmenistan). It was earlier also known by the name of olivaceous leaf-warbler.

Like other leaf-warblers, it gleans insects from small branches and leaves. It is found in rocky hill and scrub forest habitats.

The species is found in small groups and has a tendency to forage low in the vegetation, sometimes even hopping on the ground. It has a single note cheep call.

== Gallery ==
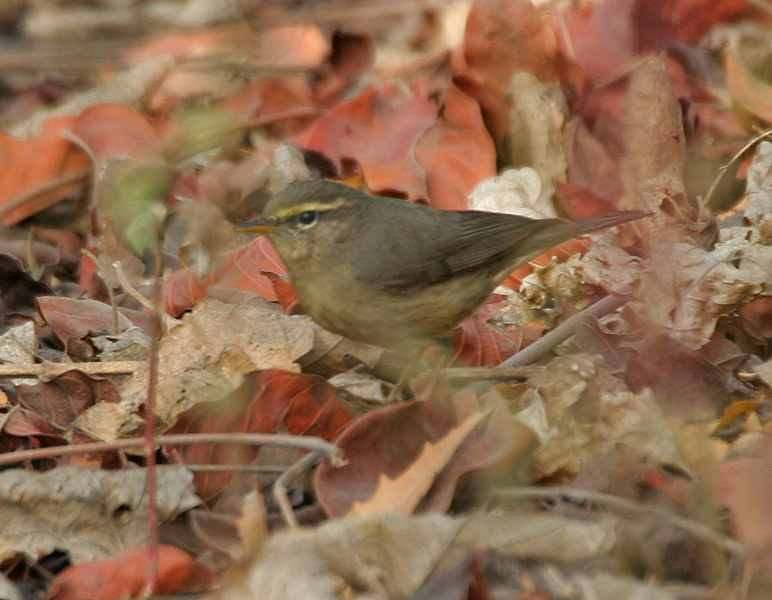
In Hyderabad, India

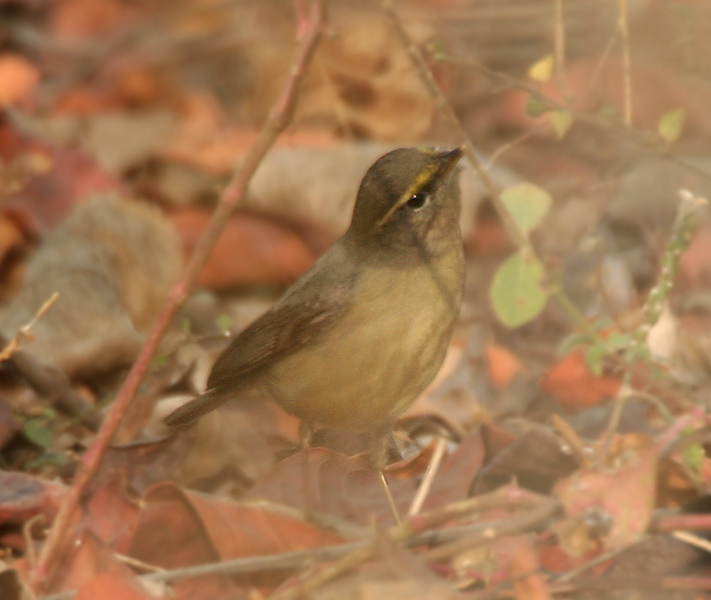
In Hyderabad, India

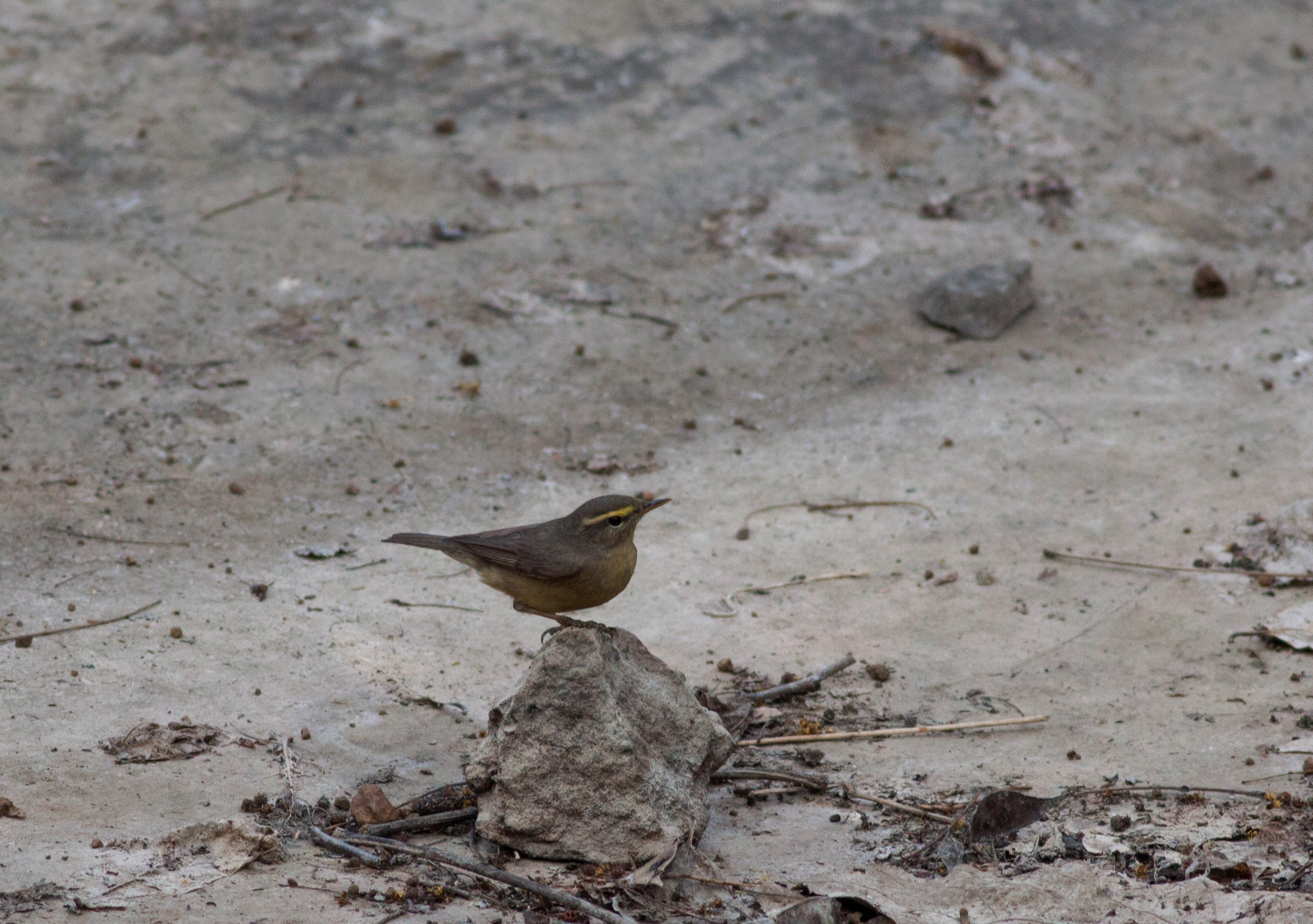
Vasai, Maharashtra, India

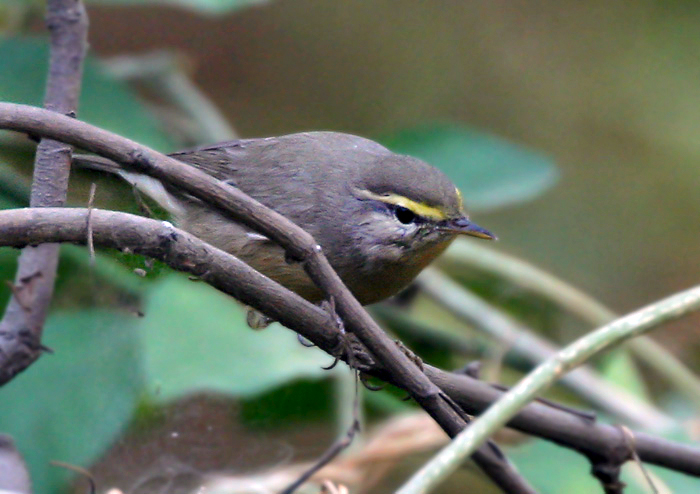
At Sindhrot in Vadodara District of Gujarat, India
