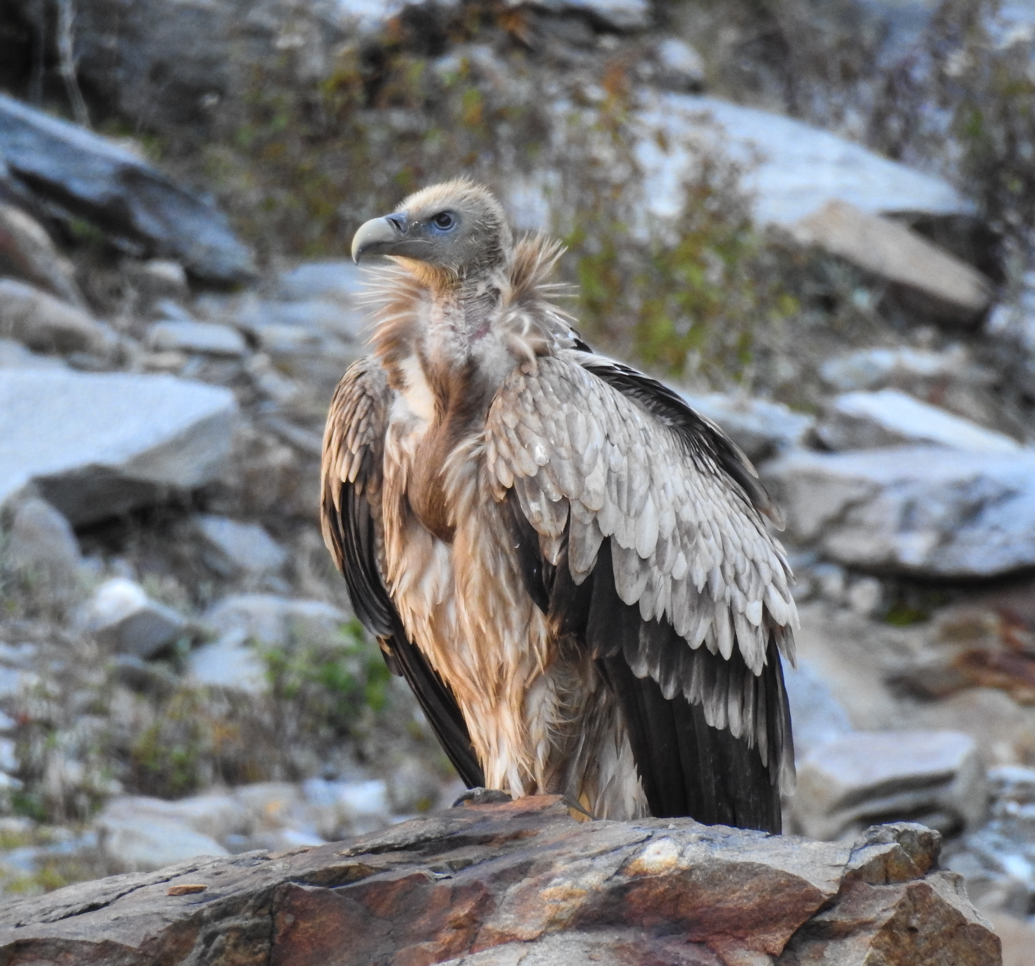

Conservation status
- Near Threatened (IUCN 3.1)

Scientific classification
- Kingdom: Animalia
- Phylum: Chordata
- Class: Aves
- Order: Accipitriformes
- Family: Accipitridae
- Genus: Gyps
- Species: G. himalayensis

Binomial name
- Gyps himalayensis Hume, 1869

= Himalayan vulture =

Species of bird

The Himalayan vulture (Gyps himalayensis) or Himalayan griffon vulture is an Old World vulture native to the Himalayas and foothills in North and Northeastern India, as well as the adjacent Tibetan Plateau. After the cinereous vulture (Aegypius monachus), it is the second-largest Old World vulture species, and among the world's largest true raptors. It is listed as Near Threatened on the IUCN Red List. It is not to be confused with the Eurasian griffon vulture (Gyps fulvus), which is a visually similar, sympatric species.

== Description ==
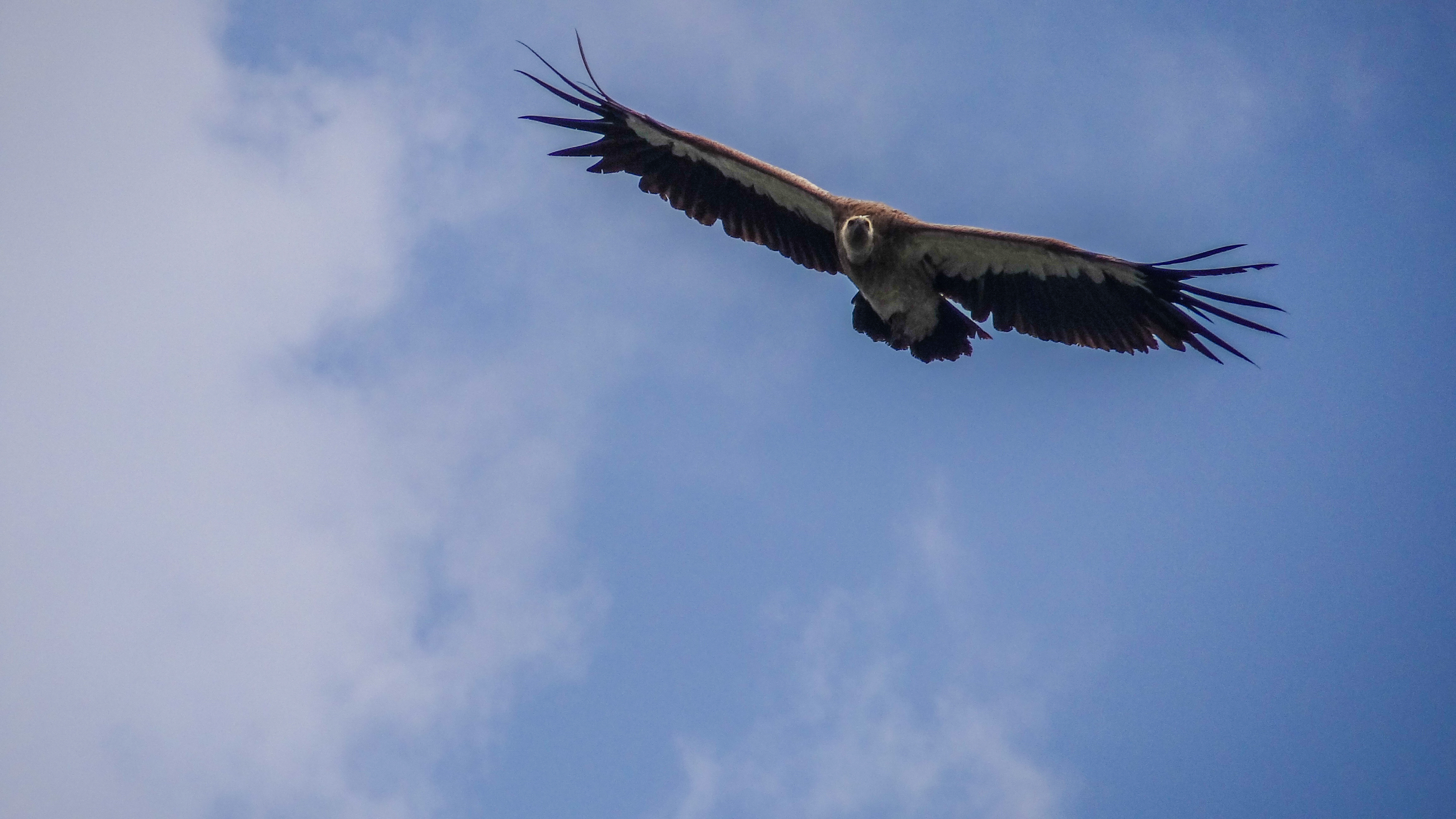
Adult spotted in Dhauladhar range

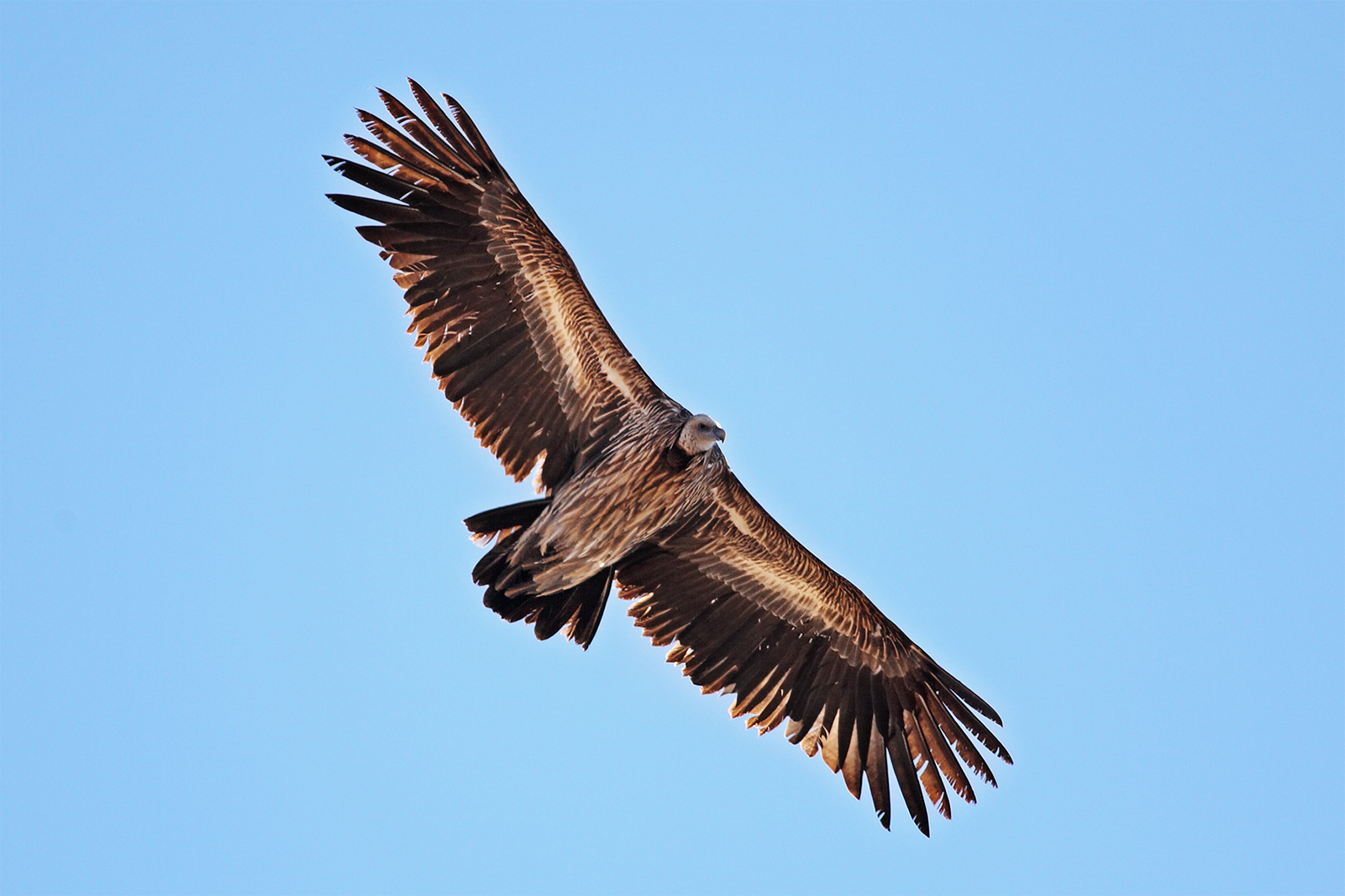
Juvenile in flight

Measurements
Length		1,030–1,150 mm (40.6–45.3 in)
Culmen		71–77 mm (2.8–3.0 in)
Wing		755–805 mm (29.7–31.7 in)
Tail		355–405 mm (14.0–15.9 in)
Tarsus		110–126 mm (4.3–5.0 in)

The Himalayan vulture has dark brown greater covert feathers, tail and wing quills, but a pale buff uniform upperside and paler tipped inner secondaries; its legs are covered with buffy feathers and vary in colour from greenish grey to pale brown. The underside and under-wing coverts are pale brown or buff, almost white in some individuals. The whitish down on the head of immatures changes to yellowish in adults who have a long and pale brown ruff with white streaks and long and spiky ruff feathers.

The pale blue facial skin is lighter than the dark blue in Gyps fulvus with this species having a yellowish bill. In flight the long fingers are splayed and there is a pale patagial stripe on the underwing. The wing and tail feathers are dark and contrast with the pale coverts and body, one of the best methods to distinguish this species from the slightly smaller griffon vulture. The feathers on the body have pale shaft streaks.

It is the largest of the Gyps species, averaging larger in every method of measurement than its relatives, and is perhaps the largest and heaviest bird in the Himalayas. Weight in Himalayan vultures ranges from 6 kg (13 lb) to 12.5 kg (28 lb). It has been estimated to weigh an average of 9 kg (20 lb), but weights vary with conditions from 8–12 kg (18–26 lb). Published measurements of the wingspan vary from 2.56 to 3.1 m (8 ft 5 in to 10 ft 2 in), a similar range to that of cinereous vulture, but the wingspan varies greatly depending on the method used to measure them.

It differs from the similar-coloured Indian vulture (G. indicus) by a stouter, more robust bill; younger birds have a pale bill and tend to have buffy-white streaks on the scapulars and wing coverts contrasting with dark brown underparts. It is similar in size to the cinereous vulture (Aegypius monachus), which typically has a slightly shorter overall length but can weigh more than the Himalayan vulture.

== Distribution ==
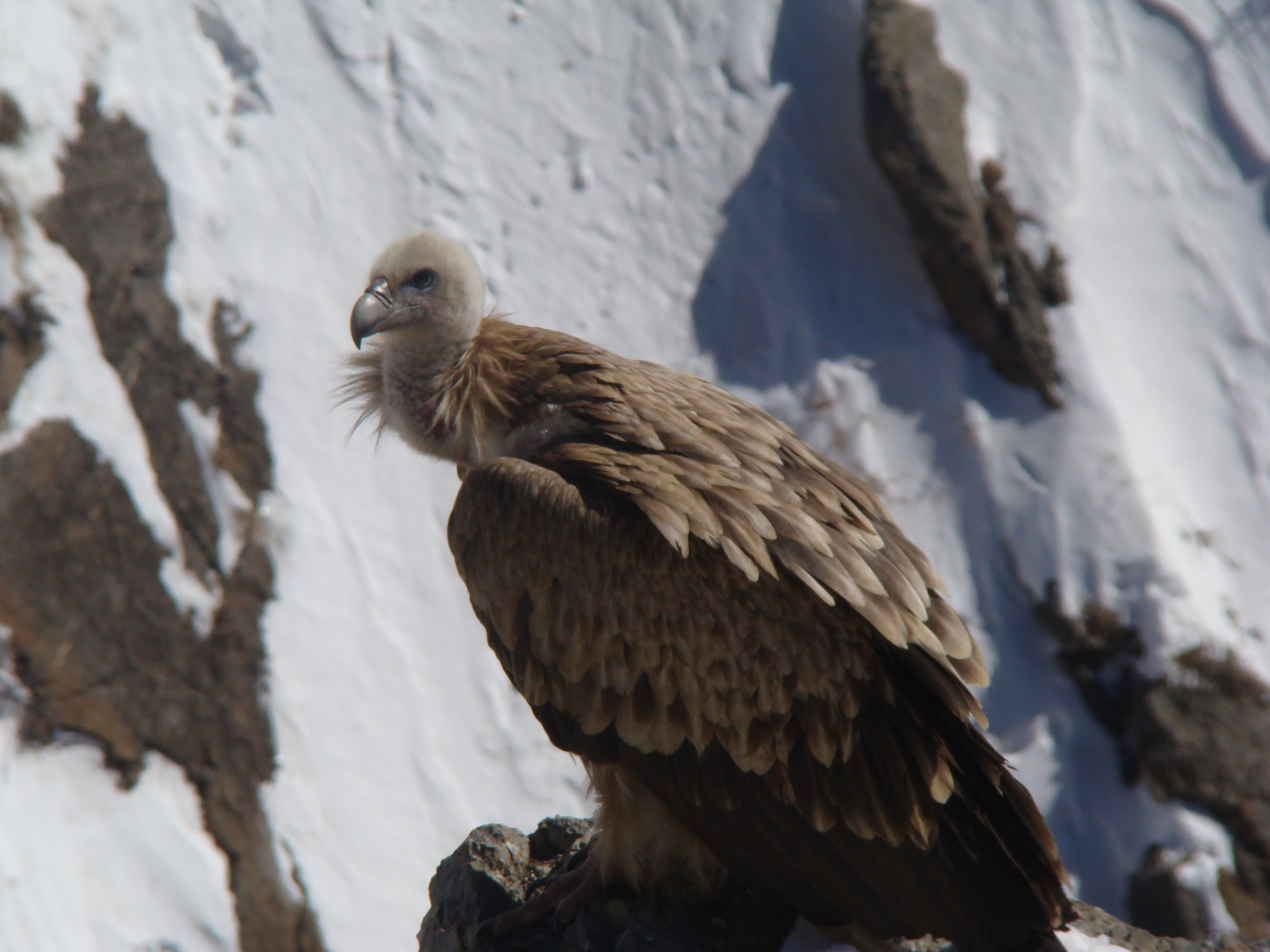
Himalayan griffons in Spiti

The Himalayan vulture lives mainly in the higher regions of the Himalayas and the Tibetan Plateau at the elevation range of 1,200–5,500 m (3,900–18,000 ft). It is distributed from Kazakhstan, Uzbekistan, Kyrgyzstan, Tajikistan, Afghanistan and Iran to Pakistan to India, Nepal, Bhutan to western China and Mongolia. Juvenile birds may however disperse further south, and vagrants have been recorded in Thailand, Burma, Singapore and Cambodia.

== Behaviour and ecology ==
=== Diet ===
The Himalayan vulture perches on crags, favourite sites showing white marks from regular defecation. They tend to not range below an elevation of 1,215 m (3,986 ft). Himalayan vultures often bask in the sun on rocks. They soar in thermals and are not capable of sustained flapping flight. Flocks may follow grazers up the mountains in their search for dead animals. This vulture makes a rattling sound when descending on a carcass and can grunt or hiss at roosts or when feeding on carrion. While feeding, individuals may make cackling sounds to defend their food from other vultures or even reprimand them. They are social birds, and are hence found in large flocks, while even being accompanied by crows (observed with other vulture species as well). Such crows cannot interfere with the flocks (as vultures are physically larger and stronger than crows), but vehicular traffic, human interference, and attacks from herding dogs can pose a disturbance.

They have been recorded eating carrion exclusively, some which is fed on even when putrid. On the Tibetan Plateau, it was noted that 64% of their diet was obtained from deceased domestic yak (Bos grunniens). The birds fed on old carcasses, sometimes even waiting for several days near a dead animal. However, each vulture species has a specialty diet: Himalayan vultures largely disdain offal (which is readily eaten by other vulture species), typically eating only fleshy tissue. Historically, Himalayan vultures regularly fed on human corpses left out on Celestial burial grounds.

The Himalayan vulture is fairly defensive around other scavengers, such as foxes or smaller felines, and typically dominates other meat-eaters at carcasses, though it is subservient to gray wolves (Canis lupus), snow leopards (Panthera uncia) and cinereous vultures (Aegypius monachus). In a large party, these vultures can reportedly strip a carcass of all tissue in 30 minutes, and do the same to a yak carcass in roughly 120 minutes. Himalayan vultures have been observed feeding on pine (Pinus roxburghii) needles, an unexplained behaviour that cannot be for obtaining nutrition, but may be done to access essential oils and terpenes in the needles for digestive or immunity benefits.

=== Breeding ===
The breeding season begins in January. The nest is a platform of sticks placed on an inaccessible ledge on a cliff. Nest in northeastern India have been recorded at between 1,215 and 1,820 m (3,986 and 5,971 ft) in elevation, but those in Tibet have been as high as 4,245 m (13,927 ft). Several pairs may nest on the same cliff face, with between five and seven pairs being a typical colony size. The nests are relatively small for the large size of these birds and, although grow larger with repeated uses, do not generally get as massive as the nest of other large accipitrids. There is at least one recorded instance of Himalayan vultures using a nest made by bearded vultures (Gypaetus barbatus). On the Tibetan Plateau, Himalayan and bearded vultures were observed nesting in close proximity without conflict, which is notable because in several other cases of adjacent interspecies nesting by Old World vultures (including some involving bearded vultures) have resulted in high aggression and interspecies attacks. A single white egg marked with red splotches is the usual clutch. Egg laying dates in northern India have ranged from December 25 to March 7. The egg is coarse and oval and can measure from 87 to 103.6 mm (3.43 to 4.08 in) in height and 65 to 74 mm (2.6 to 2.9 in) in width, with an average of 94.8 by 70.1 mm (3.73 by 2.76 in). In captivity the incubation period was about 54–58 days. The young birds stay on with the parents for six to seven months.

== Threats ==
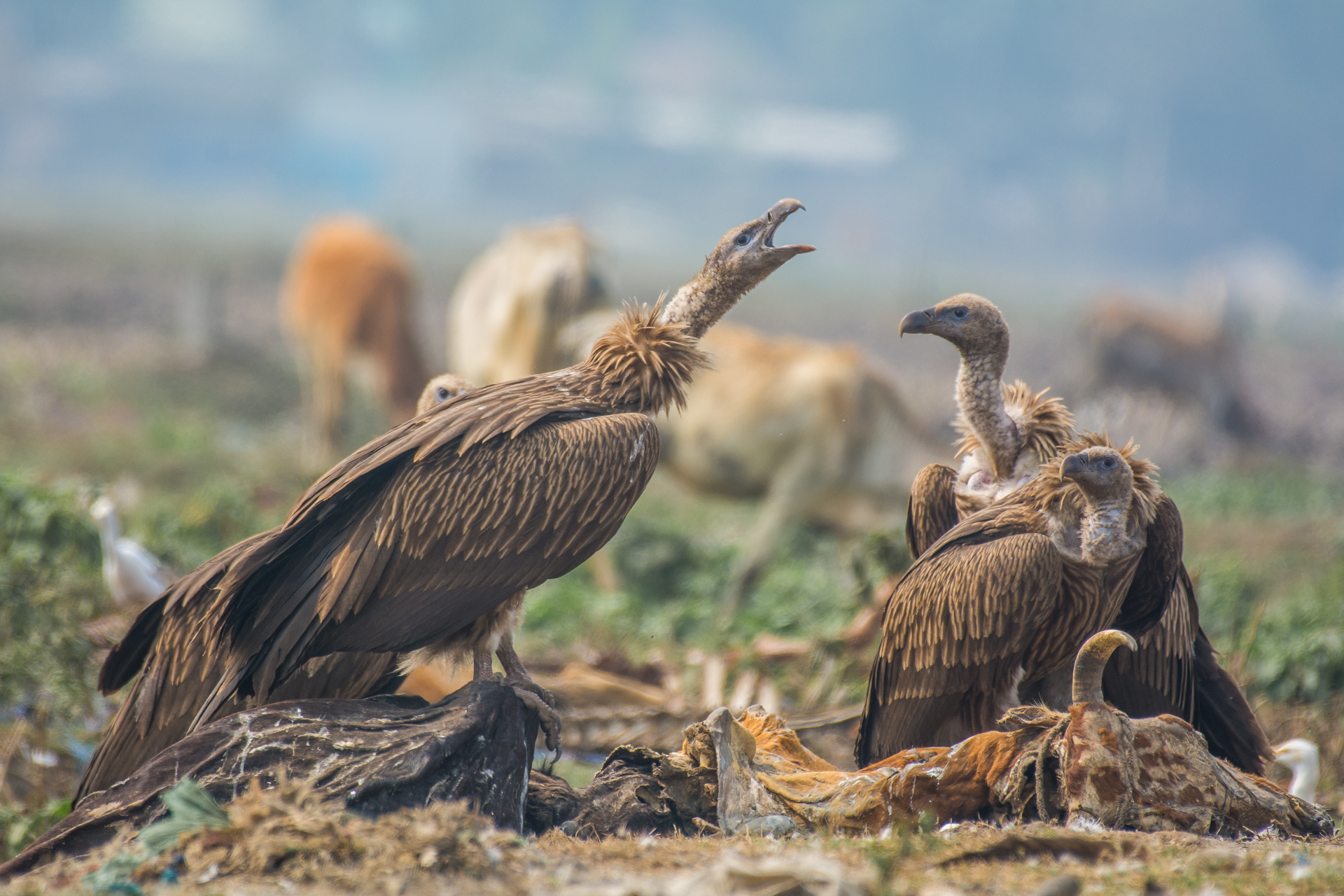
Himalayan vultures in Jalpaiguri, West Bengal

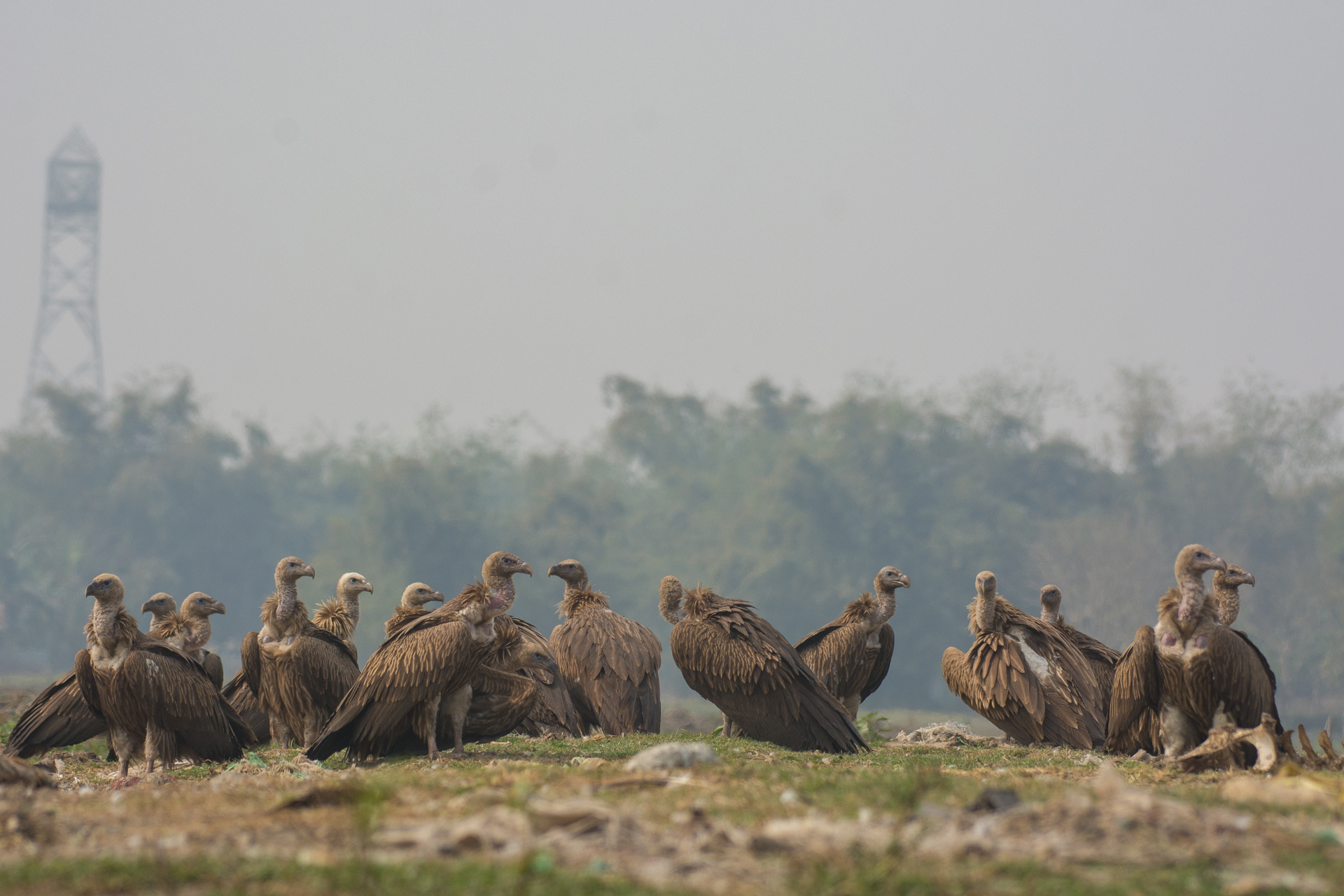
Himalayan griffon near Jalpaiguri

Himalayan vultures are susceptible to toxicity induced by diclofenac, a drug whose residues in domestic animal carcasses has led to rapid declines in populations of other Gyps vultures across Asia. The Himalayan griffon vulture populations have however not shown signs of rapid decline, although reductions in nesting birds have been noted in some parts of its range in Nepal.
