= Hawa Hawa =

Song by Hasan Jahangir

from the album Hawa Hawa
- Language: Urdu
- Released: 1987
- Genre: pop
- Songwriter: Rehan Azmi
- Composer: Hasan Jahangir

"Hawa Hawa" is a 1987 Urdu song sung by Pakistani pop singer Hasan Jahangir.

== Composition ==
"Hawa Hawa" was recorded in 1986, and released in 1987. The tune of the song is based on the 1970s Persian song "Havar Havar" by Kourosh Yaghmaei. The song starts with the line "Hawa Hawa Ai Hawa Khushbu Loota De" ("Air, oh Air, Swell the fragrance").

According to Jahangir, the beats of the song "are extremely catchy and would appeal to people from diverse cultures and musical traditions. Even when you can't understand the language, you can appreciate the beats and the rhythm".

== Reception ==
The song became immensely popular throughout South Asia, particularly in India, Pakistan, and Bangladesh. Jahangir's album by the same name also became in India, and the song frequently played on radio in the country. The song was frequently remade in Bollywood films; sometimes with the same lyrics and music and sometime with the same music, but with different lyrics. Jahangir's version was used in the 1994 movie Insaaf Apne Lahoo Se.

Shortly after the release of "Hawa Hawa", the tune of the song was unofficially used in "Jawan Jawan Ishq Jawan", a song from 1989 Govinda-starrer Billoo Badshah. It was sung by Govinda himself. The song "Aaya Aaya Pyar Aaya" in the 1989 Hindi film Aag Ka Gola was adapted from "Hawa Hawa". It was composed by Bappi Lahiri, and it featured Archana Puran Singh, Sunny Deol, and Prem Chopra dancing on the song.

In 2017, the makers of the Hindi film Mubarakan (2017) released a new version of this song as promotional single of their film, which was written with different lyrics while keeping "Hawa Hawa" hookline same. The version was sung by Mika Singh, featuring Arjun Kapoor and Ileana D'Cruz dancing on the song. Devarsi Ghosh, writing for Scroll.in, called the remake "forgettable" and describing the original version as an earworm which 'doesn't need a remake'. The remake version of the song also featured in the 2012 Hindi film Chaalis Chauraasi. The Bengali version of "Hawa Hawa" also appeared in the Bangladeshi song "Khala Khala". The original song plays during Sanjay Dutt's entry scene in 2025 Hindi film Dhurandhar.
