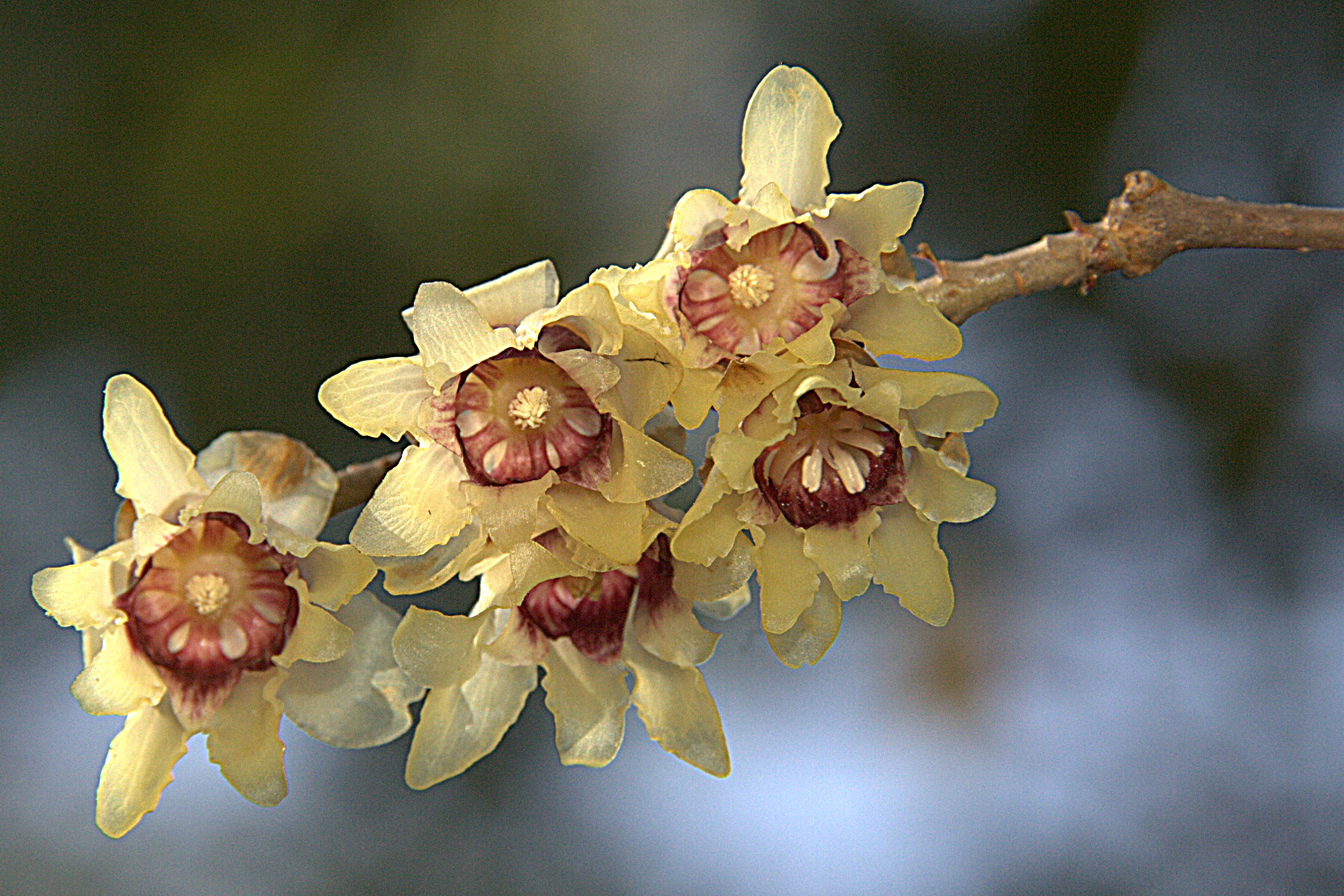
- Winter flowers on leafless stems

Scientific classification
- Kingdom: Plantae
- Clade: Tracheophytes
- Clade: Angiosperms
- Clade: Magnoliids
- Order: Laurales
- Family: Calycanthaceae
- Genus: Chimonanthus
- Species: C. praecox

Binomial name
- Chimonanthus praecox (L.) Link

Synonyms
- List: Beureria praecox (L.) Kuntze; Calycanthus praecox L.; Calycanthus suaveolens Salisb.; Chimonanthus caespitosus T.B.Chao, Z.X.Chen & Z.Q.Li; Chimonanthus fragrans (Loisel.) Lindl.; Chimonanthus grandiflorus (Lindl.) Steud.; Chimonanthus luteus (G.Don) Biel.; Chimonanthus parviflorus Raf.; Chimonanthus verus Biel.; Chimonanthus yunnanensis W.W.Sm.; Meratia fragrans Loisel.; Meratia praecox (L.) Rehder & E.H.Wilson; Meratia yunnanensis (W.W.Sm.) Hu

= Chimonanthus praecox =

Species of flowering plant

Chimonanthus praecox, also known as wintersweet and Japanese allspice, is a species of flowering plant in the genus Chimonanthus of the family Calycanthaceae. The plant is native to China and is known as làméi (蠟梅) in Chinese. It is also grown in Iran, where it is called gol-e yakh (گل‌یخ) or "ice flower" in Persian.

The plant is a vigorous deciduous shrub growing to 4 m (13 ft) tall with an erect trunk and leaves 5–29 cm (2–11 in) long and 2–12 cm (1–5 in) broad. Its strongly scented pendent flowers, produced in winter (between November and March in UK,) on bare stems, have 15-21 yellow or pale green-yellow tepals, the inner ones usually with purplish red pigments.

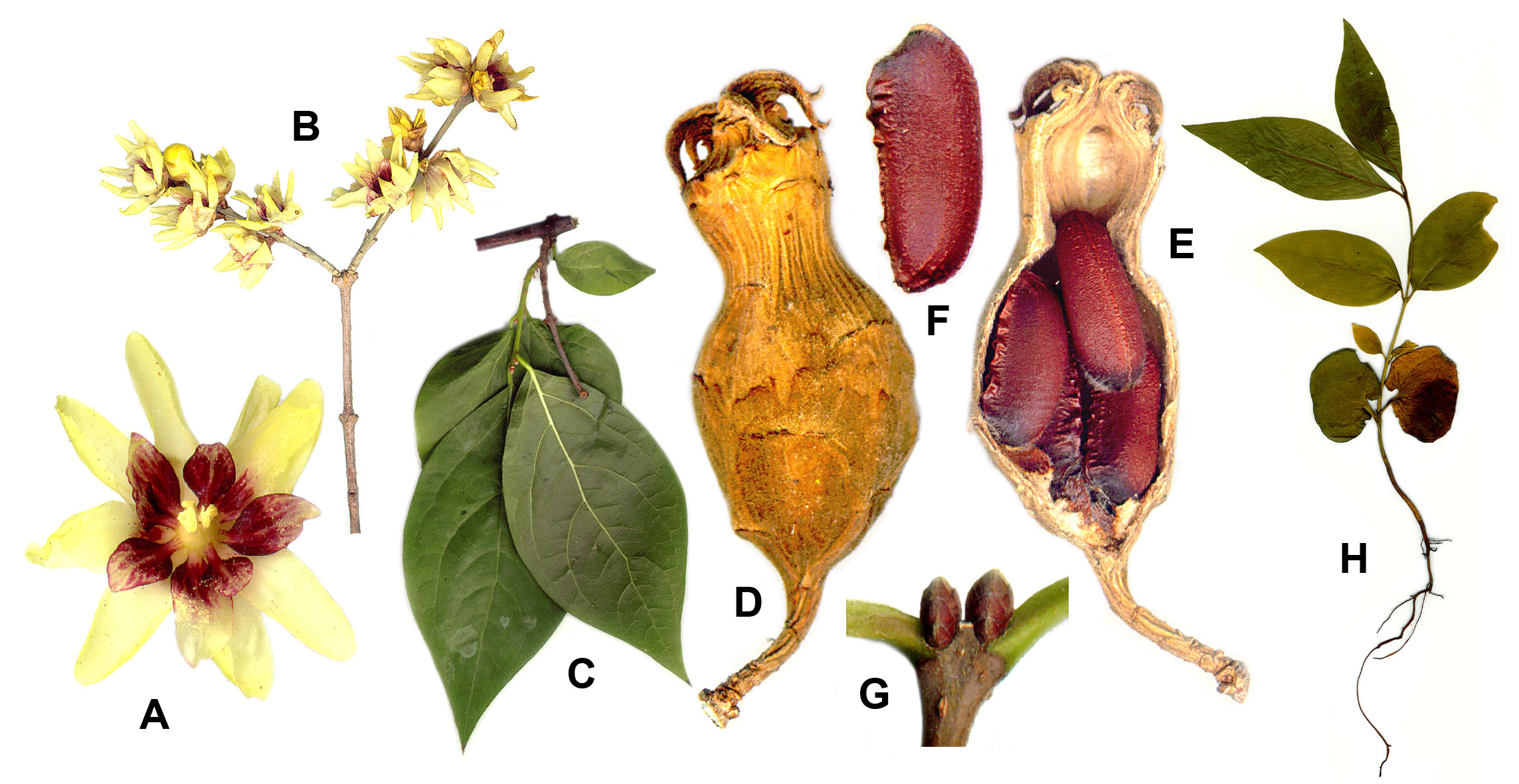
A&B: flowers; C: foliage; D: hypanthium; E: longitudinal section of hypanthium; F: fruit; G: terminal leaf buds; H: seedling

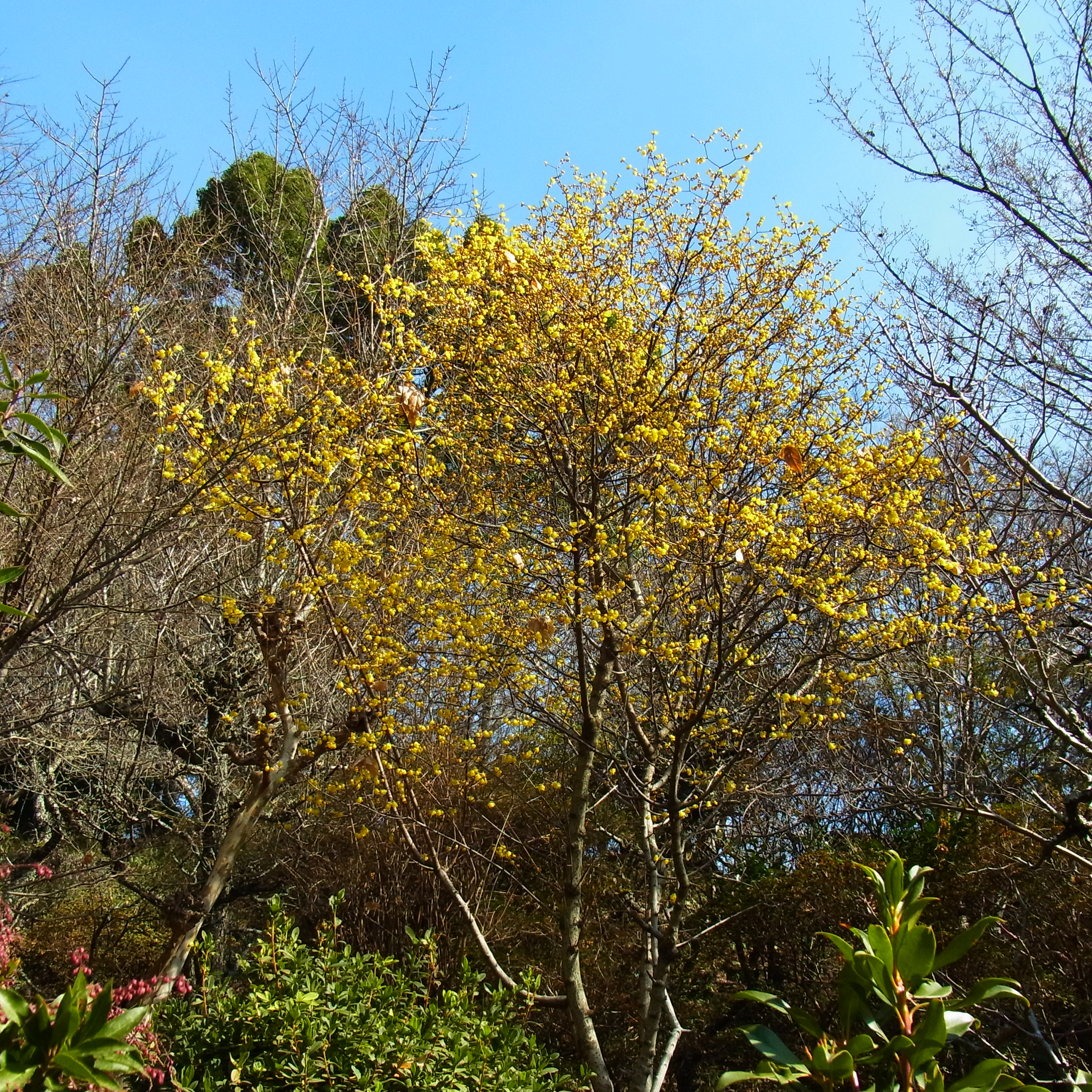
Winter flowering

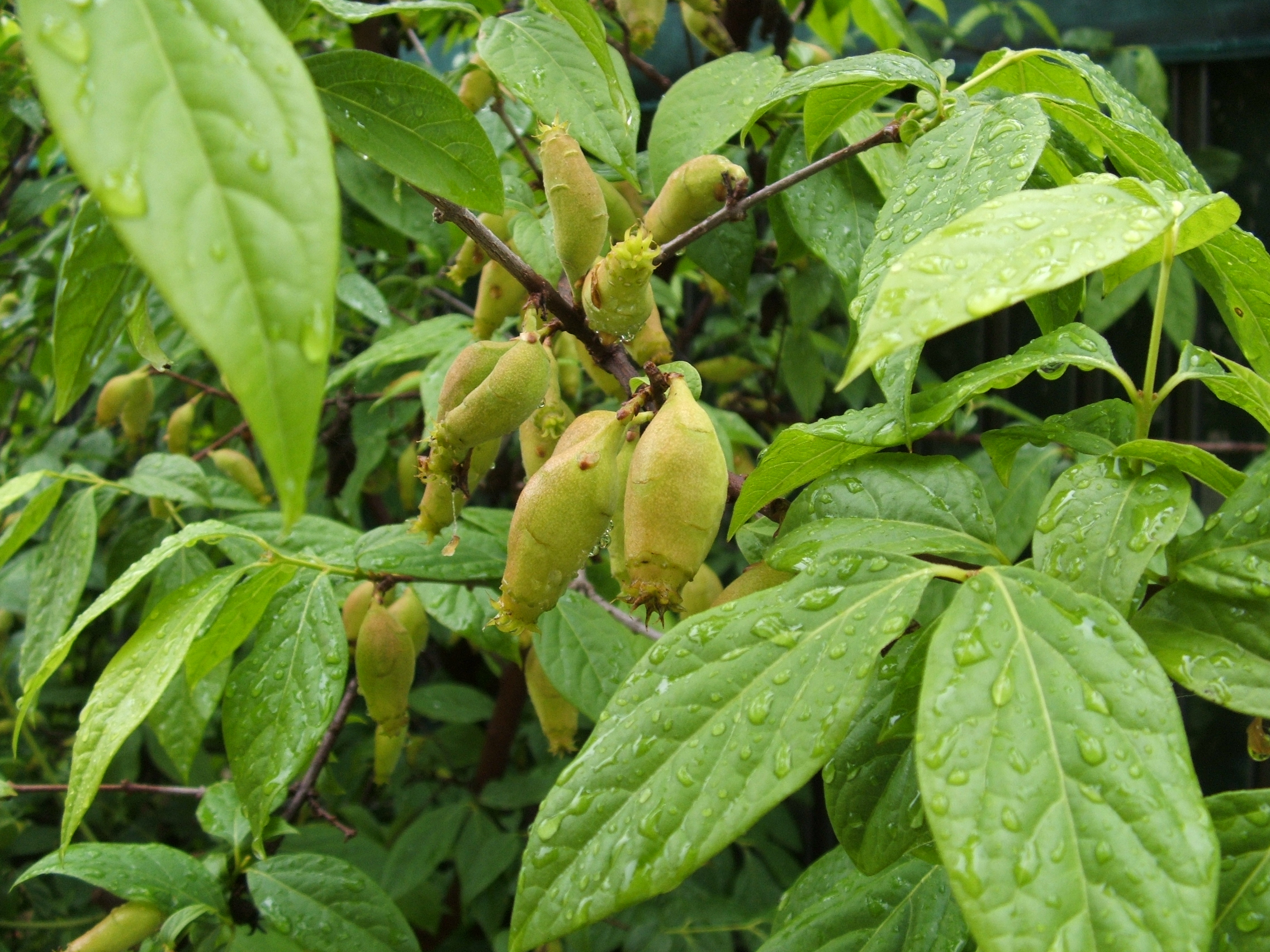
Leaves and fruit

This plant is cultivated in gardens, producing valued flower colour during dormant seasons. The cultivars C. praecox 'Grandiflorus' and C. praecox 'Luteus' have gained the Royal Horticultural Society's Award of Garden Merit.

The plant is not closely related to allspice, Pimenta dioica.

== Cultural use ==
C. praecox is a common motif in traditional Persian poetry, literature, and music. A more modern example of C. praecox in Persian music is Kourosh Yaghmaei's Gol-e Yakh.
