= Thunder Soul =

- Poster
- Directed by: Mark Landsman
- Produced by: Mark Landsman; Jessica Wu; Keith Calder
- Starring: Conrad Johnson
- Narrated by: Jamie Foxx
- Edited by: Claire Didier
- Music by: David Torn (uncredited)
- Production company: Snoot Entertainment
- Distributed by: Roadside Attractions
- Release dates: March 13, 2010 (SXSW); September 23, 2011
- Running time: 88 minutes
- Country: United States
- Language: English
- Box office: $143,986

Thunder Soul is a 2010 American documentary film produced and directed by Mark Landsman. The film features narration by Jamie Foxx and stars Conrad Johnson. The film premiered at South by Southwest in 2010.

== Synopsis ==
A former Kashmere High School graduate returns home after 35 years to play a tribute concert for his beloved band leader, who, during the 1970s, turned the struggling jazz band, Kashmere Stage Band, into a world-class funk powerhouse.

== Reception ==
On review aggregator website Rotten Tomatoes, the film has a 100% approval rating based on 29 reviews. On Metacritic, the film has a weighted average score of 81 out of a 100 based on 24 reviews, indicating "universal acclaim".

Joe Leydon of Variety wrote "Thunder Soul offers a heaping helping of uplift".

Marjorie Baumgarten of The Austin Chronicle wrote "[The film] tells the story of the Kashmere Stage Band, and before the film is through, this high school band you've never heard of will have earned a top spot on your personal hit parade". According to Sheri Linden of the Los Angeles Times, "Though [the film] sometimes overplays the sentimentality, [it] gets not just the music but also the sense of possibility for this post-civil-rights generation".

Nathan Rabin of The A.V. Club criticized the filmmakers for not being "interested in peering beneath the dazzling surface". According to him, despite portraying Johnson as a "benign dictator", "[the film] represents a feast for the senses, a soulful celebration of the black musical renaissance of the late '60s and '70s". Kirk Honeycutt of The Hollywood Reporter called Thunder Soul "[a] genuinely moving and powerful doc[umentary] about one of the great funk bands ever, that just happened to be a high school band".
