= Texas Thunder Soul 1968–1974 =

Compilation album by Kashmere Stage Band
- Released: 2006
- Recorded: 1968–1974

Texas Thunder Soul 1968–1974 is a two-disc compilation album of recordings by the Kashmere Stage Band, released on Now-Again Records in 2006. The first disc contains studio recordings by the group, including energetic cover versions of "Theme from Shaft", "Super Bad", "Scorpio" and "Burning Spear". The second disc features unreleased live recordings and alternate takes, and includes a 12-minute video documentary about the group, Texas Jewels. The album includes a 40-page booklet filled with photos, interviews and ephemera.

== Track listing ==
Disc one

1. "Boss City"
2. "Burning Spear"
3. "Take Five"
4. "Super Bad"
5. "Keep Doing It"
6. "Thunder Soul"
7. "Do You Dig It, Man?"
8. "Headwiggle"
9. "Do Your Thing" **
10. "Scorpio" **
11. "Thank You" **
12. "Al's Tune"
13. "All Praises"
14. "Shaft"
15. "Kashmere"
16. "$$ Kash Register $$"
17. "Zero Point" – parts 1 & 2 (45 version) *
18. "Getting It Out of My System"

Disc two

Live recordings (all previously unreleased):

1. "Intro"
2. "Zero Point"
3. "All Praises" / "Zero Point" (Reprise)
4. "Intro"
5. "Do You Dig It, Man?"
6. "Don't Mean a Thing"
7. "Thank You"
8. "Ain't No Sunshine"
9. "Do You Dig It, Man?"
10. "All Praises"

Alternate takes

1. "Thank You" (45 version)
2. "Zero Point" (LP version)
3. "Do Your Thing" (instrumental)
4. "Getting It Out of My System" *

Bonus documentary
Texas Jewels

* previously unreleased
** previously unissued extended version

== Credits ==
=== Musicians ===
- Ricky Adams – Saxophone
- Arthur Armstrong – Saxophone
- Frank Bell – Drums
- Johnny Brown – Saxophone
- Gerald Calhoun – Bass
- Andrei Carriere – Guitar
- Paul Chevalier – Guitar
- Rev. James Cleveland – Trombone
- Dorothy Compton – Percussion
- Lionel Cormier and the Sundown P – Saxophone
- Gerald Curvey – Drums
- Patricia Davis – Lead
- Ronnie Davis – Trumpet
- Michael Dogan – Bass
- Timothy Dunham – Saxophone
- Lawrence Foster – Trombone
- Samuel Frazier – Trumpet, Tambourine
- Grady Gaines Douglas – Sax (Alto)
- Roy Garcia – Guitar
- Craig Green – Bass, Drums
- Morris 'Sonny' Hall – Conga
- Dwight Harris – Trombone
- Ray Harris – Drums
- James "Ham" Jackson – Saxophone
- Leo Jackson – Trumpet
- Michael "Mike Dee" Johnson – Trumpet
- Audrey Jones – Trumpet
- Jesse Jones, Jr. – Saxophone
- Samuel Jones – Trombone
- Sheila Jordan – Soprano (Vocal)
- Hilton Joseph – Saxophone, Sax (Tenor)
- Johnny Lewis – Drums
- Henry Marks – Drums
- Thaddeus McGowen – Saxophone
- Bruce Middleton – Flute, Saxophone, Sax (Tenor)
- George Miller – Saxophone, Tenor (Vocal)
- Diane Moore – French Horn
- Harold Morris – Saxophone
- Cloyce Muckelroy – Trumpet
- Alva Nelson – Organ, Saxophone, Fender Rhodes
- Glennie Odoms – Saxophone
- Larry Phillips – Saxophone
- Shirley Ploucha – French Horn
- Leon Polk – Trumpet
- Johnny Reason – Guitar
- Sherman Robertson – Guitar, Tambourine
- Earl Spiller – Guitar
- Byron Starling – Trombone
- Roy Taylor – Saxophone
- John C. Thomas – Trumpet
- Wilmon Toran – Saxophone
- Clyde Walker – Saxophone, Baritone (Vocal)
- Jimmie "J.J." Walker – Trombone
- Bruce White – Saxophone
- Elray Wiseman – Trumpet
- Byron Wooten – Trumpet
- Henry Robinson – Drums
- Naomi James – Piano
- Linda Wiseman – Percussion
- Katherine Lambert – Percussion
- Elmer Glover – Bongos
- Jackie Gray – Drums

=== Technical and art ===
- Eothen Alapatt – Transfers, Compilation Producer, Research, Annotation
- Dave Cooley – Mastering, Restoration
- Kelly Hibbert – Mastering, Restoration
- Bill Holford – Engineer
- Claude Robinson – Transfers
- Matt Rowlands – Art Direction
