= Back from the Brink =

Back from the Brink may refer to:

- Back from the Brink: Pre-Revolution Psychedelic Rock from Iran: 1973–1979, a 2011 album by Kourosh Yaghmaei
- Back from the Brink, a 1983 book by Michael Edwardes
- Back from the Brink, a 2006 autobiography by Paul McGrath
- Back from the Brink: 1,000 Days at Number 11, a 2011 book by Alistair Darling
- Back from the Brink, a rare-species conservation programme of Plantlife
