= Malek Jamshid =

Studio album by Kourosh Yaghmaei
- Released: June 10, 2016
- Genre: Psychedelic rock
- Length: 44:37
- Label: Now-Again
- Producer: Kourosh Yaghmaei

Kourosh Yaghmaei chronology
Tofang-e daste Noghre (2001)	Malek Jamshid (2016)	Rebel (2024)

Malek Jamshid (Persian: ملک جمشید, "King Jamshid") is the twelfth studio album by Iranian singer-songwriter and guitarist Kourosh Yaghmaei. The album was released on June 10, 2016 by Now-Again Records in the United States after it was banned in Iran. The title refers to the legendary king Jamshid from the Shahnameh.

== Recording and released ==
The album was recorded between 2003 and 2006. There had been restrictions on his music in the Islamic Republic. His album was disputed by the Ministry of Culture and Islamic Guidance. In 2016, Malek Jamshid became available outside Iran by Now-Again Records.

== Track listing ==
All music is composed by Kourosh Yaghmaei

Side one
No.	Title	English title	Length
1.	"Key To Miaei?"	When Do You Come?	03:20
2.	"Harfaye Abi"	The Blue Words	05:41
3.	"Ghatar"	Train	05:44
4.	"Chamedoon"	Suitcase	03:09
5.	"Poshte Oun Dar"	Behind That Door	03:48
6.	"Panahandeh"	Refugee	04:58
7.	"Nowruz"	Iranian New Year	04:43
8.	"Safar"	Journey	05:41
9.	"Malek Jamshid"	King Jamshid	07:33
