= Wells Fargo (band) =

Zimbabwean rock band

- Origin: Bulawayo, Zimbabwe (then: Rhodesia)
- Genres: psychedelic rock, Zim heavy
- Years active: 1973–1989
- Labels: Afro Soul, Now-Again Records
- Past members: Ebba Chitambo; Handsome Mabhiza; Never Mpofu; Josi Ndlovu; Virginia Phiri

Wells Fargo were a psychedelic rock band based in Bulawayo, Zimbabwe.

== History ==
Guitarist Josi Ndlovu and drummer Ebba Chitambo first met in 1969 when Ndlovu spotted Chitambo playing for a local band called Springfields. Although Chitambo had never drummed before, Ndlovu was impressed by his performance, and invited him to play with him in a band called The Movers (later: The Moove). Inspired by the music of Jimi Hendrix, Chitambo decided to start a band called Wells Fargo, and invited Ndlovu to join. The lineup was completed by jazz musician Handsome Mabhiza as guitarist and Chitambo's neighbour, young bassist Never Mpofu. The band was named based on an image in a comic book, without awareness of the existence of the bank with the same name.

Wells Fargo's music was initially apolitical. However, this did not last long as the authorities viewed them with suspicion: their concerts brought white and black people together, which was seen as a threat to the segregationist rule in Rhodesia. The Rhodesian Bush War also helped push the band towards a more political direction. This political direction culminated in their first hit song, initially called "Have Gun – Will Travel". Ndlovu and Chitambo have been working on the song since 1972, before the band was even founded. The song became a pro-democracy anthem for many Zimbabweans, which got them in trouble with the local authorities in various occasions. In particular, lyrics such as "Watch out, freedom is coming" resulted in the song getting banned from radio, as well as police raids at the band's shows. Because of this, they later changed the lyric to "Watch out, a big storm is coming" for the official recording, released in 1977 under a different title ("Watch Out"). The song sold about 15 thousand copies.

Wells Fargo dissolved in 1989, with the members remaining involved in their own separate music projects. The band's guitarist Handsome Mabhiza died in 2013, aged 61.

In 2016, a compilation of the band's 1976–1977 singles called Watch Out! was released by Now-Again Records, marking the first ever Wells Fargo album released outside of Zimbabwe, as well as their first release in the LP format.

== Musical style ==
Wells Fargo played "heavy rock" or "Zim heavy", a genre of music played in Zimbabwean townships. Their music was heavily inspired by the likes of Jimi Hendrix. The band have also named Black Sabbath, Deep Purple, The Who and Ten Years After among their influences.

== Discography ==
Compilations

- Watch Out! (2016)

Singles

- "Coming Home", "Carrying On" and "Too Long Away" (1976)
- "Shades of Wells Fargo" and "Bwanawe" (1976)
- "Bump Bump Babe" and "The Crowd" (1977)
- "Watch Out" and "Love My Life" (1977)
- "Love Is The In Thing" and "Open The Door" (1977)
