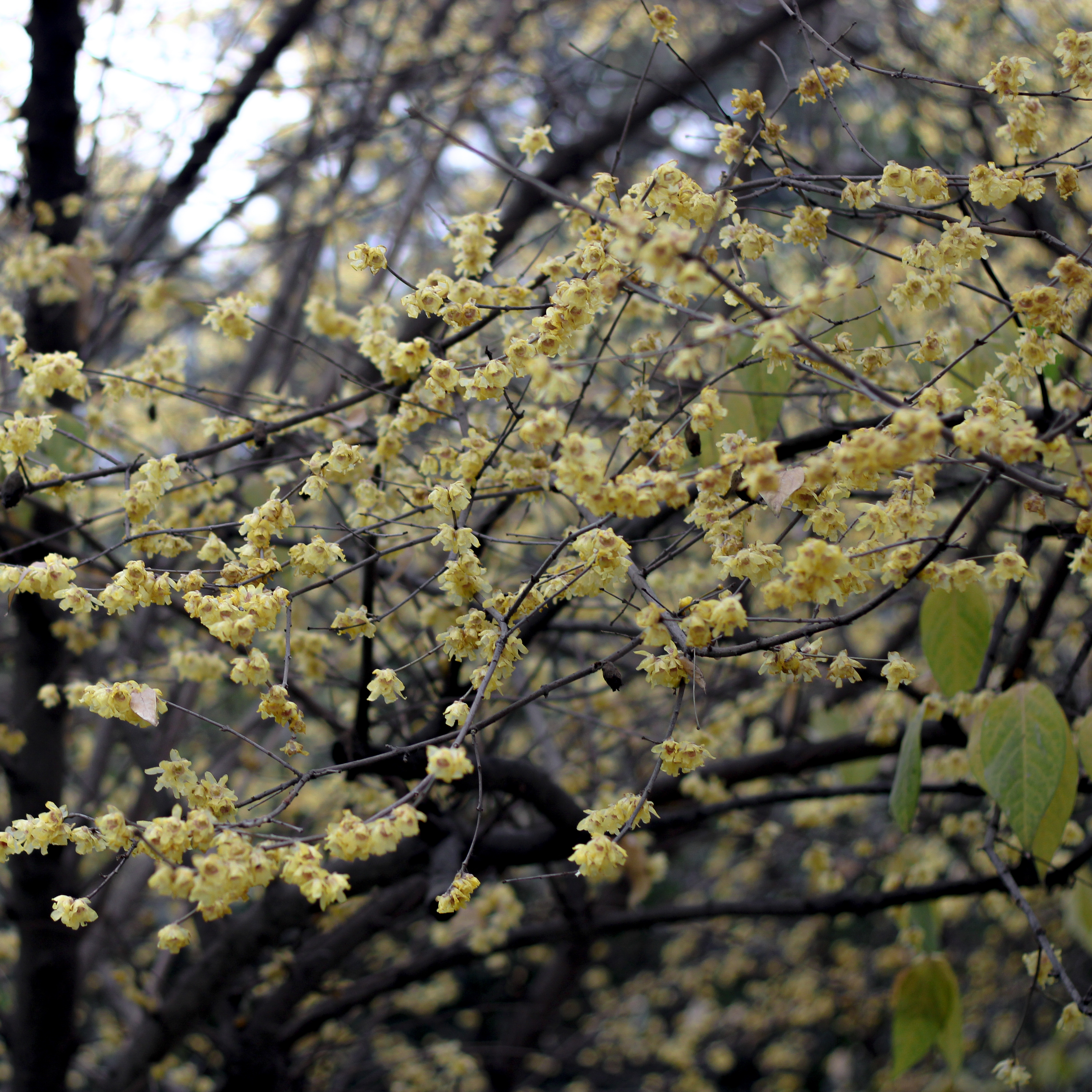
- Chimonanthus praecox flowers

Scientific classification
- Kingdom: Plantae
- Clade: Tracheophytes
- Clade: Angiosperms
- Clade: Magnoliids
- Order: Laurales
- Family: Calycanthaceae
- Genus: Chimonanthus; Lindl.

Type species
- Chimonanthus praecox

Species
- See text

Synonyms
- Meratia Loiseleur-Deslongchamps; Sources: ING, IPNI, CPN

= Chimonanthus =

Genus of flowering plants

Chimonanthus is a genus of flowering plants in the family Calycanthaceae, native to China, but is also cultivated elsewhere in Asia, including Iran. The genus includes three to six species depending on taxonomic interpretation; six are accepted by the Flora of China. The name means winter flower in Greek.

== Description ==
They are deciduous or evergreen shrubs growing to 2–13 m tall. The leaves are opposite, entire, 7–20 cm long and 3–7 cm broad. The flowers are 2–3 cm wide, with numerous spirally-arranged yellow or white tepals; they are strongly scented, and produced in late winter or early spring before the new leaves. The fruit is an elliptic dry capsule 3–4 cm long.

== Species ==
As of July 2020, Flora of China accepts the following species:

- Chimonanthus campanulatus R.H. Chang & C.S. Ding
- Chimonanthus grammatus M.C. Liu
- Chimonanthus nitens Oliv.
- Chimonanthus praecox (L.) Link
- Chimonanthus salicifolius S.Y. Hu
- Chimonanthus zhejiangensis M.C. Liu

== Cultivation and uses ==
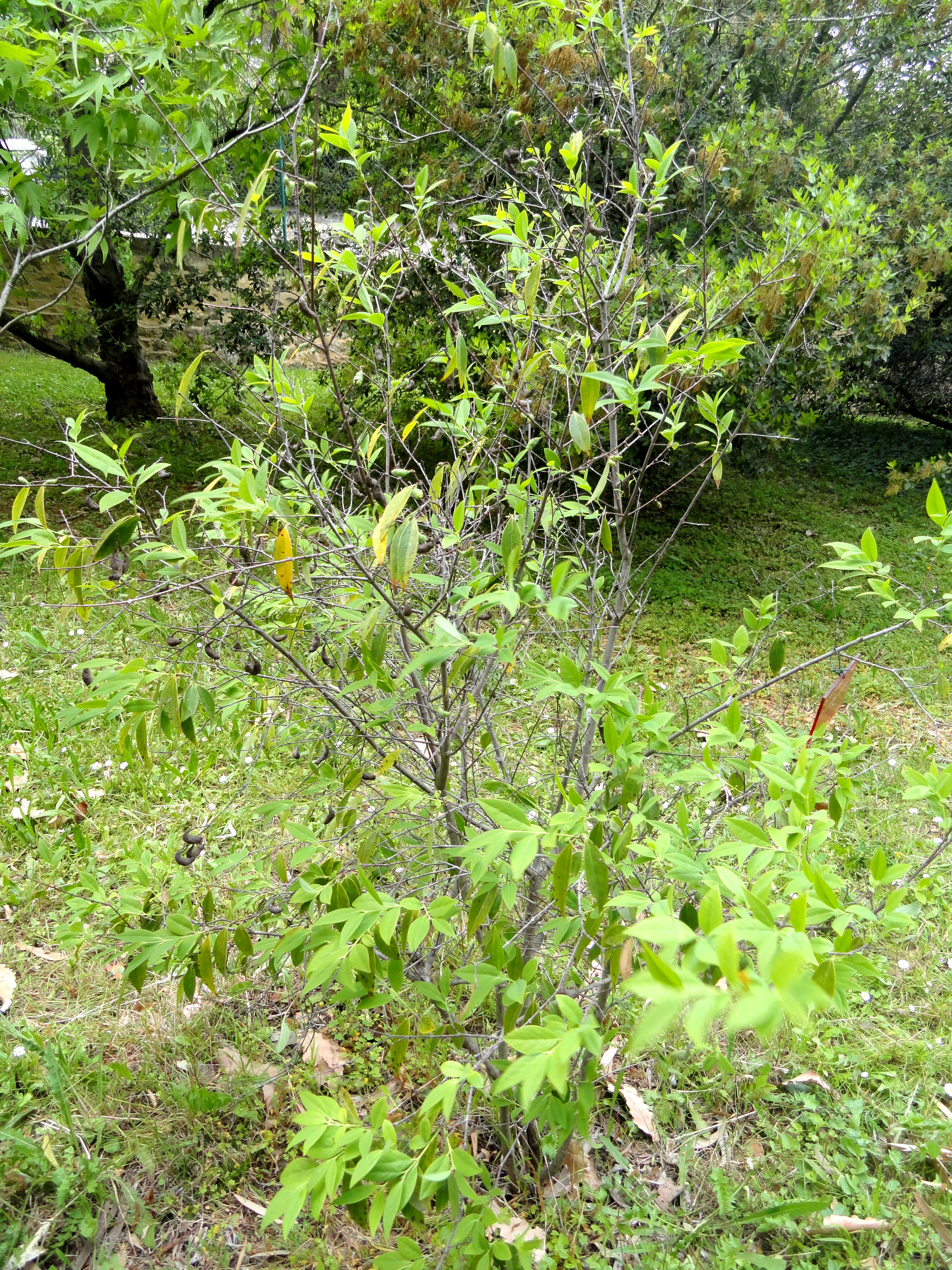
Chimonanthus salicifolius

Chimonanthus praecox ("wintersweet") is the only species widely grown as an ornamental plant, for its spicily scented winter flowers; these are also used in floristry as cut flowering branches, which can also be forced as with forsythia. The petals are quite waxy. The plant prefers medium exposure to sunlight or high dappled shade, a fresh climate (hardy to USDA Zone 7), and soft, acidic permeable ground not waterlogged in winter. A protected, south-facing wall encourages early flowering, and a position should be chosen where its spicy perfume can be appreciated while coming and going from the house. Space needs to be allowed for its eventual spread to 3 m (10 ft), since untimely summer pruning to keep an ill-sited shrub in check will sacrifice flowering the following winter.

In China Chimonanthus was domesticated during the Song dynasty and inspired courtly poems from the eleventh century; it flowers at the Chinese New Year, when flowering sprigs are used as hair ornaments. In China, prunings are dried and kept to perfume linen cupboards. The shrub was introduced to Japanese gardens from China in the early Edo period (probably between 1611 and 1629, according to Garden Plants of Japan). Its introduction into European gardens, from Japan, is noted for England, 1766, when it was grown under glass for the sixth Earl of Coventry in the conservatory at Croome Court, Worcestershire. By 1799 that shrub had grown to be 16 feet high and 10 feet wide. By that time it had been tried out of doors without winter protection and proved hardy in the south of England. Slips of it were distributed among nurserymen and so it entered European horticulture. A larger-flowered (though less fragrant) variety, "grandiflorus" was grown by the comtesse de Vandes in Bayswater, London, before 1819. A yellow-flowered variety (luteus, 1814) is also noted.

No notice has yet been found of Chimonanthus in an American colonial garden; it was first offered in an American catalogue in 1811. It is hardy at least to New York City, where frosts interrupt, but do not stop the flowering.

The flowers are said to be edible., and can be used to flavor tea.

At the end of its flowering, since it flowers most freely on ripened young wood and has little summer and autumn interest, it is thinned and pruned similarly to Forsythia by partly heading back and a few thick old stems removed at the ground.

Chimonanthus plants are frequently subject to attacks from aphids, and may be attacked by mites and leaf beetles.

== Culture symbolism ==
Chimonanthus is often mistaken for Prunus mume, as its name in Chinese ends with the character 梅 (mei). Both flower in the winter to spring time and are symbols that a new year is coming. However, when referred as Three Friends of Winter or Sui Han San You, Prunus mume together with pine and bamboo, is a trio of plants that are highly appreciated in Chinese culture for their endurance in severe winters.
