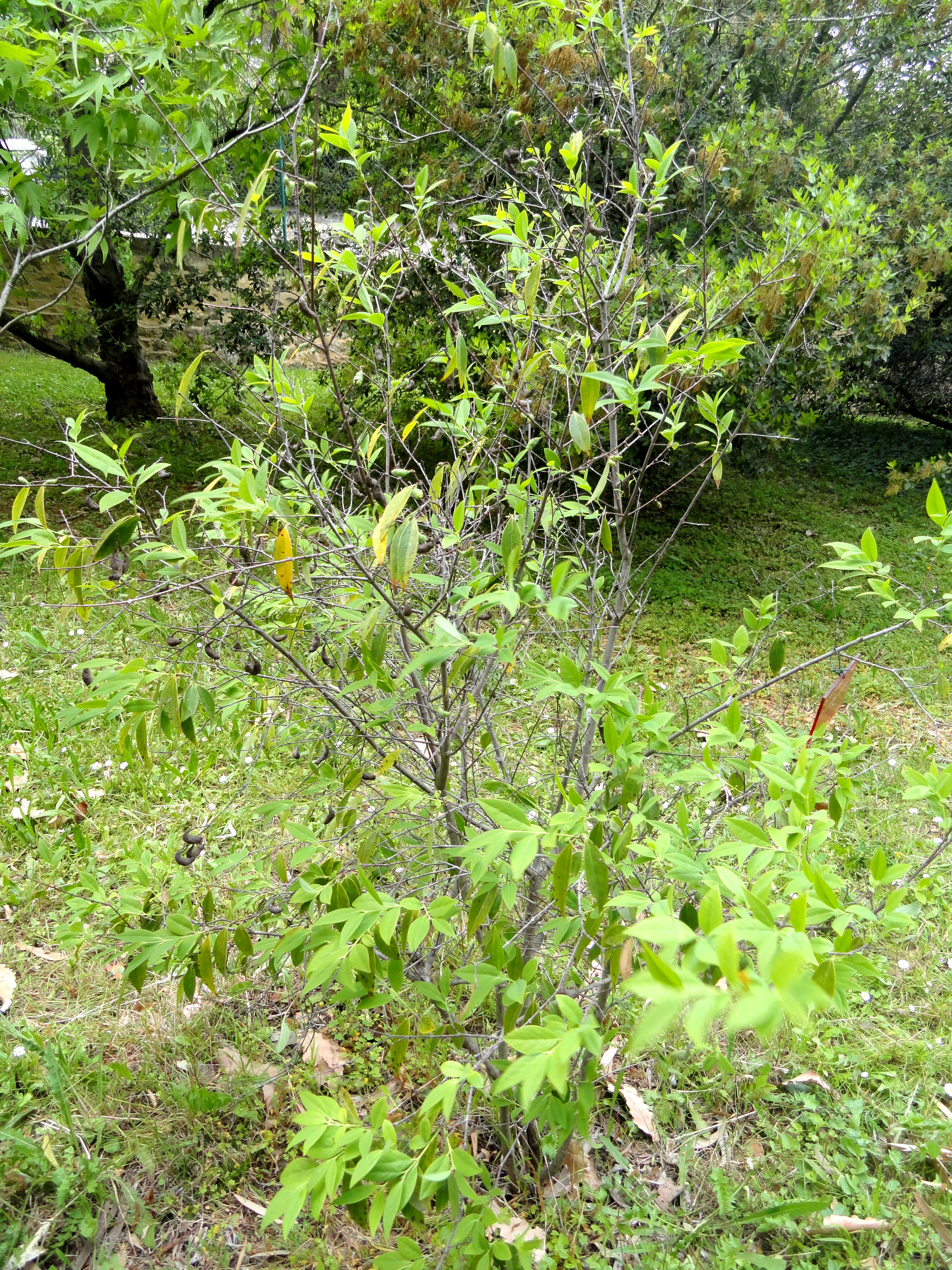

Scientific classification
- Kingdom: Plantae
- Clade: Tracheophytes
- Clade: Angiosperms
- Clade: Magnoliids
- Order: Laurales
- Family: Calycanthaceae
- Genus: Chimonanthus
- Species: C. salicifolius

Binomial name
- Chimonanthus salicifolius S.Y.Hu (1954) Sources: IPNI, CPN MBG

= Chimonanthus salicifolius =

Species of flowering plant

Chimonanthus salicifolius is a species of the genus of wintersweets Chimonanthus and member of the family Calycanthaceae.

== Description ==
A semi-evergreen shrub up to 4 m tall, with slender leaves 3–13 cm long and 1–3 cm broad; flowers yellowish, late summer or autumn.

== Distribution ==
Native

Palearctic
China: Anhui, Jiangxi, Zhejiang.
