= Solah Satra =

- Directed by: Munna Rizvi
- Produced by: Kiran Vohra
- Starring: Ekta Sohini; Arbaaz Ali Khan; Ashwin Verma
- Music by: Nadeem-Shravan
- Production company: Vijay Kiran Films
- Release date: 6 July 1990
- Country: India
- Language: Hindi

Solah Satra is a 1990 Indian romance film starring Ekta Sohini in her screen debut. Directed by Munna Rizvi, the film also stars Arbaaz and the debuting Ashwin Verma and Kulbhushan Kharbanda as antagonists. Ajit Vachani, Sushmita Mukherjee and Kunika play supporting roles. Famous Pakistani pop singer Hasan Jahangir made a special appearance in the song "Aapan Ka To Dil Hai Awara". The film was produced by Kiran Vohra under the Vijay Kiran Films banner.

== Cast ==
- Arbaaz Ali Khan as Vikram "Vicky" Kumar
- Ekta Sohini as Neha
- Ashwin Verma as Inspector Vishal
- Kulbhushan Kharbanda as Kedar Nath
- Sushmita Mukherjee as Rosie
- Ajit Vachani as Police Commissioner
- Kunika as Kedar Nath's wife
- Hasan Jahangir as Hassan (Special appearance in a song "Aapan Ka To Dil Hai Awara")

== Soundtrack ==
Solah Satra

Studio album by Nadeem-Shravan
- Released: 1990
- Genre: Feature film soundtrack
- Label: His Master's Voice
- Producer: Nadeem-Shravan

Nadeem-Shravan chronology
Baap Numbri Beta Dus Numbri (1990)	Solah Satra (1990)	Mere Humdaam (1990)

The music of Solah Satra is composed by Nadeem-Shravan under His Master's Voice banner with lyrics penned by Rani Malik and Saeed Rahi. Famous Pakistani pop singer Hasan Jahangir lent his voice for the track "Aapan Ka To Dil Hai Awara". "Ajab Zindagi Ka" by Vinod Rathod was the most successful song of the track.

=== Track listing ===
Solah Satra Disc One: Track listing
No.	Title	Lyrics	Singer(s)	Length
1.	"Aapan Ka To Dil Hai Awara"	Rani Malik	Hasan Jahangir, Chorus
2.	"Jab Se Tujhe Dekha"	Saeed Rahi	Udit Narayan
3.	"Yeh Pandrah Sola Satra"	Saeed Rahi	Mohammed Aziz, Sarika Kapoor

Solah Satra Disc Two: Track listing
No.	Title	Lyrics	Singer(s)	Length
1.	"Meri Nazar Mera Jigar"	Rani Malik	Suchitra Krishnamoorthi
2.	"Ajab Zindagi Ka"		Vinod Rathod
3.	"Ajab Zindagi Ka (Sad)"		Sarika Kapoor
4.	"Main Karta Hoon Tumse Pyar"	Saeed Rahi	Udit Narayan
