= Arayesh-e Khorshid =

Studio album by Kourosh Yaghmaei
- Released: 2000
- Recorded: 1980
- Genres: Folk; funk; psychedelic rock
- Label: Ahang Rooz

Kourosh Yaghmaei chronology
Kabous (1997)	Arayesh-e Khorshid (2000)	Tofang-E Daste Noghre (2001)

Arayesh-e Khorshid (Persian: آرایش خورشید; Make the Sun) is the tenth studio album by Iranian singer-songwriter and guitarist Kourosh Yaghmaei. The album includes a collection of Iranian folk songs that was released in 2000 by Ahang Rooz in Iran. It also censored one track before it was released. It features a traditional Persian folk song "Mastom, Mastom" ("Drunk, Drunk") which verse refers to an unrequited or impossible love.

== Background ==
Following the Islamic Revolution of 1979, Yaghmaei spent over a month for recording three Sol-e series albums. Initially this album was recorded as Sol-e 3. Where, Sol-e 1 was reissued in 1979 on CD as Parandeye Mohajer by Los Angeles-based record label Caltex Records, and Sol-e 2 was recorded with Fereydoon Foroughi and released in 1980.

== Track listing ==
No.	Title	Music	Performer	Length
1.	"Havar Havar" (Shout Shout)	Kourosh Yaghmaei		6:07
2.	"تو بیو"
3.	"درنه جان"
4.	"بارون بارونه"
5.	"Reihan"	Kourosh Yaghmaei		3:48
6.	"سر کوی دوست"
7.	"کلات"
8.	"Mastom, Mastom" ("Drunk, Drunk")		Kourosh & Helen Musakhani
9.	"Shekare Ahoo"

== Personnel ==
=== Musicians ===
- Kourosh Yaghmaei – lead vocals, guitar, bass guitar, choral, keyboard, orchestra arrangement
- Kamran Yaghmaei - rhythm guitar, drama, choral
- Kambiz Yaghmaei - keyboard, percussion, crawl
- Kaveh Yaghmaei – keyboard
- Satgin Yaghmaei – crawl
- Helen Musakhani – vocals
