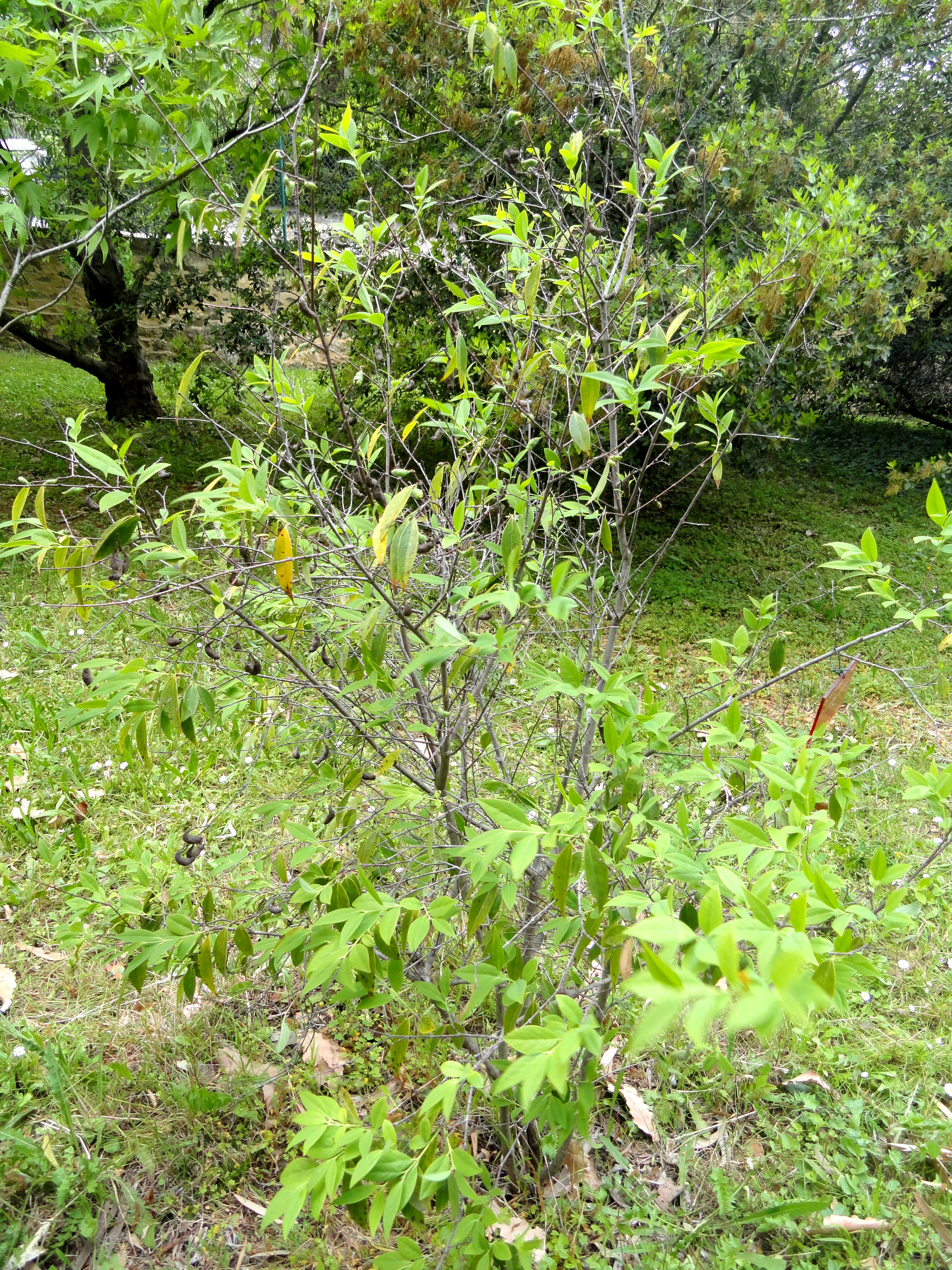

Scientific classification
- Kingdom: Plantae
- Clade: Tracheophytes
- Clade: Angiosperms
- Clade: Magnoliids
- Order: Laurales
- Family: Calycanthaceae
- Genus: Chimonanthus
- Species: C. nitens

Binomial name
- Chimonanthus nitens Oliv.

Synonyms
- Meratia nitens (Oliv.) Rehder & E.H. Wilson; Calycanthus nitens (Oliv.) Rehder

= Chimonanthus nitens =

Species of flowering plant

Chimonanthus nitens is a species of the genus Chimonanthus (wintersweets) and a member of the family Calycanthaceae.

== Description ==
Chimonanthus nitens is an evergreen shrub that grows up to 6 m tall, with leaves 2–18 cm long and 1.5–8 cm broad, and white to yellow flowers that appear in winter and are only slightly scented if at all.

== Distribution ==
Chimonanthus nitens is native to central and southern China.
