= Kashmere Stage Band =

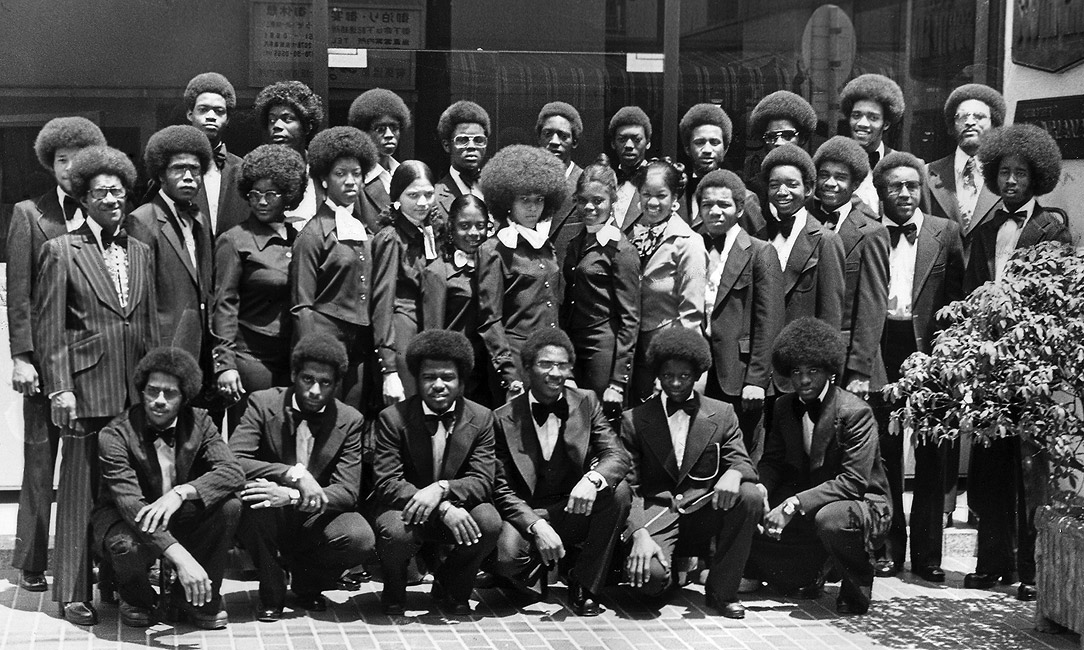
- Kashmere Stage Band

Background information
- Origin: Houston, Texas, U.S.
- Genres: Funk, soul
- Years active: 1968–1978
- Labels: Kram Records, Now-Again

Kashmere Stage Band (KSB) was an elite performing unit of the student band at Kashmere High School from the late 1960s until 1978.

== History ==
Kashmere High School is located in a predominantly black neighborhood known as Kashmere Gardens in Houston, Texas. Music teacher Conrad O. Johnson attended an Otis Redding concert in 1967 and was inspired to translate the style of the concert into a program he could sustain at the high school in order to create opportunities for his student musicians, and thus the Kashmere Stage Band was born. During its time, KSB won national championships in high school band competitions and gained a reputation as being unbeatable. Johnson served as band director, arranger, and principal composer for the band. KSB recorded eight albums during its life.

The teenagers in the Kashmere Stage Band produced a sound equal to that of the contemporary funk bands The J.B.'s and the Bar-Kays. Although lost for decades, since 2003 the KSB recordings have been released, some for the first time, on both vinyl record and CD and have become prized by hip-hop artists and DJs for their inimitable sound. A notable sampling occurs on the Handsome Boy Modeling School album So... How's Your Girl?; DJ Shadow’s track “Holy Calamity (Bear Witness II)” samples 'Kashmere' from the album Plays Originals. Stones Throw Records imprint label Now-Again Records released a compilation of KSB material in 2006, Texas Thunder Soul 1968–1974.

In February 2008, thirty original members of the Kashmere Stage Band, all in their mid-50s, reunited for the first time in over three decades to pay tribute to their legendary leader, Conrad "Prof" Johnson, who was 92 at the time. The story of Prof, the exceptional music program he built, and the historic reunion of his former students was captured in a feature-length documentary film, Thunder Soul, narrated by Jamie Foxx, released in theaters on September 23, 2011.

== Discography ==
- Our Thing (1969)
- Bumper to Bumper Soul (1970)
- Thunder Soul (1971)
- Zero Point (1972)
- Out of Gas "But Still Burning" (1973)
- Kashmere "73" Live In Concert (1973)
- Expo. '75 - Concert Tour Japan / Okinawa (1975)
- Plays Originals (1976)

Compilations

- Space City (Three Tee Records, 1980) (split with Bubbha Thomas)
- Texas Thunder Soul, 1968–1974 (Now-Again, 2006)
- Texas Thunder Soul, 1968–1974: Expanded Deluxe Edition (Now-Again, 2011)

== Popular culture ==
Kashmere Stage Band's song "Kashmere" was featured on the Baby Driver film's soundtrack, released under Columbia Records on June 23, 2017.
