= Hasan Jahangir =

Pakistani pop singer (born 1962)

Hassan Jahangir
- حسن جہانگیر
- Born: 1 July 1962 (age 64); Karachi, Sindh, Pakistan
- Other name: Michael Jackson of Pakistan
- Occupations: Singer; musician; lyricist; actor
- Years active: 1982 - present
- Children: 1
- Awards: Sitara-i-Imtiaz (Star of Excellence) Award by the Government of Pakistan in 2023 'Lifetime Achievement Award' by the Arts Council of Pakistan in 2024

Hassan Jahangir (also spelled Hasan Jahangir) (Urdu: حسن جہانگیر; born 1 July 1962) is a Pakistani Pop singer and one of the early singers of pop music in Pakistan. He is also known for being a Coke Studio Pakistan performing artist in 2018. He is also known as Michael Jackson of Pakistan due to his singing styles and dancing. He is best known for his 1987 blockbuster song "Hawa Hawa," which propelled him to international fame. He is regarded as one of the most influential musical figures in South Asian history and is the subcontinent's first ever pop star. His enduring career has seen him become a cultural icon across South Asia, with his catchy beats and charismatic persona inspiring generations.

He gained fame in 1987 with hit singles "Hawa Hawa", "Hato Bacho", and "Shadi Na Karna Yaro".

He released his first single "Imran Khan is a Superman" in 1982 and in June 1987 went on to release his only internationally famous album, Hawa Hawa. It sold approximately 15 million copies in India. His music was acclaimed in South Asia, most notably Pakistan and India.

In 2011, with a fresh twist to a Bengali folk song "Dol Dol Doloni", he came back into Pakistani music scene after being absent for a long period.

Bollywood film Mubarakan (2017) also contains a remixed version of the Pakistani song "Hawa Hawa" written by Rehan Azmi and sung by Hassan Jahangir in 1987.

== Early life ==
He was born in Karachi, Sindh in Pakistan; his father was from Iran, and his mother from Bengal. He was inspired by famous American singer Michael Jackson also known as the King of Pop.

Jahangir's Iranian and Bengali heritage in his upbringing contributed to his unique musical style.

== Career ==
=== Early work and debut (1982–1986) ===
In his early days, Hasan was known for his high-energy performances and distinctive fashion sense. He described his style as creating his own looks by buying clothes from local bazaars. This self-created image, along with his electrifying stage presence, helped him stand out from other artists of the time. Jahangir's very first release came in 1982 with the single "Imran Khan is a Superman". This song was a homage to the legendary Pakistani cricket star, Imran Khan.

=== Rise to prominence and success (1987) ===
When Pakistani music was dominated by classical and folk traditions, Jahangir’s energetic pop songs introduced a fresh, modern sound. His success helped shape the emerging pop genre and opened the door for future artists in both Pakistan and India.

Hasan's breakthrough was the success of his 1987 debut album, Hawa Hawa, which turned him into an international pop icon across South Asia. The album's success, particularly the title track, defined the start of a new era for Pakistani pop music and established Jahangir as a major musical force. It was released in June 1987, the Hawa Hawa album was reported to have sold approximately 15 million copies in India alone, making it a chart-topping sensation across the subcontinent. The sales figures were particularly significant given the political tensions between India and Pakistan at the time.

Hasan's song "Hawa Hawa", became an international anthem, with its catchy, universally appealing beat transcending language barriers. It became a fixture at celebrations and weddings for decades. Hasan's other song "Shadi Na Karna Yaro" (Friends, Don't Get Married) connected with audiences on a relatable level while maintaining an upbeat, danceable tune.

Other notable singles from the Hawa Hawa album that helped define his early sound included "Hato Bacho" and "Shadi Na Karna Yaro".

Despite its massive popularity, Jahangir revealed in a 2017 interview with CatchNews.com that "Hawa Hawa" was initially banned in Pakistan, as it was considered "low-class". However, the ban was ineffective in stopping the song's grassroots popularity.

=== Popularity in India (1987) ===
In 1987, he visited India and he was welcomed by Bollywood stars. He was going to perform his hit song Hawa Hawa in a stadium in a concert in Mumbai, but due to his fame and the immense rush it was impossible to reach the concert. Then a helicopter was arranged at the official level and then Hasan Jahangir was taken to the concert through the helicopter and it was a great success.

Regarding this, Hassan said:

That was a memorable day in my life. Very few artists get such stardom and love. The madness of music lovers and madmen was related to watching, a sea of human beings was visible everywhere.

The Prime Minister of India Rajiv Gandhi invited him to Delhi at the 7, Race Course Road and hosted a dinner in his honour.

In 1988, Hasan's hit song "Hawa Hawa" was featured in the 1988 Indian film Don 2 which was picturized on Jeet Upendra. The film became a hit at the box office and both the song and film became very famous.

=== Bollywood's influence (1990–1994) ===
In 1990, he made a special appearance in the song "Aapan Ka To Dil Hai Awara" in the film Solah Satra and his small screen time received positive reviews. He was offered by Indian film producers and directors to work in their films but he refused. Later he was offered to work in Bollywood music industry but he refused that offer as well.

Hasan's original song was featured in Insaaf Apne Lahoo Se (1994) and his original 1987 recording of "Hawa Hawa" was used in the film.

=== Comeback to music (2011–2012) ===
Jahangir made his official comeback after a lengthy period of inactivity with a fresh take on the Bengali folk song "Dol Dol Doloni".

After a long period away from the music scene, Jahangir officially made his return in 2011. He released a new version of the Bengali folk song "Dol Dol Doloni". In interviews that year, Jahangir expressed his commitment to creating new music while also noting that he had continued to perform at various gigs and functions during his time away from the spotlight.

Hriday Shetty, the director of the Bollywood film Chaalis Chauraasi, personally tracked down Jahangir to get the rights to re-record "Hawa Hawa" for the movie. Jahangir sang the song himself for this new version.

=== Mainstream recognition on Coke Studio (2017-2025) ===
In 2017, the Bollywood comedy Mubarakan featured a remixed version of Jahangir's 1987 blockbuster song "Hawa Hawa". While Jahangir was not involved in the new version, the remake brought his iconic track back into the mainstream consciousness, introducing it to a new generation of listeners but this new version further solidified its status as a timeless classic.

Hasan Jahangir's song "Phone Call Karoni" was released in 2018 as a single the music for the song was composed by Vijoy Kashyap, with lyrics and vocals by Hasan Jahangir and the tune of "Phone Call Karoni" was inspired by the Bengali folk song it had a romantic track, the song features a more upbeat, modern production style compared to his 1980s music, while still maintaining his signature pop sound.

The most significant moment of Jahangir's resurgence occurred in 2018 when he appeared on Coke Studio Pakistan and his performance of a new rendition of "Hawa Hawa" with singer Gul Panra was a massive success. Hasan's collaboration was a nostalgic tribute to his past while also bringing his sound to a contemporary audience.

=== Rise to global stardom (2026) ===
In March 2026, Jahangir received $50,000 (approx. ₹46 lakh) for the use of "Hawa Hawa" in the Bollywood film Dhurandhar: The Revenge, starring Ranveer Singh. He has been a vocal advocate for the legal licensing of Pakistani music in Indian cinema.

In late 2025, he released the single "Piyar Di Gaddi Dhak Dhak Chaldi," which performed well on digital streaming platforms. In March 2026, he headlined the "Dubai Dhamaal" concert, performing for the South Asian diaspora in the UAE.

== Personal life ==
Hassan was married and his daughter Sehar Hassan is a voice actress. In a 2026 interview on the show Shan-e-Sahoor, he revealed that he raised his only daughter single-handedly following the death of his wife nearly 30 years ago. He chose not to remarry to focus entirely on his daughter's upbringing. She is a medical doctor residing in Sweden.

== Philanthropy ==
He has utilized his status as a prominent musician to draw attention to and advocate for various social issues. Jahangir has actively worked to assist children, youth, and women who are in distress in Karachi's less-resourced communities. In 2022 on August 17, Hassan publicly appreciated Sahara Homecare Services for its quality of service.

== Impact and achievements ==
=== Influence and legacy ===
Even before "Hawa Hawa," Jahangir was cultivating a unique style. He was known for his high-energy performances and for sourcing his stage outfits from local markets. He claimed to be the first artist in the subcontinent to perform shirtless, a move later adopted by Bollywood actors.

He was the first artist in the South Asian subcontinent to perform shirtless on stage, and that Bollywood superstar Salman Khan later adopted the style. Jahangir has described himself as a trendsetter in music and fashion, and he views the shirtless look as part of his overall innovative stage presence during his peak in the 1980s.

Jahangir has also explained where he got the idea for the look. He stated that he was inspired by English magazines of the era, such as Rolling Stone, which John Stamos, and Shaun Cassidy were famous on beaches with their bodies visible.

The tune for "Hawa Hawa" was based on the 1970s Persian song "Havar Havar," demonstrating Jahangir's ability to blend different cultural sounds into a new, broadly appealing hit. This ability to create a universal musical language was a key factor in his international breakthrough. He was inspired by the Iranian singer Kourosh Yaghmaei. Jahangir's massive 1987 hit, "Hawa Hawa," was an adaptation of Yaghmaei's 1970s Persian song, "Havar Havar". Due to the immense popularity of "Hawa Hawa" in India, its melody was often copied without authorization. For example, the tune was unofficially adapted for the song "Jawan Jawan Ishq Jawan" in the 1989 Govinda-starrer Billoo Badshah. The tune was also adapted for the 1989 film Aag Ka Gola.

Jahangir was one of the early pioneers of the pop music genre in Pakistan. At a time when classical and folk music dominated the airwaves, his vibrant, beat-driven songs offered a fresh, modern sound. His ability to create infectious and catchy beats with witty lyrics had a lasting impact on the Pakistani and broader South Asian music scene, paving the way for future pop artists.

The enduring appeal of the song has inspired numerous Bollywood remixes and remakes over the years. A new version of "Hawa Hawa" was released as a promotional single for the 2017 film Mubarakan, though this one was sung by Mika Singh.

Jahangir's connection with Bollywood goes beyond individual songs. In a 2017 interview with CatchNews.com, he expressed his pleasure with his influence on Indian music and his pride in his style, which he mentioned influenced artists like Bollywood actor Salman Khan.

== Discography ==
=== Studio albums ===
- Imran Khan is a Superman (1982), his first single released
- Hawa Hawa (a mehndi song) (1987) based on Irani Dadra), (this hit song sold around 15 million copies in India)
- Hato Bacho
- Shadi Na Karna Yaro
- Dil Hai Diwana
- Dil Jo Tujh Pe Aaya Hai
- Zindagi Hai Pyar
- Maigha Jaise Roye
- Le Bhi Le Dil Tu Mera
- Shawa, Keh Nakhra
- Na Jao, Zara Mehandi Lagao
- Aaya Hai Mausam Pyar Ka
- Yeh Fashion Ke Naye Rang
- Jee Jee O Parah Disco
- Kis Naam Se Pukaroon
- Booba Booba Ba Ra Ra Ra
- Aa Jaana Dil Hai Deewana
- Dol Dol Doloni (based on a Bengali folk tune)
- Phone Call Karoni
- Hawa Hawa, song on Coke Studio (Pakistan): featuring Hasan Jahangir, Gul Panra and Baloch Lewa, Coke Studio, Season 11 (2018)
- Dil Hai Deewana (2021)
- Dol Dol (2023)
- Hawa Hawa 2.0 (2024)
- Respect For The Champions (2024)
- Ye Lamhay Aise Aye Hen (2024)
- Piyar Di Gaddi Dhak Dhak Chaldi (2026)

=== Film soundtracks ===
- Don 2 (1988)
- Aag Ka Gola (1989)
- Billoo Badshah (1989)
- Solah Satra (1990)
- Insaaf Apne Lahoo Se (1994)
- Chaalis Chauraasi (2012)
- Mubarakan (2017)
- Dhurandhar: The Revenge (2026)

== Honours and tributes ==
Tributes were paid to Hassan Jahangir at an event held in his honor at the Arts Council of Pakistan in Karachi on July 5, 2024, where he was also given a Lifetime Achievement Award. The event celebrated his career and lasting influence on Pakistani pop music.

Zahid Shah called Jahangir a "pride of Pakistan" for his achievements in music.

Speakers at the event highlighted the incredible longevity of Jahangir's music. Kashif Grami, a former colleague, noted that the song "Hawa Hawa" made history and that people were still singing it almost 40 years later.

On July 4, 2024 the Government of Pakistan named a street, highway and an academy in the Taimuria Library after him in Karachi.

Azhar Hussain, who played drums on the original "Hawa Hawa," recalled how the song brought both him and Hassan to international recognition. Muhammad Ahmed Shah the President of Arts Council called Jahangir a "messenger of joy" and thanked the government for recognizing the contributions of artists.

Amjad Shah recalled a time when no wedding ceremony was complete without Jahangir's songs, underscoring his deep cultural impact and widespread appeal. Azhar Hussain, who played drums on the original "Hawa Hawa," spoke about how the song brought them both global recognition.

== Ambassadorship ==
- Ambassador of Happiness in 2024.

== Awards and recognition ==
Year	Award	Category	Result	Title	Ref.
2023	Sitara-i-Imtiaz	Star of Excellence	Won	Music	
2024	Lifetime Achievement Award	Arts Council of Pakistan	Won	Pop Music	
