= Insaaf Apne Lahoo Se =

- Directed by: Latif Khan
- Written by: Kader Khan; Santosh Saroj
- Produced by: Arun Kumar Muchhala; L.R. Shaikh
- Starring: Sanjay Dutt; Shatrughan Sinha; Farah Naaz; Sonam
- Cinematography: Ishwar Bidri
- Edited by: Mukhtar Ahmed
- Music by: Laxmikant–Pyarelal
- Release date: 18 March 1994
- Country: India
- Language: Hindi

Insaaf Apne Lahoo Se (transl. Justice is in his blood) is a 1994 Indian Hindi-language action film directed by Latif Khan, starring Shatrughan Sinha, Sanjay Dutt, Shekhar Suman, Farah Naaz, Sonam, and Gulshan Grover. It was released on 18 March 1994.

== Plot ==
Mahendra Pratap Singh is a lawyer who live a wealthy lifestyle. He gets married again after his wife's death to Geeta, who has a son named Devilal from a prior marriage. Mahendra Pratap dislikes Devilal. He asks Geeta to make a choice between him and her son. Seeing his mother in a difficult situation Devilal decides to leave the house himself but he also threatens Mahendra and swears to take revenge.

Thereafter Geeta is arrested on charge of murder of another lawyer. The murdered lawyer's wife and Mahendra give testimony against her in court. A pregnant Geeta is sentenced to 14 years of imprisonment. While in jail she gives birth to a son and names him Raju. She instills hatred against Mahendra in Raju, right from his childhood.

A grown up Raju and Deva later try to take revenge on Mahendra but they find out that the main culprit is someone else.

== Cast ==
- Sanjay Dutt as Raju
- Shatrughan Sinha as Devilal "Deva"
- Farah Naaz as Rani
- Sonam as Nisha
- Kulbhushan Kharbanda as Mahendra Pratap Singh
- Gita Siddharth as Geeta Pratap Singh
- Shekhar Suman as Mohan Prasad
- Kader Khan as Hardwarilal
- Gulshan Grover as Jimmy
- Beena Banerjee as Roopa Saxena
- Bob Christo as Bob
- Sameer Khakhar as Khopdi, Rani's father

== Soundtrack ==
#	Song title	Singer(s)
1	"Aankhon Mein Sanson Mein"	Kavita Krishnamurthy, Alka Yagnik, Mohammed Aziz
2	"Hawa Hawa"	Hassan Jahangir
3	"Ek Aur Do Idhar Dekho"	Amit Kumar, Sapna Mukherjee
5	"Jhoomoongi Naachoongi Magan Main Gaoongi"	Anuradha Paudwal
6	"Jeet Lenge Baazi Haari"	Kavita Krishnamurthy, Sudesh Bhosle
7	"Athanni Chawanni Tu Phekata Ja"	Alka Yagnik, Jolly Mukherjee
