= Gol-e Yakh =

- Iranian single sleeve

Single by Kourosh Yaghmaei
- A-side: "Del Dareh Pir Misheh"
- Released: 1973
- Genre: Psychedelic pop; Psychedelic rock; Folk rock
- Length: 5:07
- Label: Ahang Rooz; Now-Again (2012 reissue)
- Songwriters: Kourosh Yaghmaei; Mahdi Akhavan Langeroudi
- Producer: Kourosh Yaghmaei

Kourosh Yaghmaei singles chronology
"Gol-e Yakh" / "Del Dareh Pir Misheh" (1973)	"Leila" / "Paiz" (1973)

"Gol-e Yakh" (Persian: گل یخ; "Ice Flower", or "Winter Sweet") is the debut single by Iranian singer-songwriter and guitarist Kourosh Yaghmaei. The song is a melancholic ballad about love that endures through the bitterest winters. "Gol-e Yakh" was a huge success; selling more than five million copies in the domestic market. Since its release, it has been performed several times within and outside of Iran. It brought fame to Yaghmaei and was translated into and adapted for other languages.

The song was backed with the single "Del Dareh Pir Misheh," an Iranian-style garage rock song; both were released in Iran in 1973 by Iranian record label Ahang Rooz and in the United States on February 2, 2012 by Now Again Records.

== Overview ==
Yaghmaei made the single while studying at Shahid Beheshti University in Tehran. The lyrics were written by Yaghmaei and Mahdi Akhavan Langeroudi, Yaghmaei's university friend and modern Persian poet.

Several companies were interested in distributing "Gol-e Yakh", but eventually record company Ahange Rooz won the bid.

The single was said to have sold 5 million copies in Iran, though Yaghmaei claims he only received 22,500 Iranian tomans, which covered only the musician and recording costs. He claimed not to have received any royalties as of 2010.

While composing his song "Dar Enteha", Yaghmaei turned on his reel to record, not realizing "Gol-e Yakh" was on it. Accidentally, "Gol-e Yakh" was played in reverse. Yaghmaei loved the inverted version, so he included it in "Dar Enteha" as the beginning of the vocalist's melody, and wrote the rest of the song based on it.

The song was reissued on Yaghmaei's compilation albums The Best of Kourosh Yaghmaei: Gol-e Yakh (1991), and Back from the Brink: Pre-Revolution Psychedelic Rock from Iran: 1973-1979 (2011).

== In popular culture ==
The song "Gol-e Yakh" is sampled on several albums by various Western artists. The 2018 "Adam and Eve" on the album Nasir by American rapper Nas features the song as its main backing sample.

In 2005, Iranian drama film Gol-e Yakh directed by Kiumars Poorahmad was named after this song. The song was also featured in Desiree Akhavan's film Appropriate Behavior (2014).
