= Vinyl Days =

Studio album by Logic
- Released: June 17, 2022
- Recorded: 2021–2022
- Genre: Hip-hop
- Length: 71:58
- Labels: Visionary; Def Jam
- Producers: 6ix; Alfiiii; DJ Khalil; JRB; the Kount; Logic; Mario Luciano; PSTMN; Steve Wyreman; T-Minus; Tae Beast; Vig

Logic chronology
Bobby Tarantino III (2021)	Vinyl Days (2022)	College Park (2023)

Singles from Vinyl Days
- 1. "Decades" Released: April 22, 2022; 2. "Tetris" Released: April 22, 2022; 3. "Therapy Music" Released: May 6, 2022; 4. "Vinyl Days" Released: May 20, 2022; 5. "Orville" Released: May 27, 2022; 6. "Bleed It" Released: June 3, 2022; 7. "Breath Control" Released: June 10, 2022

Vinyl Days is the seventh studio album by American rapper Logic, released on June 17, 2022, by Visionary Music Group and Def Jam Recordings, marking his final album with both labels. It contains 30 songs, making it the album with the most tracks in his discography, and features guest appearances from Action Bronson, Currensy, Russ, Wiz Khalifa, Royce da 5'9, RZA, AZ, DJ Premier, the Game, and more. Production was primarily handled by 6ix, with additional work by Logic himself, T-Minus, and Mario Luciano, among others.

Vinyl Days was released to positive reviews from music critics.

== Background ==
The project was first announced and teased on his social media on January 11, 2022. "Decades" and "Tetris" were released as the first two singles of the project on April 22. Logic spoke out on social media about mistreatment by his label, Def Jam, detailing that they had messed up his release plans for the singles and subsequent music video. He then announced the project would be slated for a June 2022 release. The album contains a lot of samples, hence Logic announcing that the project would be released once all the samples clear. On the Pep Talk Podcast prior to the album's release, Logic noted that Vinyl Days was created in a 12-day span and that the creative process was turned into a documentary to accompany the release. The album art can be characterized as a photo of Logic's son, Bobby, sitting on an office chair in the middle of a messy room riddled with various pop culture references. Some of the pop culture references on the album cover include a Back to the Future Part II hoverboard, the same type of drum machine that the revered J Dilla used (MPC 3000), a baby Groot from the film series Guardians of the Galaxy, a poster of Quentin Tarantino's ninth film Once Upon a Time in Hollywood, a teaser poster for Kill Bill: Volume 3, an MF Doom poster, Eazy-E's 1988 Eazy-Duz-It album, electric guitars, recording equipment, dozens of vinyl records, and a green road sign which previews the title of his next album College Park which he announced on numerous songs throughout the album such as "LaDonda", "Clouds", "Kickstyle", and "Sayonara".

== Release and promotion ==
Vinyl Days was released on June 17, 2022. Prior to the album's release, he released music videos for Breath Control, Clouds, and Tetris respectively. In an interview with NPR after the album's release, Logic said "I chose Vinyl Days because we actually recorded the entire album in about 12 days, for a wild reason that I'll explain another time".

A verse in the song, "LaDonda", revolving around music critic Anthony Fantano, who had given Logic negative reviews in the past, generated controversy and discussion online due to a portion of the verse in which Logic recounts, “I used to fantasize about murdering you, choking you to death and watching from your point of view ’til we got friendly”. Fantano, not having been alerted of the contents of the verse ahead of time, heard the line for the first time during a livestream, causing him to go on a rant. He stated that the line had made him feel “embarrassed”, further adding, “I feel overemphasized. There never should have been any reason Logic should hate me in the first place. Because I’m just reviewing albums. You’re just one of many guys whose albums I review negatively.”

The album was released in the same week as projects by two high-profile hip-hop artists, Honestly, Nevermind by Drake and Khaza by Kevin Gates.

On July 4th, over two weeks after the release of the album, Logic announced that he had signed to BMG Speaking on signing with BMG, he stated “I’m just glad to move on to a place where I can be independent, and respected as an artist, and feel like I’m in control of my career.”

On July 16, Logic released a documentary that detailed the making of and inspirations for the album.

== Critical reception ==
Professional ratings
Review scores
Source	Rating
AllMusic	3.5/5 stars
HipHopDX	3.5/5
Pitchfork	6.4/10
Riff Magazine	6/10
Atwood Magazine	8/10

Vinyl Days received generally positive reviews from music critics. Brady Brickner-Wood from Pitchfork gave a mixed review saying, "Both impressive and tiring, Logic's seventh studio album stuffs 30 tracks' worth of throwback beats and technical rapping into overbearing conceptual frameworks." Tim Hoffman from Riff Magazine also gave a positive review stating, "for what it's worth, it's nice to have an energetic and passionate presence like Logic's return." Riley Wallace from HipHopDX gave another positive review stating, "Conceptually, the sequencing and pace of the LP is stellar; it sounds excellent, the features show up and show out and the skits, though maybe overkill, do help give things a ’90s college radio mixtape feel (complete with Funk Flex as a de facto host and hype man)." David Crone from AllMusic stated that "With an end to producing a smaller, more substantive set of ideas, the Vinyl Days sessions might have produced another five-star effort in Logic’s catalog; though all too brief, these flashes of rap’s golden era are colored in all the right hues. Vinyl Days isn’t the second coming of Young Sinatra, but it may mark the start of a compelling new dawn for the MC."

== Commercial performance ==
Vinyl Days was expected to debut on the Billboard 200 with projected sales of 35,000 to 45,000 units. Vinyl Days debuted at number 12 on the US Billboard 200 chart. This became Logic's eighth US top 20 debut.

== Track listing ==
No.	Title	Writer(s)	Producer(s)	Length
1.	"Danger"	Sir Robert Bryson Hall II; Arjun Ivatury; David Anthony Guy; Homer Steinweiss; Leon Michels; Nick Movshon; Thomas Brenneck	6ix; Logic	0:44
2.	"Tetris"	Hall II; Ivatury; Lester Abrams	6ix; Logic	2:04
3.	"In My Lifetime" (featuring Action Bronson)	Hall II; Ariyan Arslani; Kourosh Yaghmaei	Logic	1:48
4.	"Decades"	Hall II; Ivatury; Donte Perkins; James H. Marshall; Kyle Metcalfe; Tyler Mathew Carl Williams	6ix; PSTMN; T-Minus; Tae Beast	2:28
5.	"JJ Abrahams"	Hall II; Koal Harrison	Logic; The Kount	0:19
6.	"BlackWhiteBoy"	Hall II; Ivatury; Lakhari Theodore Boyd	6ix; Tedd Boyd	3:01
7.	"Quasi"	Hall II; Tom Nehls	Logic	1:45
8.	"Bleed It"	Hall II; Ivatury; Adam Keefe Horovitz; Adam Nathaniel Yauch; Barbara Patkova; Dan Smith; Jack Yglesias; Jake Ferguson; Malcolm Catto; Michael Louis Diamond; Raven Bush	6ix; Logic	2:31
9.	"LaDonda"	Hall II; Regional Garland	Logic	2:14
10.	"Aaron Judge"	Hall II; Mario Luciano	Logic; Mario Luciano	0:23
11.	"Clouds" (featuring Langston Bristol and Currensy)	Hall II; Ivatury; Kyle Metcalfe; Shante Scott Franklin	6ix; Logic; PSTMN	2:53
12.	"Michael Rap"	Hall II; Koal Harrison; Steve Wyreman	Logic; Steve Wyreman; The Kount	0:45
13.	"Therapy Music" (featuring Russ)	Hall II; Ivatury; Benny Maupin; Bill Summers; Blackbird McKnight; Michael Clark; Paul Jackson; Russell Vitale	6ix	4:22
14.	"Tony Revolori"	Hall II; Mario Luciano	Logic; Mario Luciano	1:30
15.	"Rogue One"	Hall II; Ivatury; Clayton Gunnels; Clyde Stubblefield; Darryl Jamison; Frank Waddy; James Brown; Johnny Griggs; Phelps "Catfish" Collins; Robert McCollough; William Collins	6ix	1:34
16.	"Breath Control" (featuring Wiz Khalifa)	Hall II; Ivatury; Cameron Thomaz; Nicholas Smith; Ronald LaTour	6ix	2:27
17.	"NEMS"	Hall II; Koal Harrison; Steve Wyreman	Logic; Steve Wyreman; The Kount	0:47
18.	"Nardwuar" (featuring Doc D)	Hall II; John Ruskin; Michael Parkinson	Logic	1:26
19.	"Kickstyle" (featuring IamJMARS, Big Lenbo and C Dot Castro)	Hall II; Ivatury; Christopher Castro; James Branch; Jan Weissenfeldt; Jordan Thornton; Leon Ressalam	6ix; Logic	2:50
20.	"EarlyBird"	Hall II; Mario Luciano; Donte Perkins	Logic; Mario Luciano; Tae Beast	1:07
21.	"Ten Years" (featuring Royce da 5'9)	Hall II; Joseph Bellah; Ryan Montgomery; Vignesh Vishwanathan	JRB; Vig	3:01
22.	"Porta One" (featuring RZA)	Hall II; Ivatury; David Axelrod; Robert Diggs	6ix	2:06
23.	"NeedleDrop"	Hall II; Koal Harrison; Mario Luciano	Logic; Mario Luciano; The Kount	1:26
24.	"Introducing Nezi" (featuring Nezi Momodu)	Hall II; Ivatury; Khalil Abdul-Rahman; Nezi Momodu	6ix; DJ Khalil	2:47
25.	"Orville" (featuring Like, Blu and Exile)	Hall II; Ivatury; Aleksander Manfredi; Gabriel Stevenson; Gilbert O'Sullivan; John Barnes III	6ix	3:22
26.	"Carnival" (featuring AZ)	Hall II; Ivatury; Anthony Cruz; Kyle Metcalfe; Lester Abrams	6ix; PSTMN	2:34
27.	"Lena's Insight"	Hall II; Christopher Pegram; Mario Luciano; Vignesh Vishwanathan	ALFIii; Logic; Mario Luciano; Vig	0:58
28.	"Vinyl Days" (featuring DJ Premier)	Hall II; Ivatury; Charles Bernstein; Chris Martin	6ix	4:42
29.	"I Guess I Love It" (featuring the Game)	Hall II; Ivatury; Allen Toussaint; Jayceon Taylor; Tom Nehls	6ix; Logic	3:48
30.	"Sayonara"	Hall II; Ivatury; James Reese; Marlene King	6ix	10:03
Total length:				71:58

=== Notes ===
- "In My Lifetime" and "I Guess I Love It" are stylized in sentence case.
- "BlackWhiteBoy" is stylized in all caps.

=== Vocal credits ===
- "Danger" features uncredited vocals from Morgan Freeman.
- "JJ Abrahams" features uncredited vocals from J. J. Abrams.
- "Aaron Judge" features uncredited vocals from Aaron Judge.
- "Michael Rap" features uncredited vocals from Michael Rapaport.
- "Tony Revolori" features uncredited vocals from Tony Revolori.
- "NEMS" features uncredited vocals from Gorilla Nems.
- "Nardwuar" features uncredited vocals from Nardwuar.
- "EarlyBird" features uncredited vocals from Earl Sweatshirt and Rainn Wilson.
- "NeedleDrop" features uncredited vocals from Anthony Fantano.
- "Lena's Insight" features uncredited vocals from Lena Waithe.
- "Sayonara" features an uncredited outro from Eothen "Egon" Alapatt.

=== Samples ===
- "Danger" contains a sample of Charles Bradley's "Black Velvet".
- "Quasi" contains a sample of Tom Nehl's "Sky Paintings".
- "Bleed It" contains samples of Beastie Boys' "Ch-Check It Out" and The Heliocentrics's "Venom".
- "LaDonda" contains a sample of Regional Garland's "Fifteen Ain't Young No More".
- "Rogue One" contains a sample of The J.B.'s "The Grunt".
- "Nardwuar" contains a sample of Strictly from Hunger's "Trying to Make the Best".
- "Kickstyle" contains samples of Oneness of Juju's "Introduction" and "Contradiction" and J.J. Whitefield's "Shir-Khan".
- "Porta One" contains a sample of David Axelrod's "Terri's Tune".
- "Vinyl Days" contains a sample of Charles Bernstein's "Dinner Source".
- "I Guess I Love It" contains a sample of Tom Nehl's "Clean Air".

== Charts ==
Chart performance for Vinyl Days
Chart (2022)	Peak position
Canadian Albums (Billboard)	30
Swiss Albums (Schweizer Hitparade)	78
UK R&B Albums (Official Charts)	20
US Billboard 200	12
US Top R&B/Hip-Hop Albums (Billboard)	6
