= Conrad O. Johnson =

Conrad Oberon Johnson (November 15, 1915 – February 3, 2008) was an American music educator, long associated with the city of Houston, who was inducted into the Texas Bandmasters Hall of Fame in 2000.

Born in Victoria, Texas, Conrad Johnson was nine when his family moved to Houston. Following studies at Yates High School, he attended Houston College for Negroes and graduated from Wiley College. He was an active member of Omega Psi Phi fraternity. He started his career in music education in 1941, and following a 37-year career, retired from his position at Kashmere High School in 1978, but continued to remain active in shaping music in Houston by conducting summer programs and in-home tutoring. The Conrad O. Johnson School of Fine Arts at Kashmere High School is named after him.

Johnson was a proficient musician in his own right, and at one point, played with Count Basie. Erskine Hawkins tried to convince him to join his orchestra, but Johnson declined, citing a love of teaching and obligations to his family. Later, Johnson made his lasting contribution to music by forming the Kashmere Stage Band, a renowned school orchestra that won a number of awards during its decade-long run.

Conrad O. Johnson died in Houston days after his former students staged a celebration in his honor. The gala Saturday-night concert, which was filmed by a documentary crew, was described by the students as "the greatest 92nd birthday gift that he could have ever requested."
