= Back from the Brink: Pre-Revolution Psychedelic Rock from Iran: 1973–1979 =

Compilation album by Kourosh Yaghmaei
- Released: 22 August 2011
- Genres: Folk; funk; psychedelic rock
- Length: 2:08:02
- Label: Now-Again Records
- Producers: Kourosh Yaghmaei; Egon

Kourosh Yaghmaei chronology
50 Golden Songs of Giti (2004)	Back from the Brink: Pre-Revolution Psychedelic Rock from Iran: 1973–1979 (2011)	Happy Birthday (Joyful songs for Children) (2012)

Back from the Brink: Pre-Revolution Psychedelic Rock from Iran: 1973–1979 is a 2-CD/3-LP compilation album of Iranian songwriter, singer, and composer Kourosh Yaghmaei's solo material, released in 2011. It is a compilation of Yaghmaei's best-known numbers, recorded between 1973 and 1979, before the Islamic Revolution. The original sessions were produced by Kourosh Yaghmaei, while this anthology was produced by Egon for his Now-Again Records label.

== Track list ==
=== CD version ===
Disc One
No.	Title	Lyrics	Music	Original album	Length
1.	"Gol-e Yakh" (Winter Sweet)	Mehdi Akhavan Langroodi	Mehdi Akhavan Langroodi, Kourosh Yaghmaei	Gol-e Yakh (1973)	5:06
2.	"Dar Enteha" (At the End)	Hakim Omar Khayyam	Mehdi Akhavan Langroodi, Kourosh Yaghmaei		4:09
3.	"Hajme Khali" (Empty Bulk)	Mehdi Akhavan Langroodi	Mehdi Akhavan Langroodi, Kourosh Yaghmaei		2:42
4.	"Paiz" (Autumn)	Mani Motiee	Mani Motiee, Kourosh Yaghmaei	Gol-e Yakh (1973)	4:20
5.	"Leila"		Kourosh Yaghmaei	Gol-e Yakh (1973)	4:27
6.	"Del Dareh Pir Misheh" (My Heart is Getting Old)	Mehdi Akhavan Langroodi	Mehdi Akhavan Langroodi, Kourosh Yaghmaei	Gol-e Yakh (1973)	2:53
7.	"Akhm Nakon" (Don't Frown)	Mehdi Akhavan Langroodi	Mehdi Akhavan Langroodi, Kourosh Yaghmaei		3:25
8.	"Shirin Joon" (Dear Shirin)		Kourosh Yaghmaei	Gol-e Yakh (1973)	3:31
9.	"Ghazal" (Gazelle)		Naser Mehdipoor, Kourosh Yaghmaei		5:18
10.	"Tavalode Yek Seda" (Birth of a Sound)	Aradalan Sarfaraz	Ardalan Sarfaraz, Kourosh Yaghmaei		4:22
11.	"Saghe" (Stalk)	Hossein Najafian	Hossein Najafian, Kourosh Yaghmaei		3:24
12.	"Entezar" (Waiting)		Mansour Tehrani, Kourosh Yaghmaei	Gol-e Yakh (1973)	4:22
13.	"Niyayesh" (Praise)		Naser Mehdipoor, Kourosh Yaghmaei		5:33
14.	"Saraabe Toe" (Your Mirage)		Moeeni Kermanshahi, Kourosh Yaghmaei	Gol-e Yakh (1973)	4:34
15.	"Reyhan"		Kourosh Yaghmaei	Gol-e Yakh (1973)	3:48
16.	"Baroona" (Rains)	Hossein Bigham	Hossein Bigham, Kourosh Yaghmaei		4:27

Disc Two
No.	Title	Lyrics	Music	Original album	Length
1.	"Mosafere Shahre Baran" (The Traveler Of Rain-Town)	Hossein Najafian	Hossein Najafian, Kourosh Yaghmaei	Gol-e Yakh (1973)	6:01
2.	"Khaar" (Thistle)	Mani Motiee	Mani Motiee, Kourosh Yaghmaei	Gol-e Yakh (1973)	6:48
3.	"Havar Havar" (Shout Shout)		Kourosh Yaghmaei	Gol-e Yakh (1973)	3:45
4.	"Ashiooneh" (Nest)		Naser Mehdipoor, Kourosh Yaghmaei		4:35
5.	"Bachehaye Khoobe Koocheh" (The Good Children of the Street)	Hossein Bigham	Hossein Bigham, Kourosh Yaghmaei		3:39
6.	"Akhtare Asemanha" (The Star of the Sky)		Mani Motiee, Kourosh Yaghmaei		4:01
7.	"Tak Derakht" (Single Tree)		Naser Mehdipoor, Kourosh Yaghmaei		5:05
8.	"Share Cheshmat" (The City of Your Eyes)		Mehdi Akhavan Langroodi, Kourosh Yaghmaei		4:19
9.	"Dokhtare Delkhasteye Shahr" (The Heartbroken Town Girl)		Hossein Bigham, Kourosh Yaghmaei		4:49
10.	"Daas" (Scythe)		Naser Mehdipoor, Kourosh Yaghmaei		5:07
11.	"Ghahr" (Sulk)		Hossein Najafian, Kourosh Yaghmaei		2:51
12.	"Aabere Shab" (Night Passenger)		Hossein Bigham, Kamran Yaghmaei		3:56
13.	"Ghad Boland" (Tall)		Kourosh Yaghmaei		3:12
14.	"Kei Toe Miayee" (When Will You Come)		Hossein Najafian, Kourosh Yaghmaei		3:34

=== Vinyl version ===
Side A
No.	Title	Lyrics	Music	Original album	Length
1.	"Gole Yakh" (Winter Sweet)	Mehdi Akhavan Langroodi	Mehdi Akhavan Langroodi, Kourosh Yaghmaei	Gol-e Yakh (1973)	5:06
2.	"Dar Enteha" (At The End)	Hakim Omar Khayyam	Mehdi Akhavan Langroodi, Kourosh Yaghmaei		4:09
3.	"Hajme Khali" (Empty Bulk)	Mehdi Akhavan Langroodi	Mehdi Akhavan Langroodi, Kourosh Yaghmaei		2:42
4.	"Paiz" (Autumn)	Mani Motiee	Mani Motiee, Kourosh Yaghmaei	Gol-e Yakh (1973)	4:20

Side B
No.	Title	Lyrics	Music	Original album	Length
1.	"Leila"		Kourosh Yaghmaei	Gol-e Yakh (1973)	4:27
2.	"Del Dareh Pir Misheh" (My Heart is Getting Old)	Mehdi Akhavan Langroodi	Mehdi Akhavan Langroodi, Kourosh Yaghmaei	Gol-e Yakh (1973)	2:53
3.	"Akhm Nakon" (Don't Frown)	Mehdi Akhavan Langroodi	Mehdi Akhavan Langroodi, Kourosh Yaghmaei		3:25
4.	"Shirin Joon" (Dear Shirin)		Kourosh Yaghmaei	Gol-e Yakh (1973)	3:31

Side C
No.	Title	Lyrics	Music	Original album	Length
1.	"Ghazal" (Gazelle)		Naser Mehdipoor, Kourosh Yaghmaei		5:18
2.	"Tavalode Yek Seda" (Birth of a Sound)	Aradalan Sarfaraz	Ardalan Sarfaraz, Kourosh Yaghmaei		4:22
3.	"Mosafere Shahre Baran" (The Traveler Of Rain-Town)	Hossein Najafian	Hossein Najafian, Kourosh Yaghmaei	Gol-e Yakh (1973)	6:01

Side D
No.	Title	Lyrics	Music	Original album	Length
1.	"Saghe"	Hossein Najafian	Hossein Najafian, Kourosh Yaghmaei		3:24
2.	"Entezar" (Waiting)		Mansour Tehrani, Kourosh Yaghmaei	Gol-e Yakh (1973)	4:22
3.	"Niyayesh" (Praise)		Naser Mehdipoor, Kourosh Yaghmaei		5:33
11.	Untitled (Stalk)

Side E
No.	Title	Lyrics	Music	Original album	Length
1.	"Saraabe Toe" (Your Mirage)		Moeeni Kermanshahi, Kourosh Yaghmaei	Gol-e Yakh (1973)	4:34
2.	"Reyhan"		Kourosh Yaghmaei	Gol-e Yakh (1973)	3:48
3.	"Baroona" (Rains)	Hossein Bigham	Hossein Bigham, Kourosh Yaghmaei		4:27

Side F
No.	Title	Lyrics	Music	Original album	Length
1.	"Khaar" (Thistle)	Mani Motiee	Mani Motiee, Kourosh Yaghmaei	Gol-e Yakh (1973)	6:48
2.	"Havar Havar" (Shout Shout)		Kourosh Yaghmaei	Gol-e Yakh (1973)	3:45
3.	"Ashiooneh" (Nest)		Naser Mehdipoor, Kourosh Yaghmaei		4:35
4.	"Bachehaye Khoobe Koocheh" (The Good Children of the Street)	Hossein Bigham	Hossein Bigham, Kourosh Yaghmaei		3:39

== Personnel ==
=== Musicians ===
- Kourosh Yaghmaei – lead vocals; rhythm and acoustic guitars
- Behrooz Soori – bass guitar (A1, A2, A3, B2)
- Charlise Bet Davood – bass (B1)
- Fereydoon Farhoodi – bass (B4, D2, E1, F1)
- Kamran Yaghmaei – electric guitar (all but A4, B1, C3, D2, E3, F2, F4); rhythm guitar (B2, F2); acoustic guitar (C3); backing vocals (B1, C2, D3, E1, E3, F2); drums (A4, C3, F4)
- Farokh Hejazi – drums (A1, A2, A3, B2)
- Changiz Farjad – drums (B3, C1, C2, D1, D3, E1, E2, F1, F2, F3)
- Bardia – congas (F2); drums (D2)
- Behrooz Partovi – drums (E3)
- Houman Darioush – piano (A1)
- Siavash Ghomayshi – piano (A4)
- Mehrzad – keyboards (A2, A3, B2)
- Farhad – keyboards (B3)
- Fariborz Akhgar – keyboards (B4, D2, E1, F2)
- Behzad – congas (B3)
- Jamshid Sobhani – backing vocals (B1, E1), harmonica (F1)
- Yousuf Abgoun – backing vocals (E2)
- Amir Beheshti – trumpet (F4)
- Mirdadian – trumpet (F4)

=== Others ===
- Arranged by – Kambiz Yaghmaei (tracks: F4), Kourosh Yaghmaei (tracks: A1 to F3)
- Errol F. Richardson – art direction
