= Chaalis Chauraasi =

- Theatrical release poster
- Directed by: Hriday Shetty
- Written by: Yash Keshwani; Vinay Kamath
- Produced by: Sachin Awasthee; Uday Shetty; Anuya Mhaiskar
- Starring: Naseeruddin Shah; Kay Kay Menon; Atul Kulkarni; Ravi Kissen; Manoj Pahwa
- Cinematography: Najeeb Khan
- Edited by: Vincent Fernandez
- Music by: Lalit Pandit & Vishal Rajan
- Release date: 13 January 2012
- Language: Hindi
- Budget: 13.75 crore

Chaalis Chauraasi (transl. Forty eighty-four), is a 2012 Indian Hindi-language crime comedy film directed by Hriday Shetty and starring Naseeruddin Shah, Atul Kulkarni, Kay Kay Menon and Ravi Kishan. Most of the film was shot in Mumbai. It was released on 13 January 2012.

== Cast ==
- Naseeruddin Shah as Pankaj Purushottam Suri (Sir)
- Kay Kay Menon as Albert Pinto a.k.a. Pinto
- Atul Kulkarni as Bhaskar Sardesai a.k.a. Bobby
- Ravi Kishan as Shakti Chinappa a.k.a. Shakti
- Rupsha Guha
- Rajesh Sharma as Mahesh Naik
- Shweta Bhardwaj as Madhu, also appears in the song 'Setting Zala'
- Zakir Hussain as Tony Bisleri
- Manoj Pahwa as Tilak Shetty
- Arbaaz Ali Khan
- Yuri Suri as Haryanvi Shethi a.k.a. Tau
- Jeet Upendra
- Neelima Uttarwar as Gauri Shetty, wife of Tilak
- D. Santosh as Chandu
- Shital Kohok as bar male singer
- Rupsha Guha as bride
- Shuvendru Sood as groom
- Yashshree Gupta as receptionist, Ad agency
- Partha Akerkar as Vivek, Creative Head, Ad agency
- Jahangir Karkaria as old Parsi man
- Nargis Dastoor as old Parsi woman
- Navin Talreja as Husband (HC; Happy couple)
- Sonal Joshi as Wife (HC; Happy couple)
- Sagar Juneja as Parsi son
- Virendra Pandey as watchman in Parsis's bungalow
- Chandrakant Dani as Ambulance attendant
- Birendra Gupta as Tilak Shetty's accountant
- Digvijay Rohidas as Inspector Kalsekar
- Jageshwar as Hanif
- Amruta Sant as Hanif's girlfriend
- Sadat Shamshi as Hotel Dwarka receptionist
- Vinay Apte as Sheikh saab
- Reetu Jain as 'Badmast' item girl

== Reception ==
=== Box office ===
In its first weekend, the film netted around 1.75 crore.

=== Critical response ===
Mayank Shekhar from Hindustan Times gave the film three stars out of five, writing, "This one manages to for most of the while. A sense of fun is never lost. It’s the actors, no doubt, who make the ridiculous believable. Hence, you truly enjoy this ride for most of the part. Which is saying a lot." Conversely, Taran Adarsh from Bollywood Hungama gave the film 2 stars out of 5, noting that while it had an attention-grabbing premise and some truly wonderful scenes, the writing lacked the energy and dynamism to keep the viewer hooked, and another reason the film stumbled was the inclusion of songs in the narrative, barring Hawa Hawa. Shubhra Gupta from The Indian Express gave the film one star out of five, writing, "What we get is capable actors floundering, and a film that grows ever more incoherent and tedious as it lurches along among fellows pretending to be cops, bent policemen, mobsters hiding out in seedy hotel rooms, guns going rat-a-tat."

== Soundtrack ==
Chaalis Chauraasi (4084)

Soundtrack album by Lalit Pandit & Vishal Rajan
- Released: December 2011
- Genre: Film soundtrack
- Length: 20:29
- Label: T-Series

The songs of the film were composed by Lalit Pandit whereas the title song was sung and composed by Vishal Rajan. The music rights were sold to T-Series and released in December 2011. The rights of the song "Hawa Hawa" were acquired from Pakistani Singer Hasan Jahangir. The film song was sung in two versions, originally sung by Hasan Jahangir. The background score was composed by Sanjoy Chowdhury.

Track listing
No.	Title	Lyrics	Singer(s)	Length
1.	"Setting Zaala"	Sandeep Shrivastav	Sonu Nigam, Amit Kumar, Yashita Yashpal	5:07
2.	"Badmast"	Kashinath Kashyap	Daler Mehndi, Mamta Sharma	5:09
3.	"Hawa Hawa (Remix)"	Hasan Jahangir	Hasan Jahangir, Neeraj Shridhar, Amitabh Narayan, Aniruddh	3:23
4.	"Chaalis Chauraasi (4084) (Theme)"		Vishal Rajan Lyrics and music: Vishal Rajan	3:25
5.	"Hawa Hawa (Original)"		Hasan Jahangir Lyrics: Hasan Jahangir	3:23
Total length:				20:29
