= Now-Again Records =

Subsidiary of Stones Throw Records

Now-Again
- Parent company: Stones Throw Records (former; 2002–early 2010s)
- Founded: 2002
- Founder: Eothen "Egon" Alapatt
- Distributor: Traffic Entertainment Group
- Genre: World; funk; psychedelia; afrobeat
- Country of origin: United States
- Location: Los Angeles
- Official website: www.nowagainrecords.com

Now-Again Records is a Los Angeles–based music imprint that specializes in reissues and compilations of funk, soul, and psychedelic rock from the 1960s to the 1980s. Founded in 2002 by Eothen "Egon" Alapatt as a subsidiary of Stones Throw Records, the organization has since grown into an independent label with a vast global catalog and its own roster of contemporary artists.

== History ==
Now-Again was founded in 2002 by Eothen Alapatt, then-General Manager of Stones Throw Records. The imprint was originally founded to reissue American funk and soul music following the success of Stones Throw's first anthology, The Funky 16 Corners, which had been compiled by Egon the year prior. These efforts included releasing music by artists like the L.A. Carnival, Ebony Rhythm Band, Kashmere Stage Band, and Amnesty.

In the late 2000s, Now-Again embraced a global perspective and began also reissuing music and compiling anthologies featuring the 1970s-era musical scenes of countries like India (Atomic Forest), Indonesia, Zambia (WITCH, Ngozi Family, Amanaz), Zimbabwe, Ethiopia (Ayalew Mesfin), Nigeria, and Iran (Kourosh Yaghmaei). Their compilations are complemented by independent research.

Music from the Now-Again catalog is often sampled, in part due to their straightforward sample clearance procedure and curated libraries. Kanye West has sampled the Now-Again catalog; songs by Beyoncé and Janet Jackson have also sampled their reissues.

Now-Again incorporated in 2010 and is partners with music retailer Rappcats and label Madlib Invazion. Alapatt left Stones Throw in 2011 to focus on Now-Again, among other ventures.

In early 2022, Alapatt sent Logic the entire Now-Again Records catalog to provide samples for his seventh and final album on Def Jam Recordings, entitled Vinyl Days. From January 11 to January 20, 2022, Egon worked with Logic on the album’s production. The album was released on June 17, 2022. As a result, he is prominently featured in Logic’s documentary on the album.

== Roster ==
=== Contemporary performers ===
- Breakestra
- Connie Price and the Keystones
- Dimlite (Switzerland)
- Eamon
- Fabiano do Nascimento / Triorganico (Brazil)
- The Heliocentrics (United Kingdom)
- Karl Hector and The Malcouns (Germany)
- Mr. Chop (United Kingdom)
- Myron & E
- Natural Yogurt Band (United Kingdom)
- Paul White (United Kingdom)
- Savath and Savalas
- Seu Jorge and Almaz (Brazil)
- Whitefield Brothers
- Rodinia (Germany)

The Gaslamp Killer and Melvin Van Peebles have also released music on Now-Again in collaboration with Heliocentrics. Hip hop and electronic artists Cook Classics, Cut Chemist, J Rocc, Kenny Dope, Koushik, Maker, Oh No, and Percee P have all released remix albums on the label.

=== Reissue performers ===
This list is likely incomplete.

- 4th Coming
- Amanaz (Zambia)
- Amnesty
- Apple and the Three Oranges
- Aristocrats
- Ayalew Mesfin (Ethiopia)
- The Black Seeds
- Atomic Forest (India)
- Carleen and the Groovers
- Darling Dears & Funky Heavy
- Damon
- David Axelrod
- Detroit Sex Machine
- Diplomatics
- East of the Underground
- Ebony Rhythm Band
- The Equatics
- Fabulous Souls
- German Oak (Germany)
- Heitkotter
- Isaac Hayes
- James Brown
- James Reese and the Progressions
- The J.B.'s
- Kaleidoscope (Puerto Rico)
- Kashmere Stage Band
- Key & Cleary
- Kourosh Yaghmaei (Iran)
- LA Carnival
- Leon Mitchison and the Eastex Freeway Band
- The Lightmen
- Lil' Lavair and the Fabulous Jades
- Mark III
- Mark Fry (United Kingdom)
- Michael Cosmic / Phill Musra Group
- Michael Liggins and The Supersouls
- Music Makers Band
- New World Generation
- Ngozi Family / Paul Ngozi (Zambia)
- Paternoster (Austria)
- Phil Hewitt / P.E. Hewitt Jazz Ensemble
- Peace (Zambia)
- Question Mark (Nigeria)
- Ray Alexander Technique
- Regional Garland
- Rhythm Machine
- Richard Marks
- Rikki Ililonga / Musi-O-Tunya (Zambia)
- Rob Thomsett (Australia)
- SOAP
- Soul Seven
- The Sound Trek
- Split Decision Band
- Stark Reality
- Timothy McNealy
- Tirogo (Nigeria)
- Wells Fargo (Zimbabwe)
- Whitefield Brothers (Germany)
- Willie Bobo
- WITCH (Zambia)
- World's Experience Orchestra

== Catalog ==
=== Compilations ===
American regional music anthologies

- South Dallas Pop Fest 1970 (2003)
- Midwest Funk: Funk 45s From Tornado Alley (2005)
- Cold Heat: Heavy Funk Rarities, 1968–1974 Vol 1. (2005)
- Texas Funk: Black Gold From The Lone Star State, 1968–1975 (2006)
- Carolina Funk: First in Funk, 1968–1977 (2008)
- Florida Funk: Funk 45s From The Alligator State, 1968–1975 (2008)
- Spiritual Jazz: Esoteric, Modal + Deep Jazz from the Underground, 1968–77 (2009)
- Forge Your Own Chains: Heavy Psychedelic Ballads and Dirges, 1968–1974 (2009)
- California Funk: Rare Funk 45s From the Golden State (2010)
- True Soul: Deep Sounds from the Left of Stax Vols. 1-2 (2011)
- Original Raw Soul III (2011)
- Soul Cal: Funky Disco & Modern Soul, 1971–82 (2012)
- Soul 7 (2012)
- Enjoy The Experience: Homemade Records, 1958–1992 (2012; with Sinecure Books)
- Loving on the Flip Side: Sweet Funk and Beat-Heavy Ballads, 1969–1977 (2012)
- Function Underground: The Black and Brown American Rock Sound, 1969–1974 (2016)
- LAMP Records – It Glowed Like The Sun: The Story of Naptown’s Motown, 1969–1972 (2019)

Global music anthologies

- Black Man's Cry: The Inspiration of Fela Kuti (2009)
- Those Shocking Shaking Days: Indonesian Hard, Psychedelic, Progressive Rock and Funk, 1970–1978 (2010)
- Kouroush Yaghmel – Back from the Brink: Pre-Revolution Psychedelic Rock from Iran, 1973–1979 (2011)
- Christophe Lemaire and Now-Again Present: Where Are You From? Global Psychedelic Rock, Funk, and Rare Grooves (2011)
- Christophe Lemaire and Now-Again Present: Can’t You Hear Me – African Nuggets & Garage Rock from Nigeria, Zambia, and Zimbabwe (2016)
- Wake Up You! The Rise and Fall of Nigerian Rock, 1972–1977 Vols. 1 & 2 (2016)
- Power to the People! A Survey of Zimbabwe's 70s Revolution Rock Scene (2016)
- Welcome to Zamrock! How Zambia's Liberation Led to a Rock Revolution, 1972–1977 Vols. 1 & 2 (2016)

Label compilations

- Now-Again on Wax (2005)
- Science Class: Heavy Funk + Raw Disco Soul (2008) (promotional release with Soul-Cal)
- Now-Again Re:Sounds Vol. 1 (2008)
- Art Class: Masterpieces from the Soul-Cal & Now-Again Catalogs (2008) (promotional release with Soul-Cal)
