= Kourosh Yaghmaei =

Iranian singer (born 1946)

- کوروش یغمایی
- Yaghmaei in 1975
- Born: 3 December 1946 (age 79) (Pahlavi Iran) Shahrud, Iran
- Other names: The Godfather of Iranian Rock; The King of Rock
- Education: B.A. in Sociology (1968), National University of Iran
- Occupations: Singer-songwriter; composer; record producer; guitarist
- Years active: 1964–2025
- Notable work: Gol-e Yakh; Arayesh-e Khorshid; Back from the Brink: Pre-Revolution Psychedelic Rock from Iran: 1973–1979; Malek Jamshid
- Children: 3; including Kaveh
- Musical career
- Origin: Tehran, Iran
- Genres: Rock; Iranian rock; folk rock; psychedelic rock; progressive rock; pop; psychedelic pop
- Instruments: Vocals; electric guitar; bass; Vox Continental
- Labels: Now-Again; Stones Throw; Caltex
- Website: kourosh-yaghmaei.com

Kourosh Yaghmaei (Note: Persian: کورش یغمایی, romanized: Kuroš Yağmâi) (born 3 December 1946) is an Iranian former singer-songwriter, composer, record producer and guitarist. Regarded as one of the greatest psychedelic rock musicians in the history of Iranian rock music, he is referred to as "the Godfather of Iranian psychedelic rock", as well as the "King of Rock".

Born in 1946 in Shahrud, Yaghmaei was raised in Tehran. Most of his songs combine classical Persian poetry with more contemporary works, often incorporating his own lyrics. Musically, Yaghmaei is recognized as being an early cross-pollinator for Persian traditional music and the western psychedelic rock of the era, with artists Led Zeppelin and Pink Floyd often listed as specific influences. He began his solo career in 1973 with his first single "Gol-e Yakh" ("Ice Flower"), a track selling more than 5 million copies in the domestic market.

Much of Yaghmaei's work is well known by the Iranian diaspora, with singles "Gol-e Yakh", "Havar Havar" ("Shout Shout"), "Khaar" ("Thistle"), "Leila", "Paiz" ("Autumn"), "Reyhan" being particularly popular. In 2011, his first compilation album, Back from the Brink: Pre-Revolution Psychedelic Rock from Iran: 1973–1979, was released by Now-Again Records to international recognition. Vogue has described Yaghmaei as "a psyched singer, stylish, moustached and funky".

Following the Iranian Revolution in 1979, Yaghmaei’s music became banned from the country's airways, markets and homes, and his name from the press. In the early 1990s, Yaghmaei got permission from the Iranian government to release albums under some restrictions, such as Arayesh-e Khorshid. However, the Ministry of Culture and Islamic Guidance denied to release the album Malek Jamshid in 2016 and instead it was released Now-Again Records in U.S. but it was banned in Iran.

In December 2025, Yaghmaei announced on his Instagram page that, following the release of his final album, titled "No. 44", he would retire after a six-decade career in rock music, bringing his musical career to a permanent end. His final album will be released by Now-Again Records on digital platforms.

== Early life ==
10-year-old Kourosh performing as a guest singer at a ceremony in Hadaf High School.

Kourosh Yaghmaei was born on 3 December 1946 in Central District of Shahrud, Semnan province of Iran to a well-off Zoroastrian family. His name Kourosh, is a common Iranian male given name. He is the second oldest of four brothers; Yaghmaei's brothers Keyvan, Kamran, and Kambiz are also rock musicians. His grandfather was a landowner and one of his distant ancestors was a popular Iranian poet. The family later relocated to Tehran, where Yaghmaei studied at the National University of Iran.

Yaghmaei began playing music at the age of ten upon receiving a santur as a gift from his father. Having no music teacher, he taught himself to play traditional Iranian music for several years. When he was able to buy an instrument on his own at fifteen, he began teaching himself to play the electric guitar and became interested in Western music.

== Music career ==
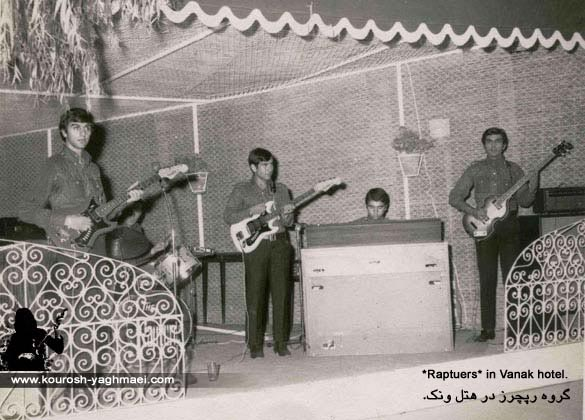
The Raptures in Vanak Hotel Tehran, 1960s.

=== 1964–1972: Working with the Raptures and solo band ===
In 1964, at the age of 18, Yaghmaei started his official career by founding and leading the instrumental rock band called "The Raptures". Inspired by listening to the vinyl records of surf-rockers like the Ventures, the Raptures covered the Ventures, the Kinks, the Beatles, and the Monkees. The 1967 lineup of the Raptures consisted of Yaghmaei (vocal, lead guitar), Bahram Saeedi (rhythm guitar), Kamran Khasheh (organ), Jahangir (bass), and Viguen (drums).

Playing his first electric guitar at the age of 17.

At the time, he was dubbed "Golden-Fingers" as a result of his exclusive dexterity in playing guitar. He also played in another group named Rebels for a while, the members of which later gradually took their own places in the Iranian rock scene. While studying at National University of Iran, he was almost always the leader and manager of the university's musical band that resulted in his university's outstanding success in the Iranian universities arts competitions, which held at Shiraz University.

Performing in the university's band, late 1960s.

During the early 1970s, Yaghmaei set up his solo band with his brothers Kamran and Kambiz. At that time he was on guitar, bass, and vocals. His music combined Iranian melodies, instrumentals, vocals, and tones with Western harmonies, scales, and modes.

Additionally, Yaghmaei distanced himself from the standards of the Iranian entertainment industry, and did not listen to commercial music. In 2009, he told interviewers: "I never molded into Iranian pop music and no one from Iranian pop music has had any influence on me."

=== 1973-1979: Height of popularity ===
==== Gol-e Yakh ====
In 1973, Yaghmaei made his debut single when he was studying in Shahid Beheshti University in Tehran. Several companies were interested in distributing the single, but record company Ahange Rooz won the bid. The song "Gol-e Yakh" was written by Mahdi Akhavan Langeroudi, who was Yaghmaei's friend at the university and one of the significant modern Persian poets. "Gol-e Yakh" penetrated beyond the borders of Iran, and thereafter various performances in other countries of the world continued to this day. The song brought Yaghmaei great fame and it was adapted for various languages. "Gol-e Yakh" was said to have sold 5 million copies in Iran, though Kourosh claims he only received 22,500 Iranian tomans, which covered only the musician and recording costs.

When you stay by me, my loneliness is swept by winds
Winter flowers grow in my heart

— Mahdi Akhavan Langeroudi, "Gol-e Yakh", 1973,

He released four singles from his contracted record company Ahange Rooz. In 1973 "Gole Yakh" / "Del Dareh Pir Misheh" and "Leila" / "Paiz", in 1974 "Hajme Khali" / "Akhm Nakon" and in 1975 "Saraabe Toe" / "Dar Enteha" was released. Despite high record sales, he earned only modest royalties. He released two albums before being banned, both of which are important works of Iranian rock history. Between 1975 and 1979, Yaghmaei recorded 24 songs in total. 17 of those songs were collected in two albums named Hajm-e Khali (1975) and Sārāb-e Toe (1977) released on cassettes. The remaining 7 songs were recorded in the pre-revolution riot period between 1978 and 1979.

==== Islamic Revolution ====
Yaghmaei performed on radio and television in Iran until the late 1970s. Following the Islamic Revolution of 1979, the newly-formed Islamic Republic prioritized the rooting out of Western influence in Iran and began banning the music of many Iranian artists, including that of Yaghmaei. Government authorities swiftly shut down his music, barring him from releasing records or performing live. As he was no longer allowed to sing and perform publicly in Iran, Yaghmaei's career suffered profoundly, and aside from a few concerts in Sweden and Norway in 1993, he did not perform much outside the country. Spurred by the regime's ever-increasing pressure on music immediately following the revolution, Yaghmaei spent over a month recording albums Sol-e 1 (1979, reissued on CD as Parandeye Mohajer by Los Angeles-based record label Caltex Records), Sol-e 2 (1980, recorded with Fereydoon Forooghi) and Sol-e 3, which was renamed to Arayesh-E Khorshid for its release in 2000, According to Kevan Harris, a lecturer from the University of California, the government after the Islamic revolution were very motivated to stop the impacts of Western and European culture, and therefore it was convinced to diminish musicians like Kourosh. Although many musicians immigrated to cities like Los Angeles, Montreal, Paris and other European countries where exile communities were settled, Yaghmaei preferred to stay in Iran for his principles. He said:

I believed that if I had changed my career it would be an unrespectful behaviour to my music and myself and also it would mean betrayal to my cultural roots. Now that I look back, I am glad I did not bribe anyone or bow to pressures, but lived all these 37 years with honour. I believe even in an unequal battle, resistance is preferred to giving up.

— Yaghmaei, in From National Star to Enemy of the State, Vice, May 2016

=== 1980–2025: Post revolution ===
After the Islamic Revolution, Yaghmaei was banned from performing for 17 years. During this time he worked for children and published books and cassettes. In 1987, he released his fourth solo instrumental album Diar which was recorded without bass, guitar and drums, as dictated by the Iranian government. In addition, Yaghmaei arranged folkloric pieces to be played by the Great National Orchestra.

In the early 1990s, Yaghmaei got permission from the Iranian government to release albums under some restrictions. He released studio album Gorg haye Ghorosneh in 1990. Caltex Records titled his "best of the 1970s" as "Gole Yakh" released in 1991. During 1993, the restrictions became looser and Kourosh got permission to perform concerts in Norway and Sweden. In 1994 he released studio album Sib-e Noghreii (The Silver Apple), on which the regime would not let him publish his portrait as an artwork, therefore the album cover was only graphic arts. In 1996 Mah va Palang and in 1997 Kabous was released. In the early 2000s, Yaghmaei released two solo albums Arayesh-E Khorshid (2000), which primarily recorded as Sol-e 3 was censored one track before released and Tofang-e daste Noghre (2001), was the last album that was legally published in Iran.

==== Malek Jamshid and other albums ====
Between 2003 and 2006, Yaghmaei worked with his last studio album titled Malek Jamshid. After 12 years of trying to obtain the required permit from the Ministry of Culture and Islamic Guidance, the authority denied to release this album in Iran. Later in 2016, since two years of restriction not to use types of equipment such as acoustic system, sound engineering, professional microphones, amplifiers, Roland keyboard, electric guitar, 8 track recorder and other necessary equipment, the album was released by Now-Again in United States and the album was banned by the Iranian government.

He released debut compilation Back from the Brink: Pre-Revolution Psychedelic Rock from Iran: 1973–1979 in 2011. A two-disc celebration of Yaghmaei's most well-known numbers, recorded between 1973 and 1979, before the Islamic Revolution.

On 6 December 2025, Yaghmaei announced that after the release of his final album Plaque 44, he would retire from his musical career.‌ The album was released later that month and he retired from his musical career.

== Musical style ==
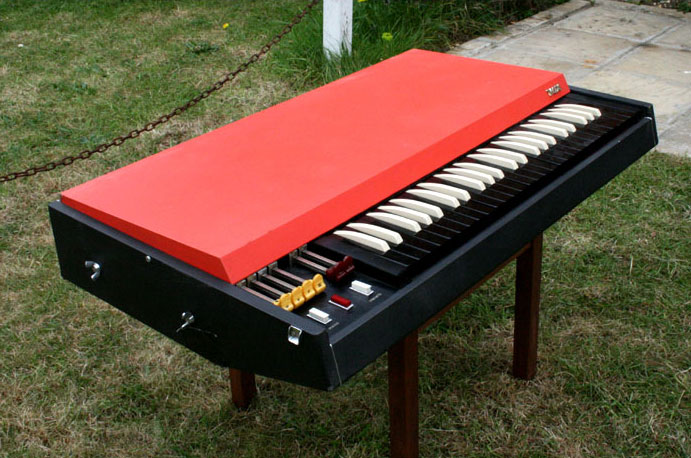
Most of Yaghmaei's works used the Vox Continental.

Yaghmaei has unique Iranian style of psychedelic rock and blues-rock music. He brought a lot of innovation to Iranian rock, using the keyboard as the rhythm of the song instead of the guitar is part of this innovation. Such as describing a melancholic picture, blues riffs, strings and analog synthesizer sounds make a feeling that settles in the heart. As the songs are about six to eight minutes long, many progressive movements could easily be a part of the music. According to Iranian writer Ebrahim Nabavi, "Yaghmaei has had a profound impact on psychedelic rock in Iran." Yaghmaei is known as the father of Iranian rock music because of his deep influence on Iranian rock music. "He was one of the people who was doing the Western-Eastern kind of hybrid music the right way," says Ashkan Kooshanejad, a British-Iranian composer.

== Personal life ==
Yaghmaei has two sons, Kaveh Yaghmaei, also a musician, who lives in Vancouver, Canada; and Kamil Yaghmaei. He has a daughter named Satgin Yaghmaei. Due to his records being under heavy censorship in Iran, Kourosh now runs a private music school and studio in Tehran.

== Discography ==
=== Studio albums ===
- Hajm-e Khali (1975)
- Sarab-e To (1977)
- Diar (1987)
- Gorg haye Ghorosneh (1990)
- Sib-e Noghreii (The Silver Apple) (1994)
- Mah va Palang (1996)
- Parandeye Mohajer (1996)
- Kabous (Nightmare) (1997)
- Arayesh-e Khorshid (2000)
- Tofang-e daste Noghre (2001)
- Malek Jamshid (2016)
- Rebel (2024)

=== Live ===
- Sol-e 1 (1979)
- Sol-e 2 (1980)

=== Compilation ===
- Back from the Brink: Pre-Revolution Psychedelic Rock from Iran: 1973–1979 (2011)
- Happy Birthday (Joyful songs for Children) (2012)

=== Collaborative ===
- 50 Golden Songs of Giti, Afshin, Kourosh Yaghmaee & Fereydoon Farrokhzad – Persian Music (2004)

=== Singles ===
- "Gol-e Yakh" / "Del Dareh Pir Misheh" ("My Heart is Getting Old") (1973)
- "Khaar" ("Thistle") (1973)
- "Leila" / "Paiz" ("Autumn") (1974)
- "Sarab-e To" ("Your Mirage") / "Dar Enteha" ("At The End") (1977)
- "Hajm-e Khali" ("Empty Bulk") (1975)
- "Akhm Nakon" ("Don't Frown") (1975)
- "Eshghe Iran" ("Iran's Love") (1977)
- "Zadeye Mehr" ("Born to Kindness")(1997)
- "Ghahre Afyoun" (2012)
- "Vatan" ("Birth Country" "Iran") (2012)
- "Faaje-e" ("Crisis") (2013)
- "Kaabous" ("Nightmare") (1997)
- "Nowrouz ("Iranian New Year)" (2016)
- "Asmar Asmar" (2016)
- "Pedar" ("Father")
- "Shabe Yalda" ("Longest night of the year")
- "Nedamatgah" ("Jail")
- "Panjerei Roo Be Sobh" ("A Window Opens Toward Morning")
- "Marde Khakestari" ("A Gray Man" aka "Old Man")

== Filmography ==
Kourosh Yaghmaei also composed several film scores, starting in 1991, with Gorghaye Gorosneh.

Title	Year	Role	Notes
Gorghaye Gorosneh	1991	Composer	Directed by Siroos Moghaddam
Independent Lens	2009	Music Performer	TV series (1999–present)
Appropriate Behavior	2014	Writer	Song "Gole Yakh", directed by Desiree Akhavan
Nuit chérie	2018	Music	Directed by Lia Bertels

== In popular culture ==
Vice Principals is an American comedy television series that in season 1, episode 4 called "Run for the Money" when Gamby and Russell experience psychedelic drugs on themselves when Russell tried to sabotage the football game, the background music plays the song "Saraabe Toe”. The song "Sarab-e To" can also be heard in the 2014 American horror comedy film Summer of Blood.

Yaghmaei's songs have been sampled on several albums by various artists. His 1974 single "Gol-e Yakh" about disappearing youth is sampled in "Adam and Eve" on 2018 album Nasir by American rapper Nas.

In 1989, Hindi song "Haa Bhai Haa Mai Hu Jawaan" performed by Anuradha Paudwal and Amit Kumar from the film Toofan directed by Ketan Desai was inspired from Yaghmaei's song "Havar Havar". Pakistani singer Hasan Jahangir had copied to come out with "Hava Hava" in his album "Hava Hava". This song was remade in a Hindi movie Aag Ka Gola as "Aaya Aaya Woh Aaya Yaar Mera Aaya Re" by music composer Bappi Lahiri. This song was also remade in another Hindi movie Billoo Badshah as "Jawan Jawan Ishq Jawan Hai" by music composer Jagjit Singh.

Gol-e Yakh was also featured in "The Rock" episode of the Apple TV+ series Little America, which focused on the immigrant life of an Iranian family living in New York.

'Leila' was featured as the closing song in Sasha Nathwani's coming-of-age 2024 drama Last Swim, depicting a young British-Iranian girl, Ziba, on A-Level results day.

== See also ==
- List of Iranian musicians
