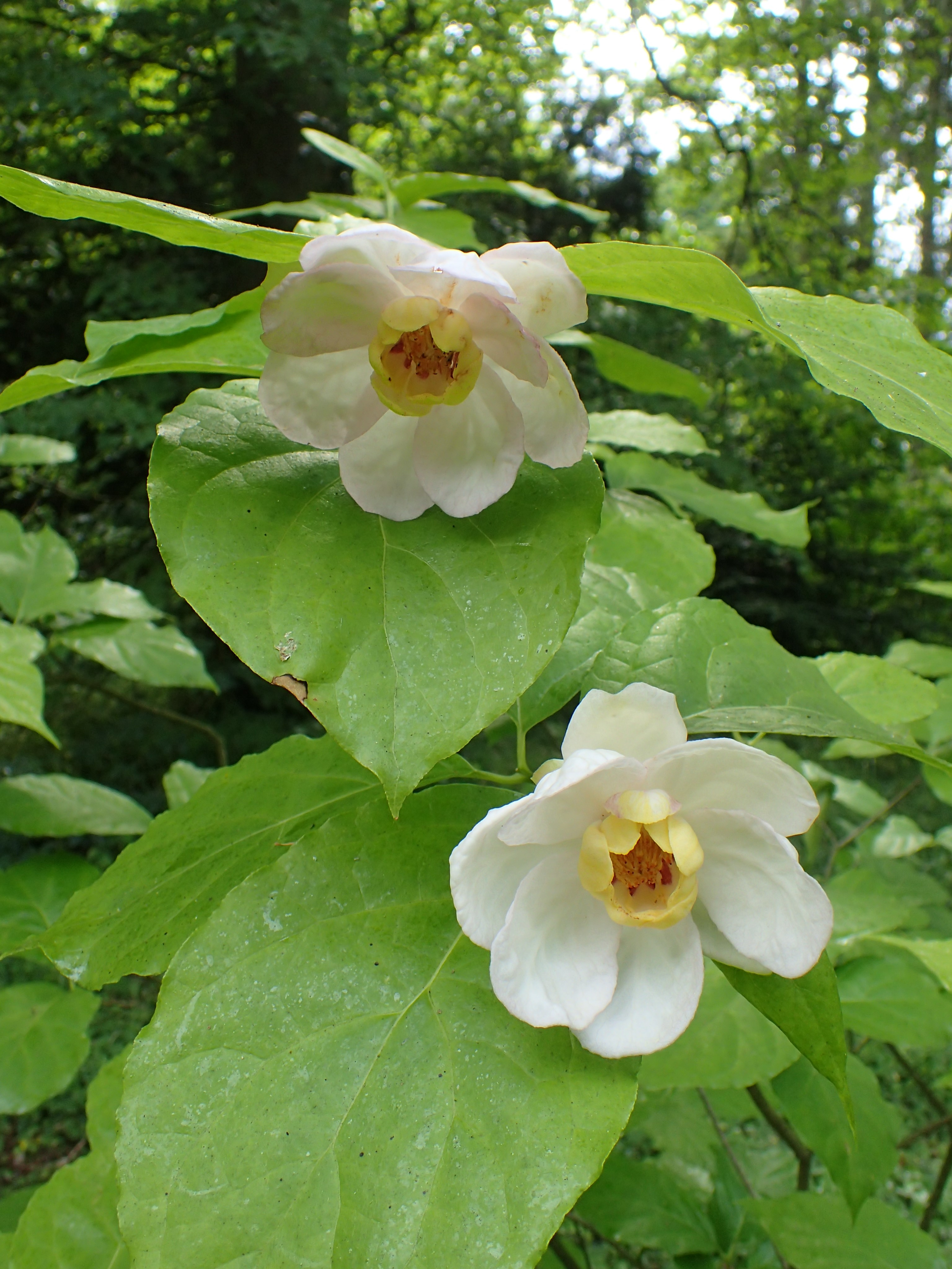

Scientific classification
- Kingdom: Plantae
- Clade: Tracheophytes
- Clade: Angiosperms
- Clade: Magnoliids
- Order: Laurales
- Family: Calycanthaceae
- Genus: Calycanthus
- Species: C. chinensis

Binomial name
- Calycanthus chinensis (W.C.Cheng & S.Y.Chang) W.C.Cheng & S.Y.Chang ex P.T.Li

Synonyms
- Calycanthus chinensis W.C.Cheng & S.Y.Chang, nom. illegit.; Sinocalycanthus chinensis W.C.Cheng & S.Y.Chang

= Calycanthus chinensis =

Species of flowering plant

Calycanthus chinensis, known as Chinese sweetshrub, is a species of flowering plant in the family Calycanthaceae, native to Southeast China. It was first given a valid scientific name in 1964. It is cultivated as an ornamental flowering shrub, and has been hybridized with two other species in the genus Calycanthus to combine its larger and broader tepalled flowers with their scented and more colourful ones.

It has been treated as the only species in the genus Sinocalycanthus.

== Description ==
Calycanthus chinensis is a deciduous shrub or small tree up to 3 m (10 ft) high and the same across. Older twigs are hairless and have greyish or greyish-brown bark. The leaves are aromatic and arranged in an opposite fashion. The leaf petiole (stalk) is about 12–18 mm (0.5–0.7 in) long. The leaf blade is variable in shape but broadly ovate, 11–18 cm (4.3–7.1 in) long by 8–15 cm (3.1–5.9 in) wide. The base of the leaf petiole hides the lateral buds.

In its original habitat in China, it flowers in May. The nodding flowers are terminal, about 4.5–10 cm (1.8–3.9 in) across, and borne singly on a short pedicel 20–45 mm (0.8–1.8 in) long. There is no clear distinction into sepals and petals. There are about 10–14 white outer tepals, often flushed pink, especially as they age, and about 7–16 yellowish inner tepals, with purple marks near the base. The inner tepals are shorter and thicker than the outer ones, and curve inwards. The fruit matures in October in the wild. It is ovoid, with a spiral of marks at the top showing the former position of the tepals. The seeds are achenes, about 10–12 mm (0.4–0.5 in) long, and have silky hairs.

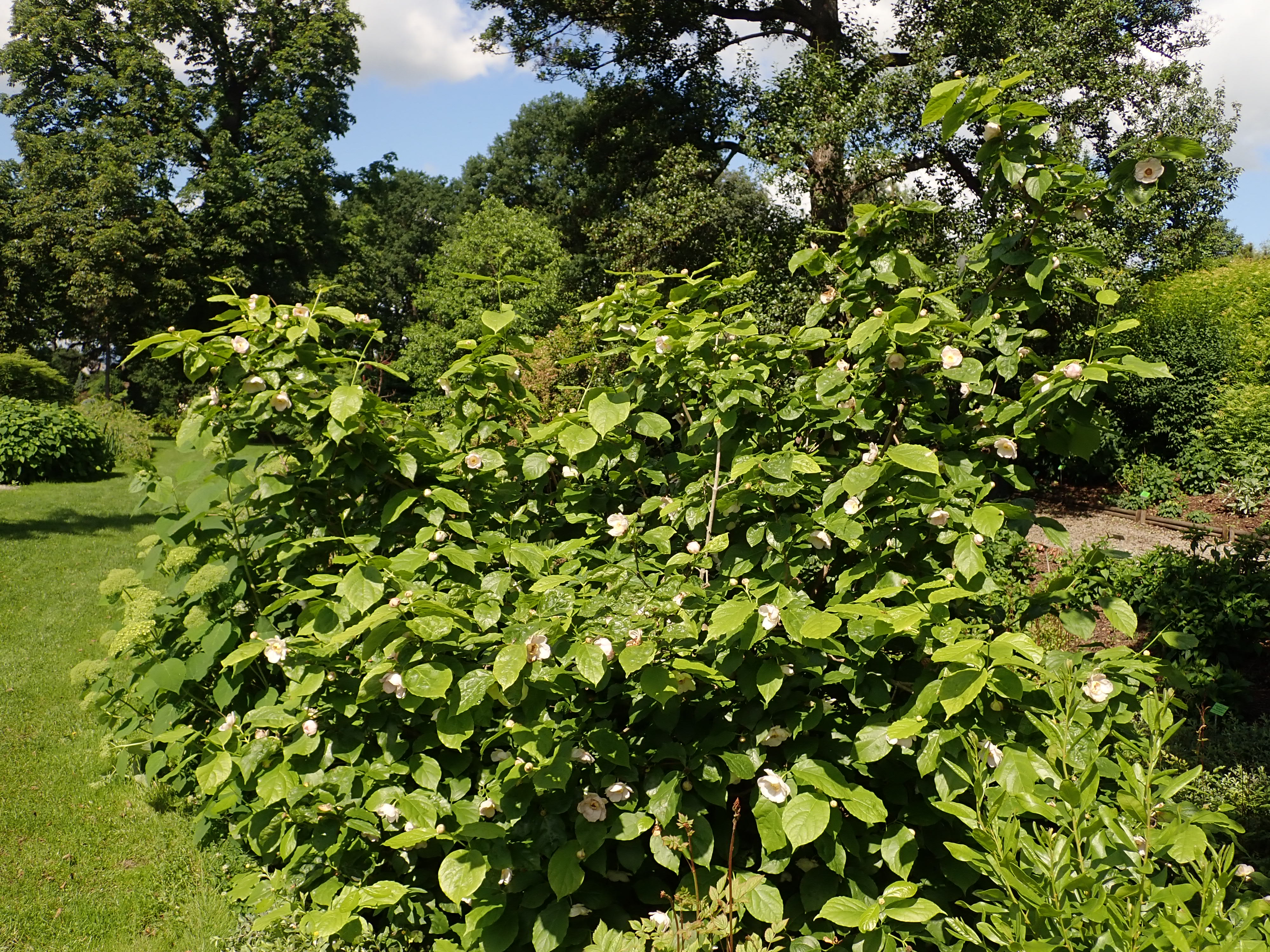
Habit in cultivation in Poland

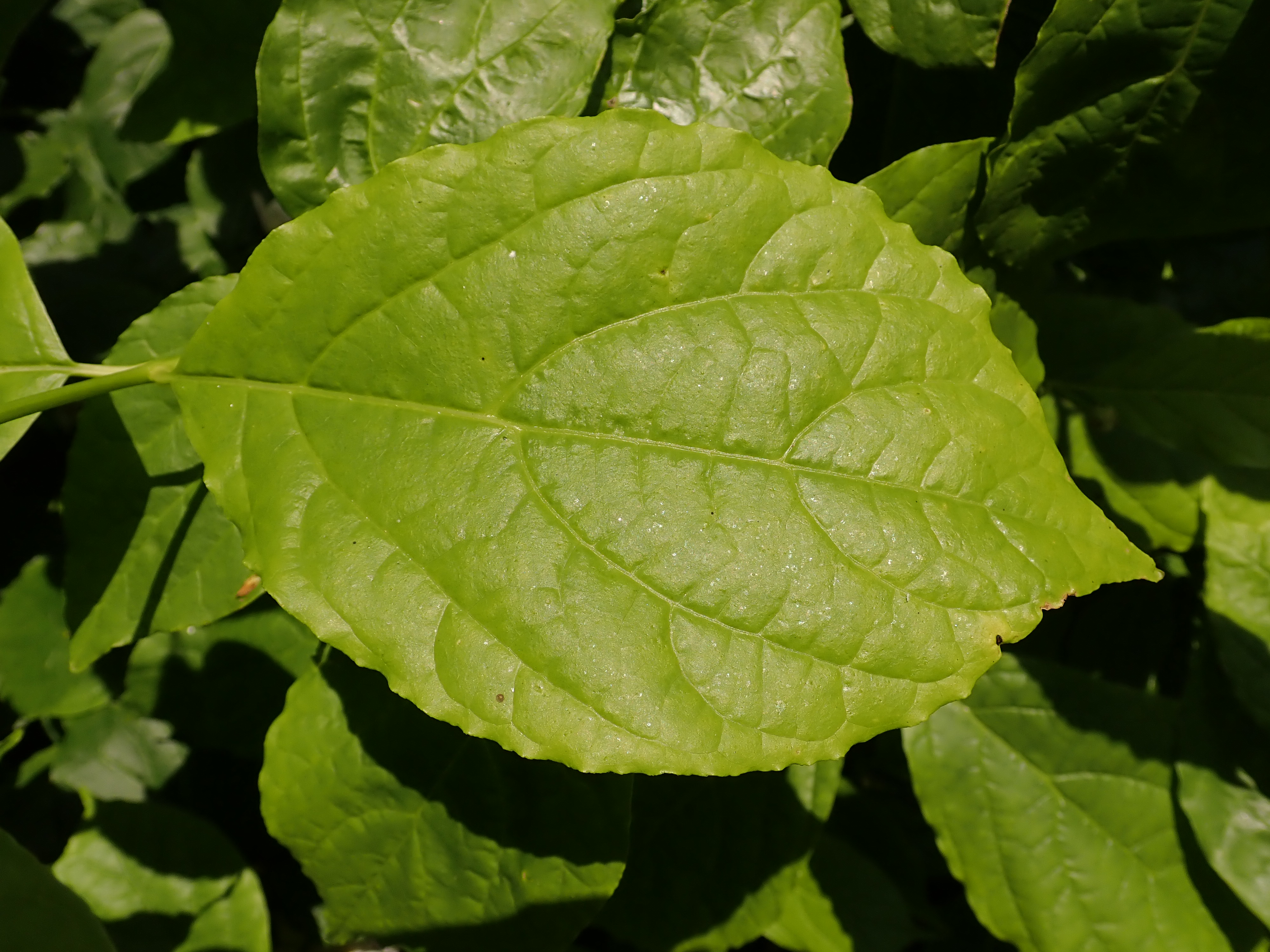
Leaf

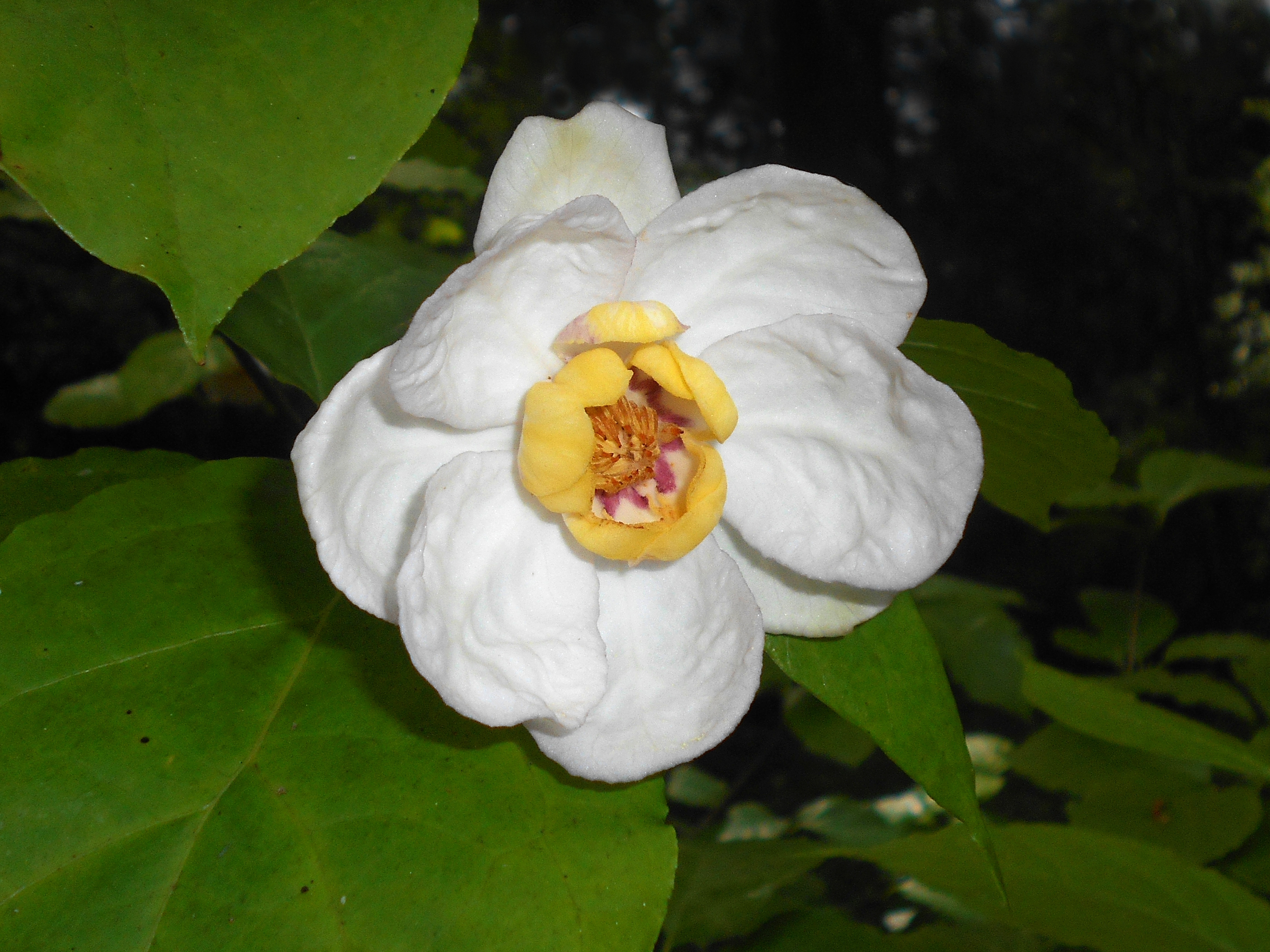
White flower
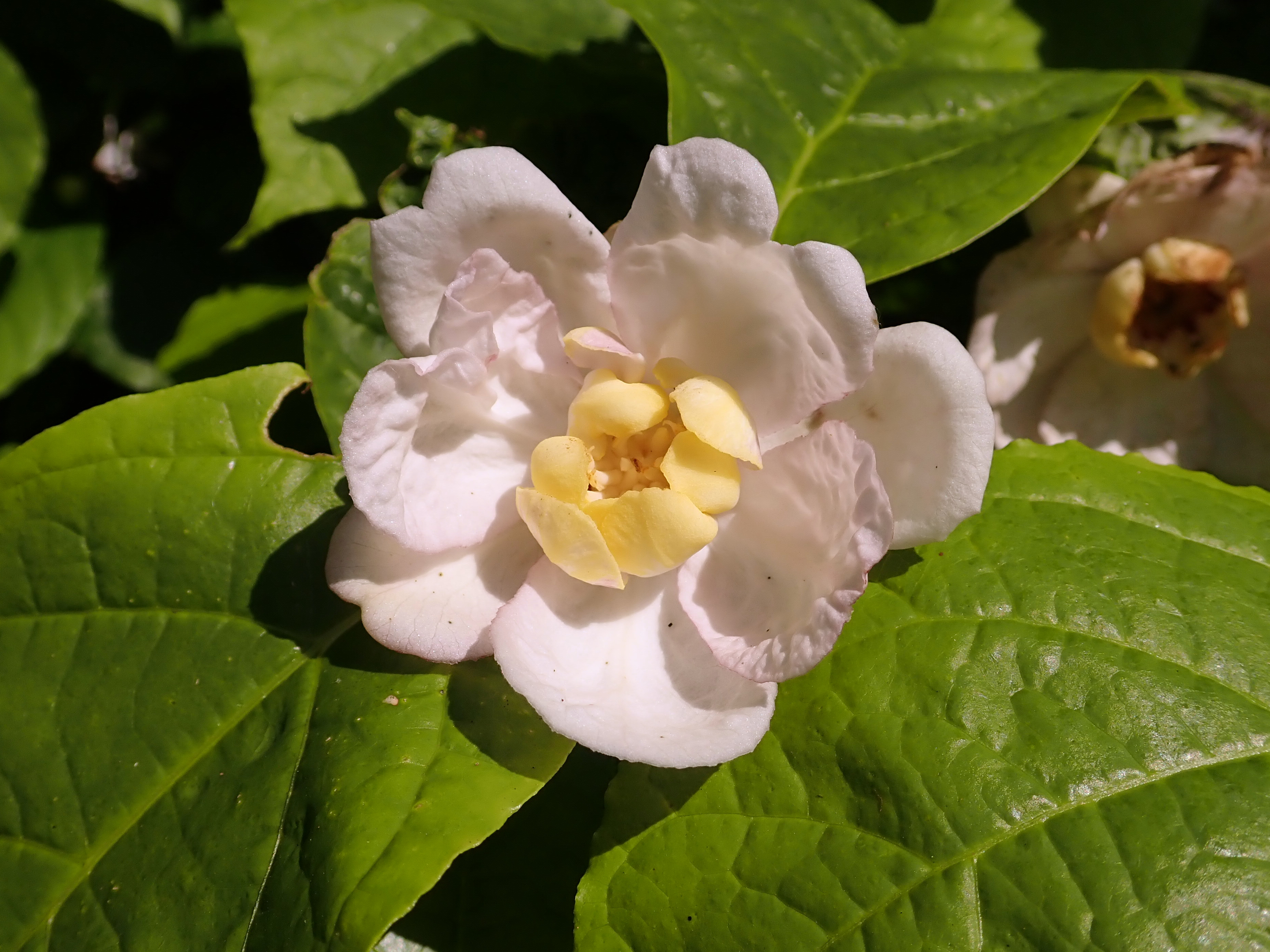
Pink-tinged flower

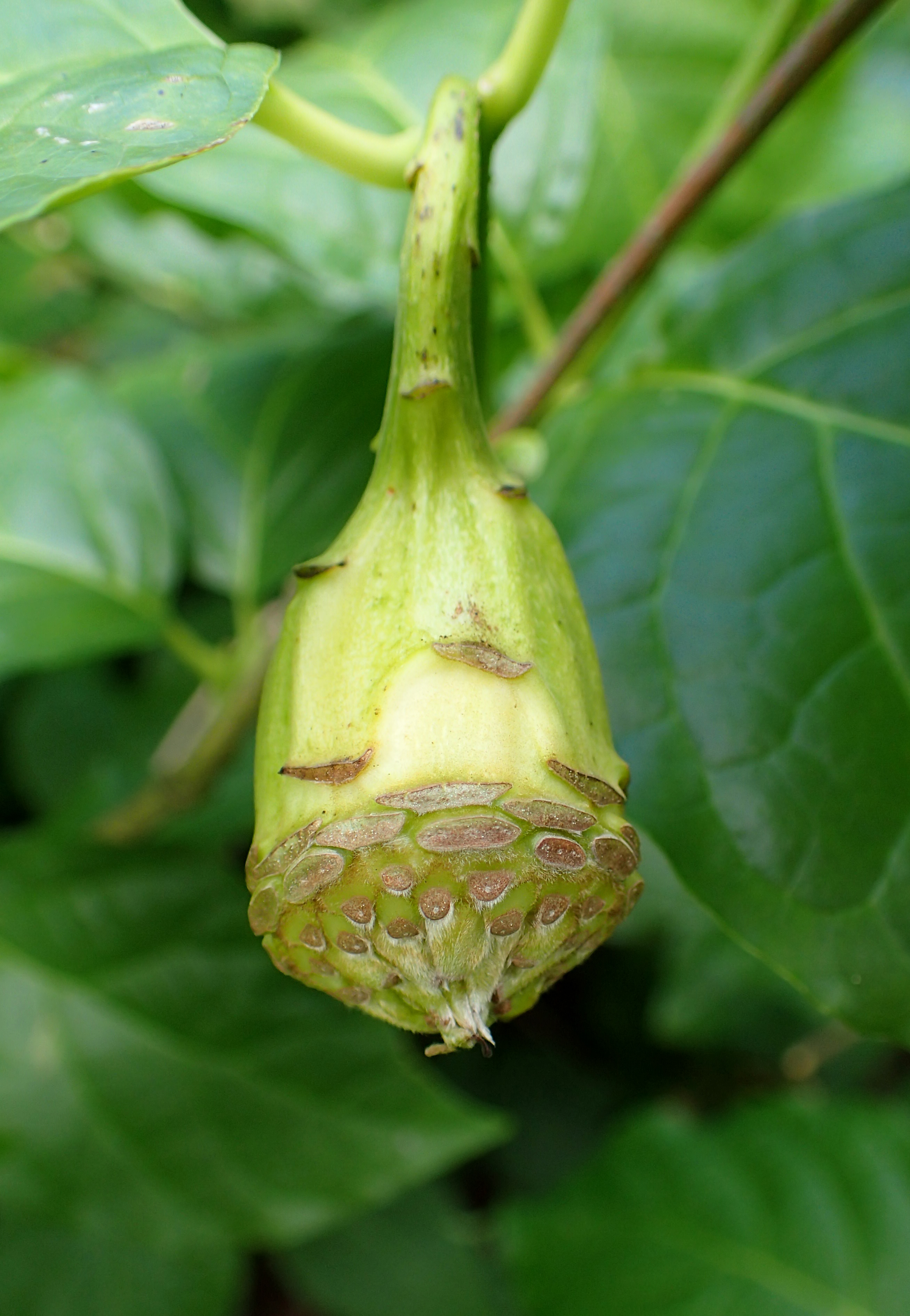
Fruit showing tepal scars

== Taxonomy ==
Calycanthus chinensis has a somewhat confused taxonomic history. It was first described in 1963 as Calycanthus chinensis by W.C. Cheng and S.Y. Chang. However, their use of the name was invalid under the International Code of Nomenclature for algae, fungi, and plants, because two different collections were both given as holotypes. (Article 9.1 requires the holotype to be only one specimen.) The authors then described it validly in 1964 in their new genus Sinocalycanthus. In 1979, P.T. Li rejected the genus Sinocalycanthus, and validated the original name Calycanthus chinensis (inadvertently according to the International Plant Names Index).

A 2006 molecular phylogenetic study of the family Calycanthaceae found that the three widely recognized species of Calycanthus formed a monophyletic group. Relationships among the three species differed depending on whether chloroplast or nuclear data was used: C. chinensis was either sister to C. floridus plus C. occidentalis, or formed a clade with C. occidentalis, C. floridus being sister to both.

== Distribution and habitat ==
Calycanthus chinensis is known from Zhejiang Province in southeastern China, where it is found at elevations of 600–1,000 m (1,970–3,280 ft) in woods, particularly along streams.

== Cultivation ==
Calycanthus chinensis is cultivated as an ornamental shrub. In the United States, it is usually considered hardy in zones 6–8. In Europe, it is hardy as far north as eastern Scotland. Well-drained but moist, acid soils are recommended. In cooler climates, full sun is recommended, and it will have a long flowering season, beginning in June in southern England. In warmer climates in the US, it will grow in some shade and has a shorter but earlier flowering season, beginning in April. It can be propagated by softwood cuttings in summer, or by seed.

=== Hybridization ===
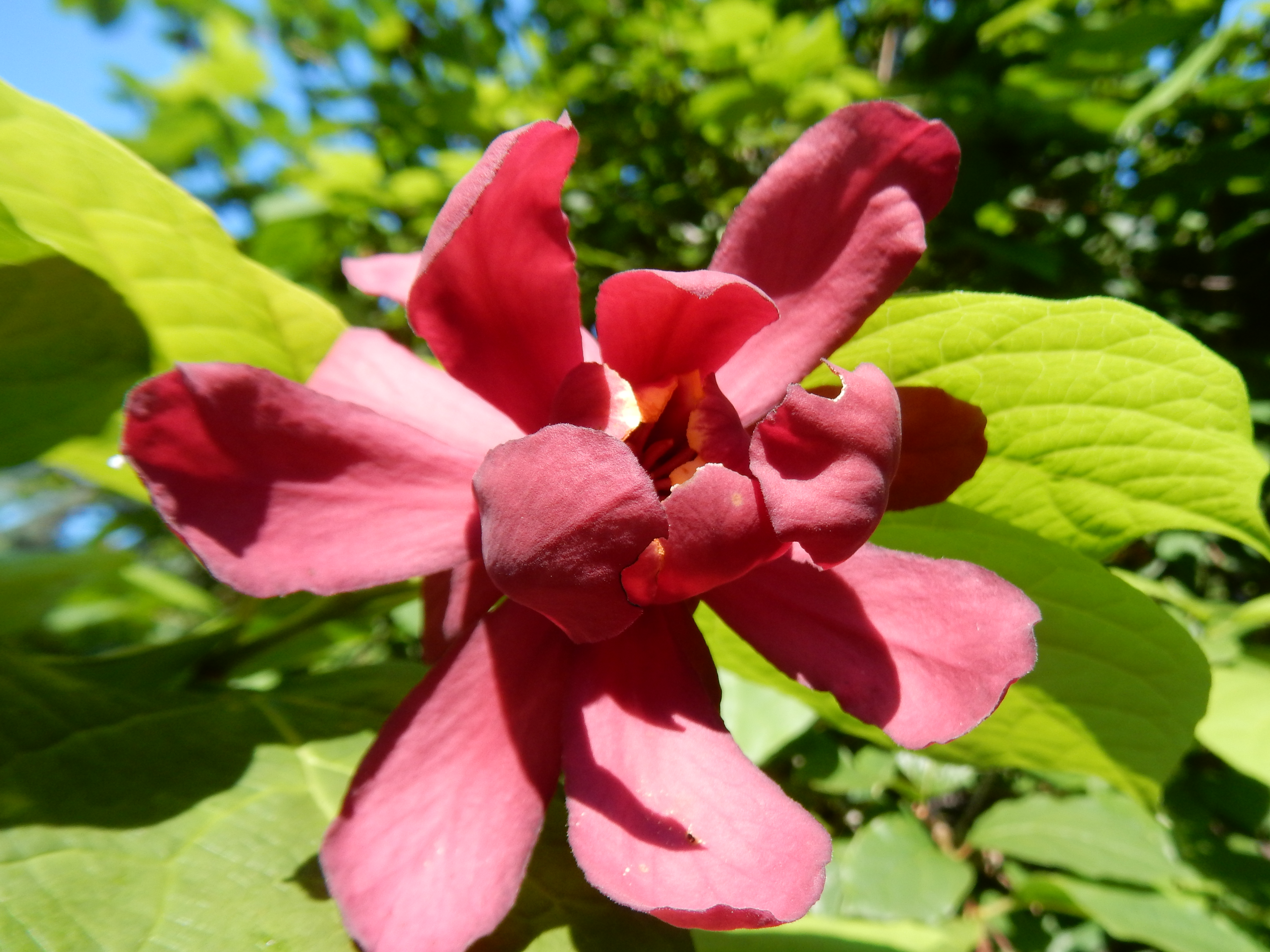
Calycanthus × raulstonii 'Hartlage Wine'

Calycanthus chinensis has been hybridized with the two North American species of Calycanthus, the aim being to combine the larger flowers of C. chinensis with the colour and fragrance of those of C. floridus and C. occidentalis. The North American species are also hardier. The first cross, made in 1991 by Richard Hartlage at North Carolina State University, was between C. chinesis and C. floridus. The hybrid has been given the scientific name C. × raulstonii, with the original cross treated as the cultivar 'Hartlage Wine'. Further crosses have been made. 'Venus' also involves C. occidentalis.
