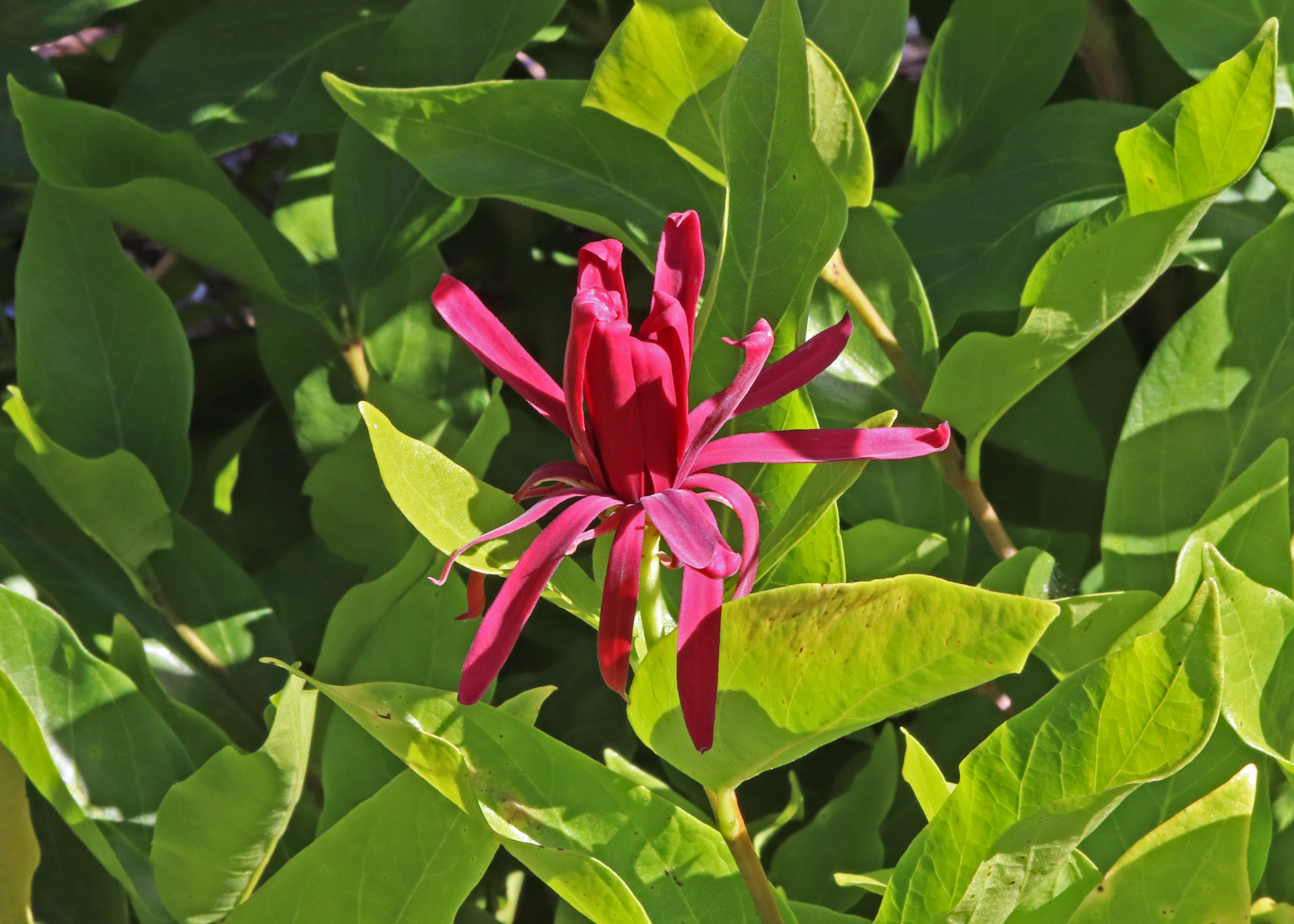

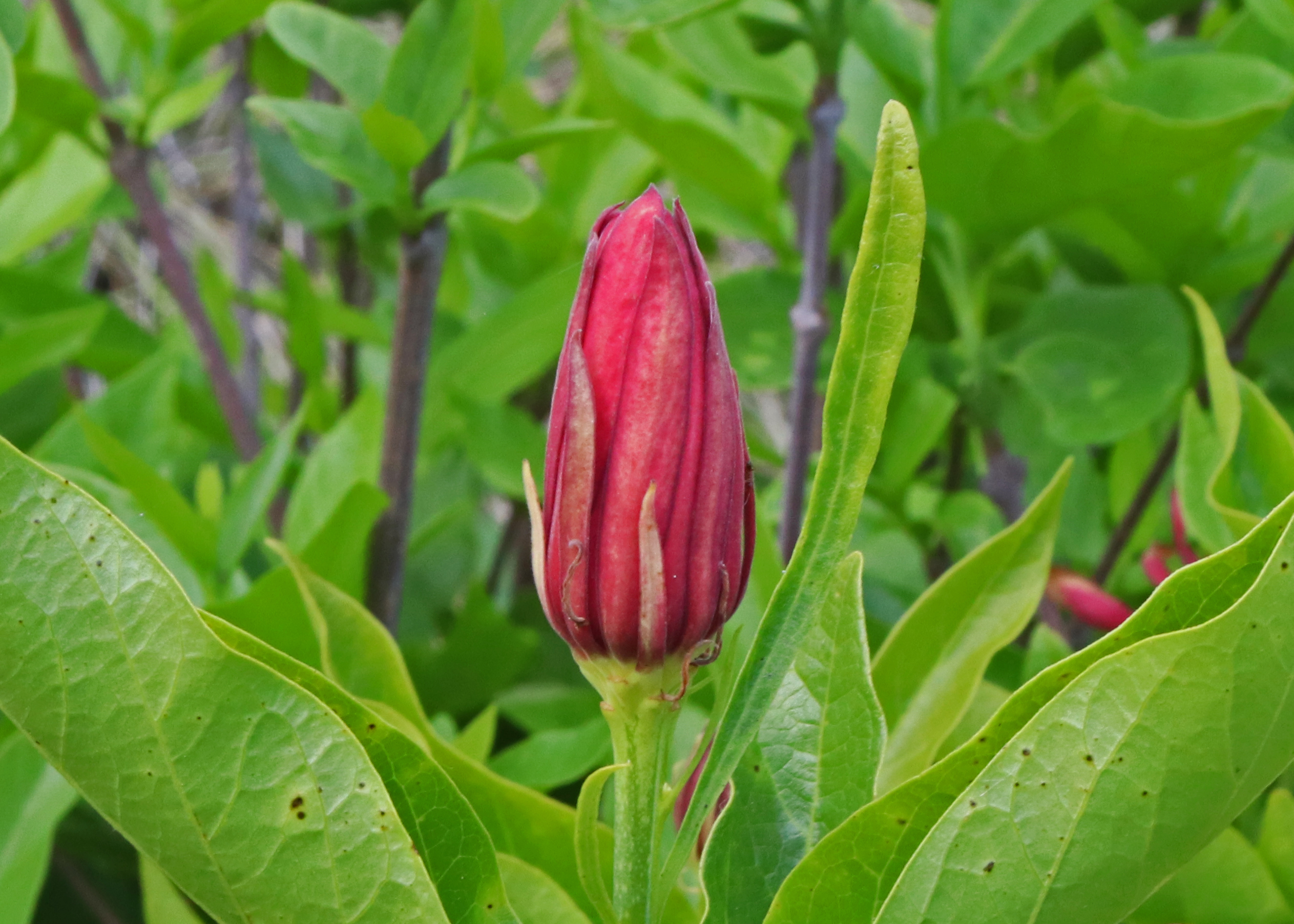
- The flowers do not have distinct sepals and petals.

Conservation status
- Vulnerable (NatureServe)

Scientific classification
- Kingdom: Plantae
- Clade: Tracheophytes
- Clade: Angiosperms
- Clade: Magnoliids
- Order: Laurales
- Family: Calycanthaceae
- Genus: Calycanthus
- Species: C. occidentalis

Binomial name
- Calycanthus occidentalis Hook. & Arn.

Synonyms
- Butneria occidentalis (Hook. & Arn.) Greene; Calycanthus macrophyllus K.Koch

= Calycanthus occidentalis =

Species of flowering plant

Calycanthus occidentalis, commonly called spice bush or western sweetshrub, is a species of flowering shrub in the family Calycanthaceae that is native to California. It grows along streams and moist canyons in the foothills of mountains.

== Description ==
Calycanthus occidentalis is a deciduous shrub that can reach a height of 4 m (13 ft). Its leaves are opposite, and grow to about 5–15 cm (2–6 in) long and 2–8 cm (0.8–3.1 in) wide. They are more-or-less ovate with acute tips, a rounded base. The flowers appear from late spring to early fall. The flowers do not have distinctive sepals and petals, but have swirls of dark red to burgundy colored petal-like structures called tepals, 2–6 cm (0.8–2.4 in) long and 0.5–1 cm (0.2–0.4 in) wide. The flowers open to about 5 cm (2 in) wide, but can occasionally reach 8 cm (3.1 in) wide. According to Munz and Keck, the tepals can be up to 6 cm (2.4 in) long for a potential flower width of 12 cm (4.7 in). The tepals enclose about 10–15 stamens. The flowers are pollinated by beetles of the family Nitidulidae.

== Cytology ==
The chromosome count is 2n= 22.

== Distribution and habitat ==
Calycanthus occidentalis is endemic to California, and found throughout much of the state from as far north as the Klamath Mountains and as far south as the San Joaquin Valley. Past collections in Washington have been found to have escaped cultivation, and are not naturally occurring. It grows along streams and on moist canyon slopes at elevations of 200–1,600 m (700–5,200 ft).
