= Calycanthine =

Names
- IUPAC name (1S,2R,10S,11R)-21,24-dimethyl-3,12,21,24-tetrazahexacyclo[9.7.3.32,10.01,10.04,9.013,18]tetracosa-4,6,8,13,15,17-hexaene

Identifiers
CAS Number	595-05-1
3D model (JSmol)	Interactive image
ChEBI	CHEBI:3333
ChEMBL	ChEMBL464770
ChemSpider	232050
ECHA InfoCard	100.008.963
EC Number	209-857-7
KEGG	C10573
PubChem CID	5392245
UNII	F62N8QPR7V
CompTox Dashboard (EPA)	DTXSID10974900
- InChI: InChI=1S/C22H26N4/c1-25-13-11-22-16-8-4-5-9-17(16)23-19(25)21(22)12-14-26(2)20(22)24-18-10-6-3-7-15(18)21/h3-10,19-20,23-24H,11-14H2,1-2H3/t19-,20-,21-,22-/m1/s1 Key: XSYCDVWYEVUDKQ-GXRSIYKFSA-N
- SMILES: CN1CC[C@@]23[C@@H]4NC5=CC=CC=C5[C@@]2([C@@H]1NC6=CC=CC=C36)CCN4C

Properties
Chemical formula	C_{22}H_{26}N_{4}
Molar mass	346.478 g·mol^{−1}
Appearance	Light yellow to yellow
Melting point	245 °C (473 °F; 518 K)
Solubility in water	Chloroform (Slightly), methanol (Slightly)
- Except where otherwise noted, data are given for materials in their standard state (at 25 °C [77 °F], 100 kPa). Infobox references

Calycanthine is a naturally occurring convulsant with a complex six-ring bridge structure; it is the principal alkaloid of plants in the Calycanthaceae family.

Calycanthine is found in herbs and spices. Calycanthin is a compound containing a naphthyridine moiety, naphthalene, in which a carbon atom has been replaced by a nitrogen atom in each of the two rings. The naphthyridine skeleton can also be described as a combination of two fused pyridine rings that do not share a nitrogen atom. Alternatively, it is also described as a cyclotriptamine alkaloid or a dimeric indole alkaloid.

== History ==
Phytochemical studies of plants in the Calycanthaceae family were first described in 1888, leading to the isolation of the first Calycanthaceae alkaloid, the dextrorotatory calycanthine with a dimeric piperidinoquinoline skeleton, from the seeds of Calycanthus glaucus by Eccles. A year later, Harvey Wiley demonstrated the high content of this alkaloid in the seeds of the same plant. In 1905, further progress was made by Gordin, who crystallised this principal alkaloid in various forms at room temperature and determined its molecular formula to be C_{11}H_{14}N_{2}, containing no oxygen atoms. A few years later, Späth and Stroh expressed their disagreement with Gordin's work and stated that the empirical formula of (+)-calycanthine should be doubled to C_{22}H_{28}N_{4}. Shortly afterwards, Manske proposed that this molecular formula might be C_{22}H_{26}N_{4}, which was definitively proven by Berger's group in 1939. The structure of (+)-calycanthine, that is, C_{22}H_{26}N_{4}, was definitively established by Hamor's group in 1962.

== Biosynthesis ==
There is a potential biosynthetic pathway for calycanthine; N-methyltryptamine is thought to act as a precursor for calycanthine and related alkaloids, through the oxidative dimerisation of two NMT molecules, an unstable aldehyde (tetraaminodialdehyde) is formed, which undergoes several enzyme-catalysed reactions and modifications, leading to the formation of calycanthine and CPC-2.

Nevertheless, it is difficult to say whether this biosynthetic pathway is indeed the only one for calycanthine; in other words, the model is a hypothesis.

== Plants containing calycanthine ==
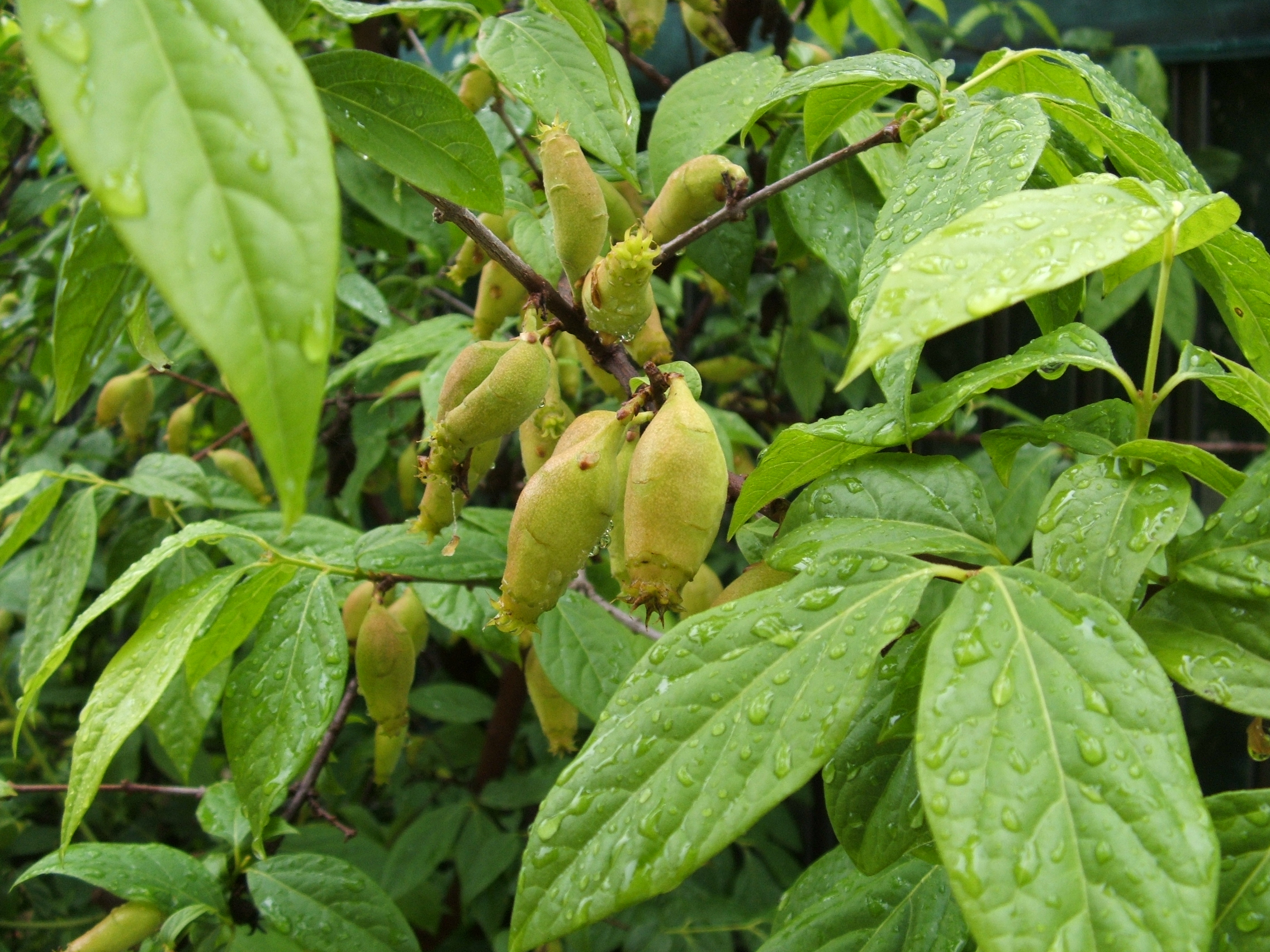
Chimonanthus praecox

Calycanthine occurs naturally in the form of a dextrorotatory and a levorotatory isomer (mirror images of one another; see also chirality). Calycanthine is more commonly found as two optical isomers — the dextrorotatory and levorotatory enantiomers — although it was undoubtedly the (+)-calycanthine (i.e. the dextrorotatory form) was first isolated from the plant Calycanthus floridus, whose seeds contain a fairly high (1.2 per cent) concentration of the alkaloid, although the highest concentration is found in the seeds of Meratia praecox (C. praecox), where it is present in a quantity of 2.6 per cent.

== Chemistry ==

Owing to their characteristic carbon-C2-symmetric bridged bicyclic structures and four chiral centres, three possible stereoisomerss of calycanthine have been identified: (+)-calycanthine, (−)-calycanthine and meso-calycanthine

=== Synthesis ===
The total chemical synthesis of these alkaloids has been the subject of intensive study for decades; Hino proposed that the structure of 1,1'-dimethyl-3,3'-bis(2-aminoethyl)-3,3'-bioxindole is a key intermediate in the synthesis of calycanthine and a related compound, whilst several other research groups attempted to synthesise these bispyrroloindoline structures via the oxidative dimerisation of indole and/or oxindole derivatives; Scott's group developed an approach using NMT as the starting material to form the magnesium salt of N-methyltryptamine in the presence of CH_{3}MgI. The intermediate compound was treated with ferric chloride to yield an indolenine dimer, which was subsequently converted into meso- and (±)-chimonanthine. Furthermore, (±)-calycanthine could be obtained by treating (±)-chimonanthine with hydrochloric acid.

Overman's group synthesised meso-calycanthine via samarium-mediated reductive dialkylation. Isoindigo was converted into the N-benzyl derivative 22, which was then converted to 24 by treating 2 equiv. with Kagan’s reagent in the presence of 10 equiv. of LiCl and cis-1,4-dichloro-2-butene. Compound 24 was subsequently converted into the hexacycle 25 using sodium bis(2-methoxyethoxy)aluminium hydride. The cyclohexene moiety of compound 25 was cleaved to give compound 26, which was reduced to diamine 28 via the diazide product 27. The intermediate compound 28 was then treated with an excess of trimethylaluminium at room temperature to yield bis(pyrroloindoline) 29. The desired meso-chimonanthine was obtained from 29 via a cascade of methylation and deprotection reactions. The final product, meso-calycanthine, was obtained by treating meso-chimonanthine with acetic acid.

In 2000, Overman and his group presented an approach to calycanthine using a Heck reaction cascade. A year later, they proposed the synthesis of 3a,3a'-bispyrrolidino[2,3-b]indolines, a precursor of meso-chimonanthine and (+)-chimonanthine. This dialkylation route utilised the reactivity of the dienolate (chelated or unchelated) and the chirality of the electrophile derived from tartrate to control the relative configuration and absolute stereochemistry, respectively. The following syntheses are described: Movassaghi's the synthesis of (−)-calycanthine and (+)-chimonanthine using reductive dimerisation of bromide, treatment of (-)-chimonanthine with acetic acid and deuterated water yielded (−)-calycanthine; the synthesis by the Kanai and Matsunaga group—a catalytic asymmetric total synthesis for the preparation of (−)-calycanthine and (+)-chimonanthine—is described.

== Toxicology ==
=== Toxicodynamics ===
Calycanthine, a centrally acting convulsant (having an effect on the central nervous system). Calycanthine may exert its convulsant effect primarily by inhibiting the release of the inhibitory neurotransmitter GABA as a result of interaction with L-type Ca^{2}⁺ channels, as well as by suppressing GABA-mediated chloride currents in GABAA receptors. The convulsant action of calycanthine is mediated, at least in part, by the blockade of the postsynaptic action of gamma-aminobutyric acid, as indicated by its inhibitory effect on the binding of the convulsant tert-butylbicyclophosphorothionate. Calycanthine inhibited GABA release from rat hippocampal slices with an ED_{50} of approximately 21 µM; however, although calycanthine is selective, at a very high concentration (100 µM) it had only a slight effect on acetylcholine release (15 per cent) and had no significant effect on the release of aspartic acid from hippocampal and cerebellar slices or on the release of glycine from spinal cord slices. Although it was more effective at blocking L-type calcium channels with an IC_{50} of approximately 42 µM, and also weakly inhibited N-type calcium channels (IC_{50} > 100 µM) in neuroblastoma and glioma hybridoma cells; calycanthine directly inhibits GABA-mediated currents (the blocking constant kB is approximately 135 µM) of human GABAA receptors (composition α1-β2-γ2L), but at a concentration of 100 µM had no effect on human GABAC receptors.

=== Effect on mammals ===
At least there are known cases of poisoning in sheep after ingesting wintersweet leaves, where they developed acute tonic-clonic seizures, opisthotonos, loss of pupillary light reflexes, and abnormalities in vital signs; it is stated that symptomatic treatment failed to revive the animals, yet one sheep recovered. Although cases of poisoning in livestock and ruminants are limited and no detailed reports have been published in the United States, calycanthine accumulates in the leaves, twigs, fruits, and especially seeds. A case of poisoning in goats in New Zealand is known, as well as cattle poisoning in Italy, leading to limb rigidity, dyspnea, and death. Similar clinical signs, including ataxia, convulsions, and death, were first recorded in cattle herds and sheep in Tennessee in 1888 following the consumption of Calycanthus floridus.
