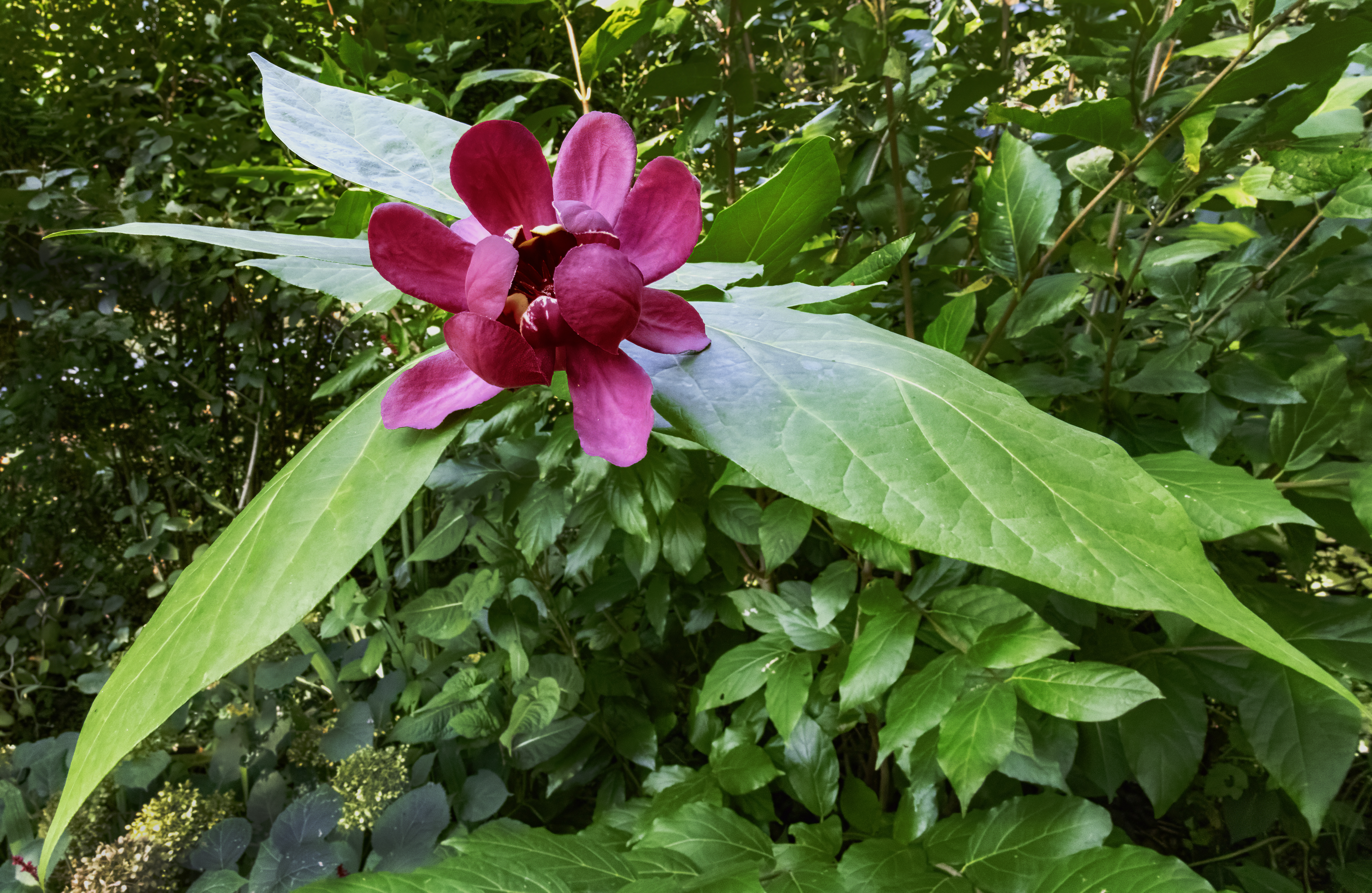

Conservation status
- Secure (NatureServe)

Scientific classification
- Kingdom: Plantae
- Clade: Tracheophytes
- Clade: Angiosperms
- Clade: Magnoliids
- Order: Laurales
- Family: Calycanthaceae
- Genus: Calycanthus
- Species: C. floridus

Binomial name
- Calycanthus floridus L.

= Calycanthus floridus =

Species of flowering plant

Calycanthus floridus, or commonly known as the eastern sweetshrub, Carolina allspice, or spicebush, is a species of flowering shrub in the family Calycanthaceae. It is identifiable by its dark red flowers and fragrant scent. It is non-invasive and is found in the Southeastern United States. The Nature Conservancy considers its conservation status to be G5, globally secure, indicating it is at low risk of extinction.

== Description ==
Calycanthus floridus is a shrub that grows to be around 6 to 9 ft (2 to 3 m) tall. Its leaves are a dark green with a pale underside. They are ovate or elliptical in shape and grow to be about 6 inches (15 cm) in length. The leaves are simple, entire, and arranged oppositely along the stem.

The flowers are solitary, featuring a reddish brown to reddish purple color when they bloom in spring. They are aromatic and so are the leaves when bruised. The flowers have a hypanthium that is more than 2 cm (0.8 in) long. The shape of the flowers can be cylindrical, ellipsoid, pyriform, or globose. The flowers have numerous tepals that can either be oblong-elliptic or obovate-lanceolate at maturity. The flowers are perfect, having both stamens and carpels on the flowers. The stamens are numerous, connective beyond the anthers. The carpels are numerous. They are free, with a single ovary in a locule.

The fruits are indehiscent pseudocarps that are about 8 cm (3 in) in length and 5 cm (2 in) in diameter at maturity. They are formed within the receptacle and contain numerous achenes that are roughly 10 mm (0.4 in) long with a 5 mm (0.2 in) diameter.

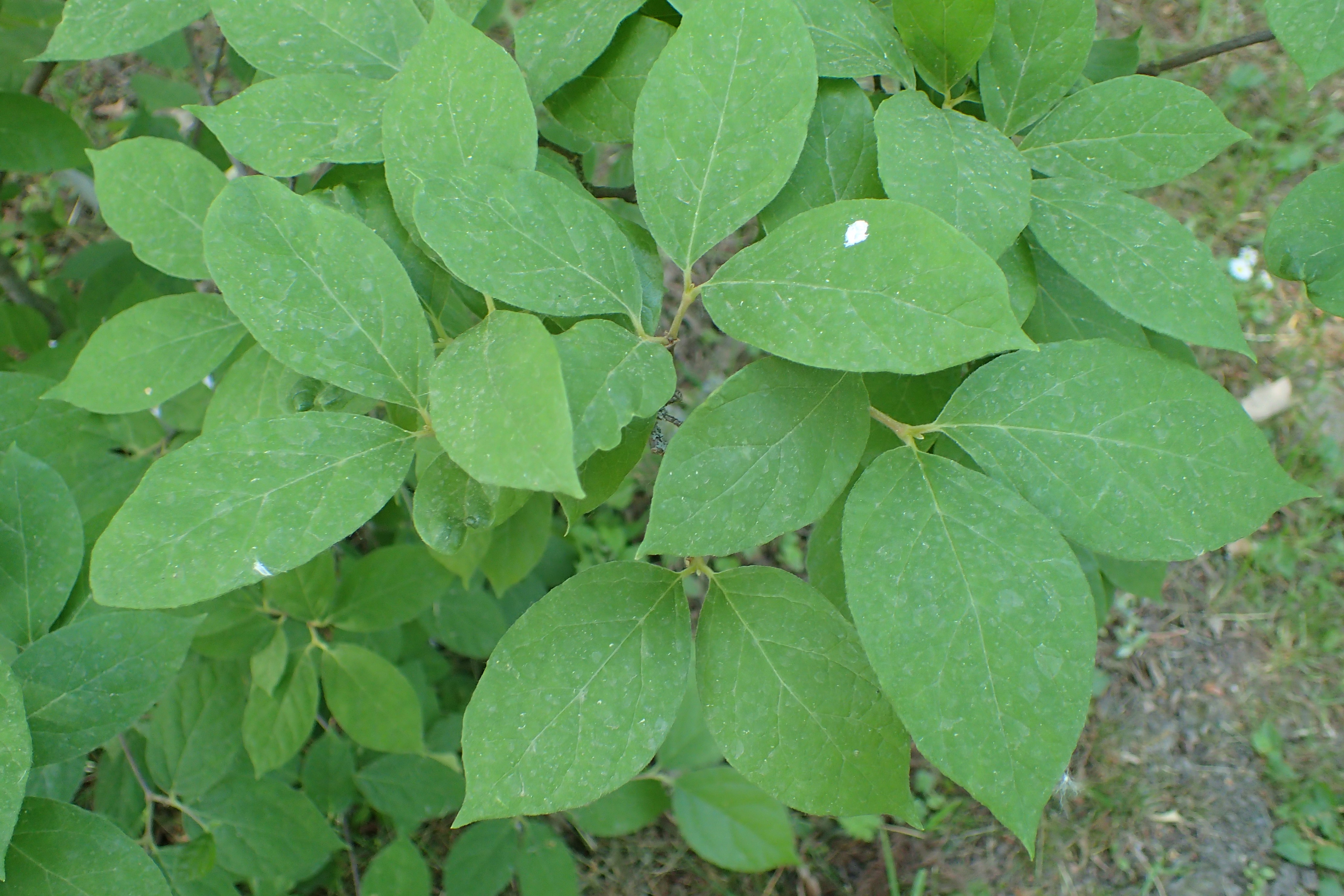
Leaves

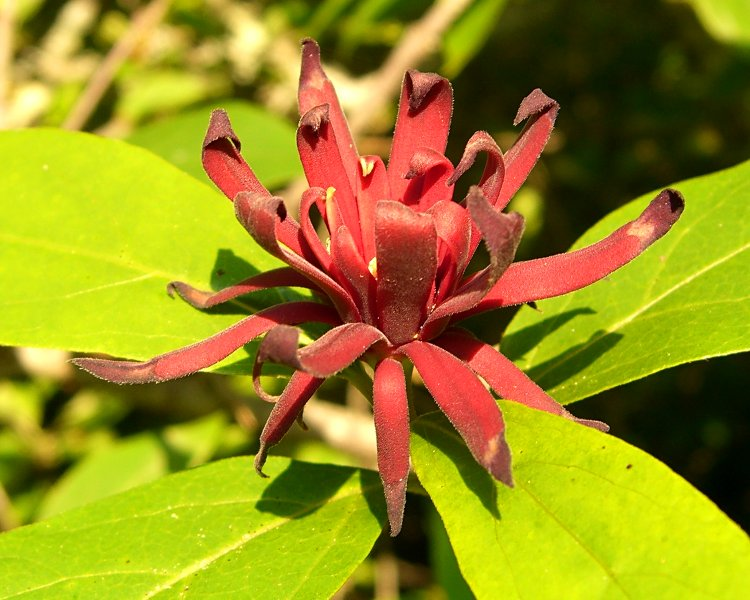
Flower

== Taxonomy ==
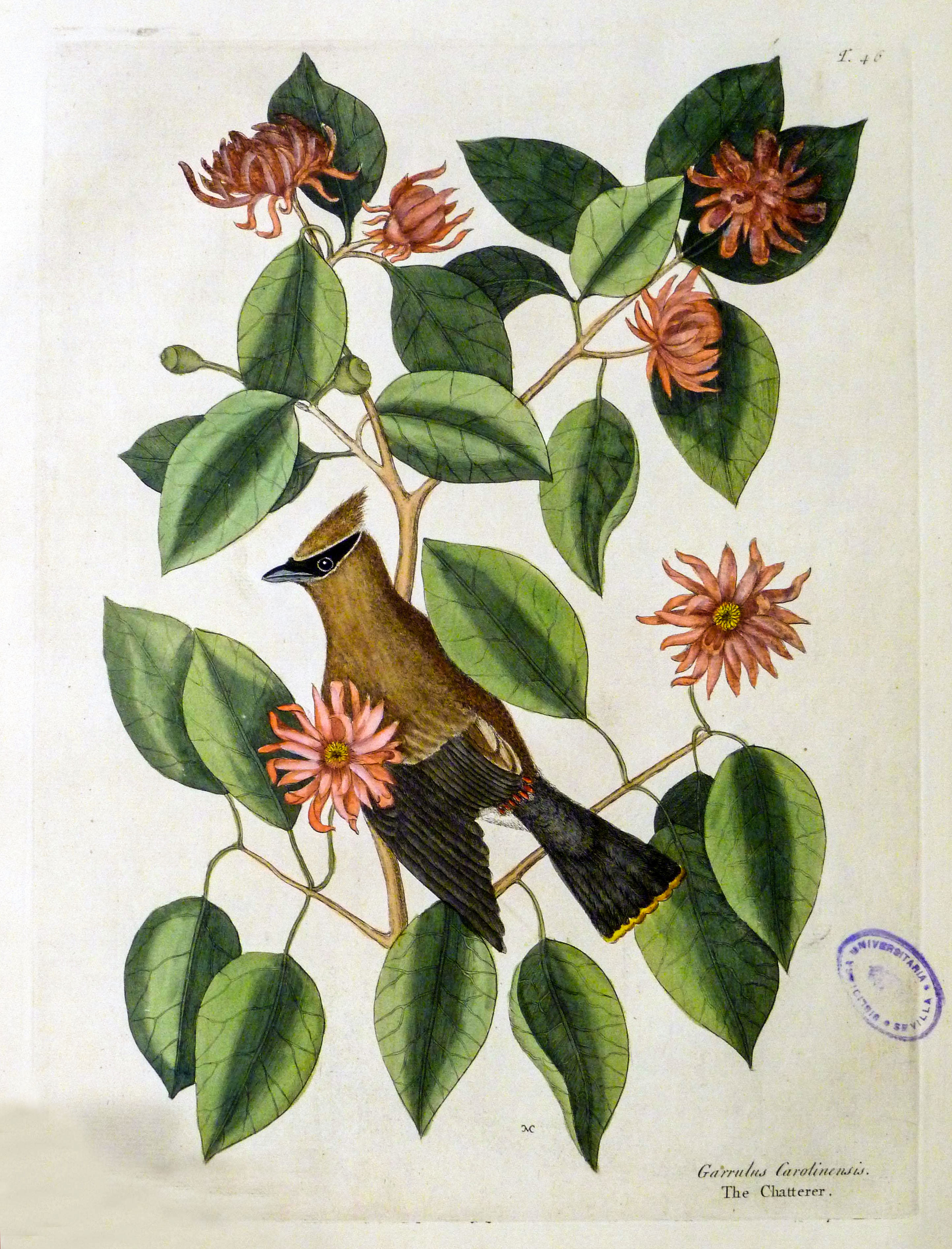
Oldest illustration, from a work by Mark Catesby published from 1731 onwards

Calycanthus floridus was first scientifically described by Carl Linnaeus in 1759. It was the only species in his new genus Calycanthus. Linnaeus referred to an earlier illustration by Mark Catesby, contained in a work published from 1731 onwards. Plants of the World Online accepted two infraspecies:

| Image | Subspecies | Description | Distribution |
|---|---|---|---|
| | Calycanthus floridus var. floridus (syn. C. mohrii) | eastern sweetshrub; twigs pubescent | Alabama, Florida, Georgia, Mississippi, North Carolina, South Carolina, Tennessee, Virginia |
| | Calycanthus floridus var. glaucus (Willd.) Torr. & A.Gray (syn. C. fertilis) | eastern sweetshrub; twigs glabrous (smooth). | Alabama, Georgia, Kentucky, North Carolina, Pennsylvania, South Carolina, Virginia, West Virginia |

== Distribution and habitat ==
Calycanthus floridus is native to the eastern United States. It is presumed to have been extirpated from Ohio. It prefers sunny habitats but can tolerate moderate amounts of shade. It grows well in environments that feature moist substrate.

== Uses ==
It is used in horticulture as the flowers are showy and fragrant. The bark of the plant is edible and is reportedly used as a substitute for cinnamon. The petals of the flower are also reportedly used in medicinal tea-making. Strong caution is advised however, as an alkaloid (calycanthine) in the plant may lead to heart convulsions. The viscous substance within the plant is reportedly used as a disinfectant.

It is highly resistant to diseases and insects, although it is prone to infection by Agrobacterium tumefaciens, which leads to the formation of crown galls on the stems.

This plant has been marked as a pollinator plant, supporting and attracting beetles.
