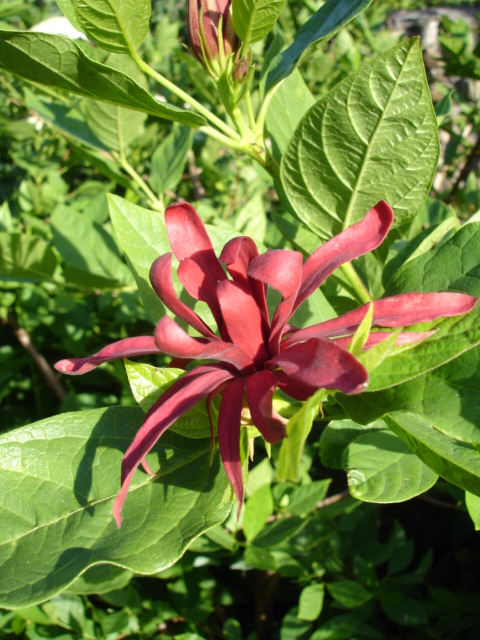
- Calycanthus floridus

Scientific classification
- Kingdom: Plantae
- Clade: Tracheophytes
- Clade: Angiosperms
- Clade: Magnoliids
- Order: Laurales
- Family: Calycanthaceae
- Genus: Calycanthus; L.

Species
- See text.

Synonyms
- List: Basteria Mill.; Beureria Ehret; Butneria Duhamel; Pompadoura Buc'hoz ex DC.; × Sinocalycalycanthus F.T.Lass. & Fantz; Sinocalycanthus W.C.Cheng & S.Y.Chang

= Calycanthus =

Genus of flowering plants in the Magnoliid family Calycanthaceae

Calycanthus, called sweetshrub, is a genus of flowering plants in the family Calycanthaceae. The genus includes two to four species depending on taxonomic interpretation; three are accepted by most 21st century sources.

== Description ==
Calycanthus plants are deciduous shrubs, growing to 4 m (13 ft) tall. The leaves are opposite and undivided. The plants are aromatic. The flowers are typical of the family Calycanthaceae in lacking distinct sepals and petals, but instead having spirals of tepals. Flowers are produced from spring onwards, until October in the case of C. occidentalis. The flowers of the two North American species are scented, 4–7 cm (1.6–2.8 in) across, with numerous dark red to burgundy to purplish brown tepals. C. chinensis has broader tepals, the outer ones white flushed with pink, the inner ones mostly yellow with purple marks at the base. The fruit is an elliptical dry capsule, containing numerous seeds.

C. floridus and C. occidentalis are pollinated by beetles. Their flowers produce small protein-rich growths that feed beetle pollinators. C. occidentalis has been shown to produce chemicals that mimic fermenting fruits that attract beetles in the families Nitidulidae and Staphylinidae.

== Taxonomy ==
The genus Calycanthus was created by Carl Linnaeus in 1759, with the sole species Calycanthus floridus. In 1762, he added Calycanthus praecox, now treated as Chimonanthus praecox.

=== Phylogeny and evolution ===
A 2006 molecular phylogenetic study of the family Calycanthaceae found that the three widely recognized species of Calycanthus formed a monophyletic group. Relationships among the three species differed depending on whether chloroplast or nuclear data was used. A cladogram obtained by combining the two is shown below.

- Calycanthaceae
  - Idiospermum (Australia)
  - - - Calycanthus floridus (eastern North America)
      - - Calycanthus occidentalis (western North America)
        - Calycanthus chinensis (China)
    - Chimonanthus (China)

The family Calycanthaceae may have had a Gondwanan origin. The sole Australian representative, Idiospermum australiense, would then represent an ancient relic, probably having diverged in the Cretaceous. There are no extant South American members of the family, although fossils are known. Calycanthus may have migrated into North America from eastern Asia, or may have originated in South America, moved northwards and then spread to eastern Asia.

=== Species ===
As of February 2020, Plants of the World Online accepted four species:

- Calycanthus brockianus Ferry & Ferry f.—north central Georgia; has greenish rather than brownish red flowers, and may only be a triploid color variant of C. floridus.
- Calycanthus chinensis (W.C.Cheng & S.Y.Chang) W.C.Cheng & S.Y.Chang ex P.T.Li (syn. Sinocalycanthus sinensis)—Chinese sweetshrub, Chinese wax shrub, native to eastern China, with white flowers
- Calycanthus floridus L.—Carolina spicebush, eastern sweetshrub, native to the Eastern United States, from New York and Missouri, south through the Appalachian Mountains, Piedmont, and Mississippi Valley, to Louisiana, and east to northern Florida
  - C. f. var. floridus (syn. C. mohrii)—eastern sweetshrub; twigs pubescent (hairy)
  - C. f. var. glaucus (syn. C. fertilis)—eastern sweetshrub; twigs glabrous (smooth).
- Calycanthus occidentalis Hook. & Arn.—California spicebush, western sweetshrub, native to moist habitats of California below 1,500 m (4,900 ft), including in the California Coast Ranges, San Joaquin Valley, and Sierra Nevada. As of February 2021, the Oregon Flora Project documented two specimens in Oregon, marked as "exotic?".

C. chinensis has a confused taxonomic history. It was first described in 1963 as Calycanthus chinensis by W.C. Cheng and S.Y. Chang, but invalidly because two different collections were both given as holotypes. The authors then described it validly in 1964 in their new genus Sinocalycanthus. In 1979, P.T. Li rejected the genus Sinocalycanthus, and validated the original name Calycanthus chinensis.

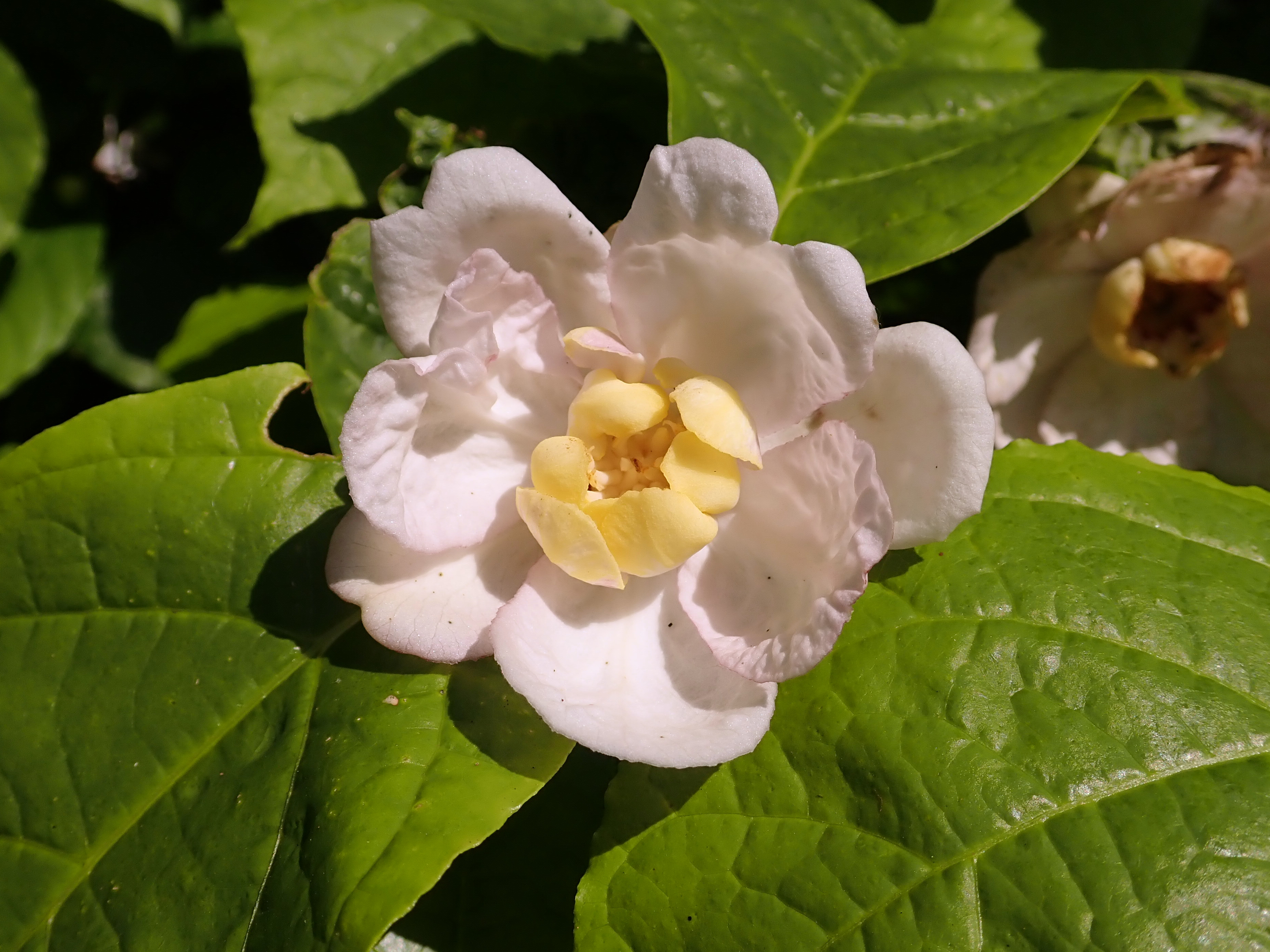
C. chinensis–Chinese sweetshrub

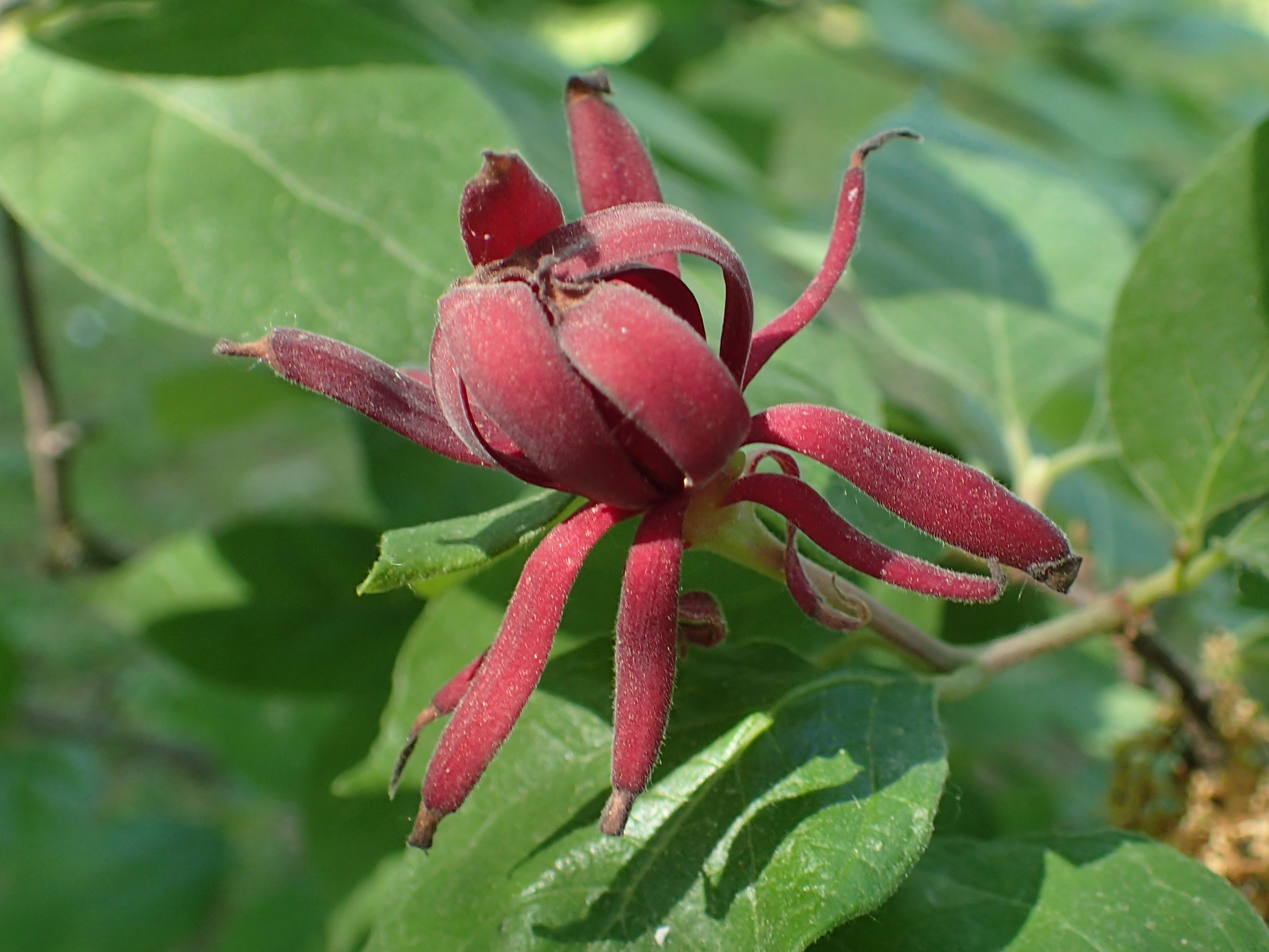
C. floridus—eastern sweetshrub

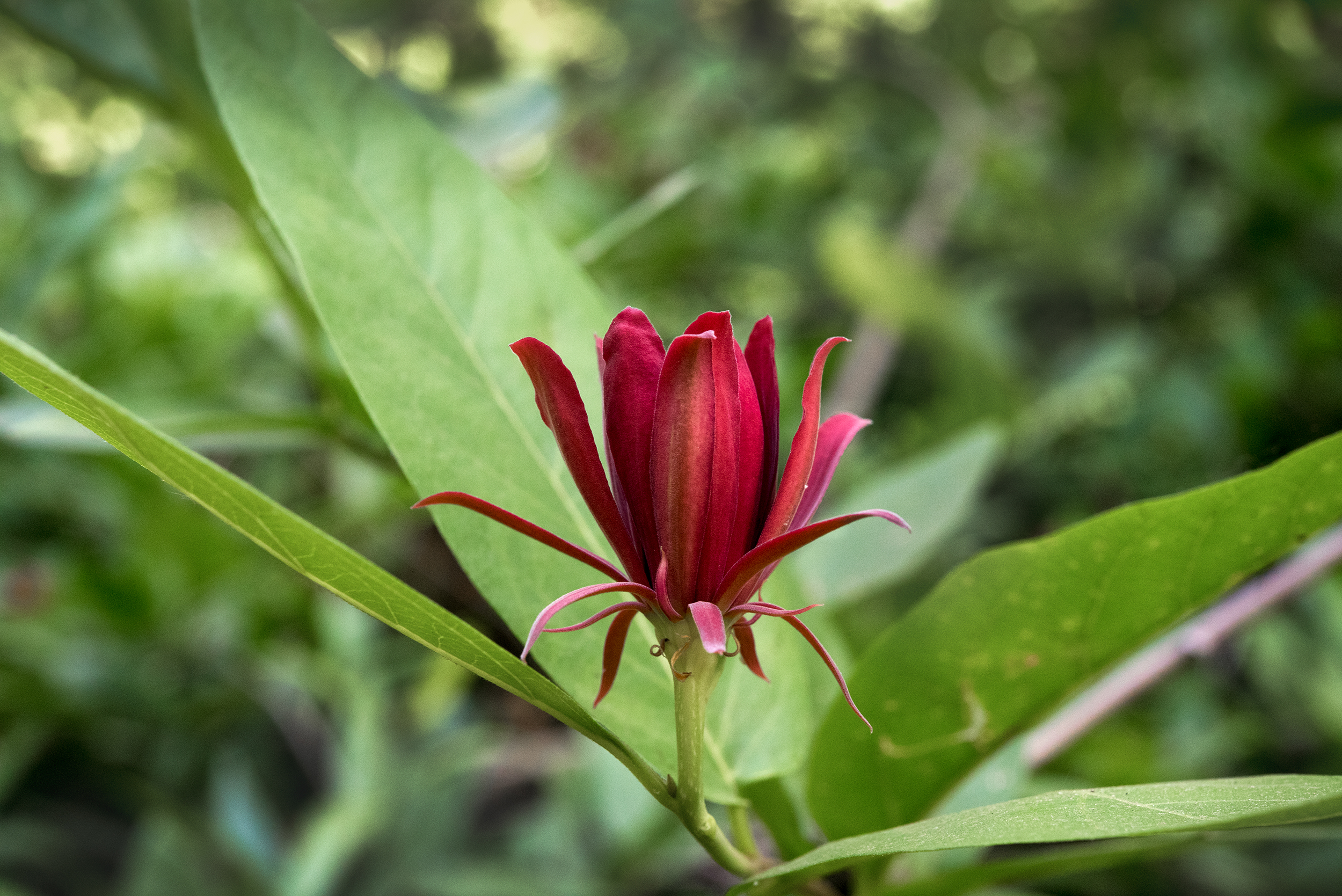
C. occidentalis—western sweetshrub

== Cultivation ==
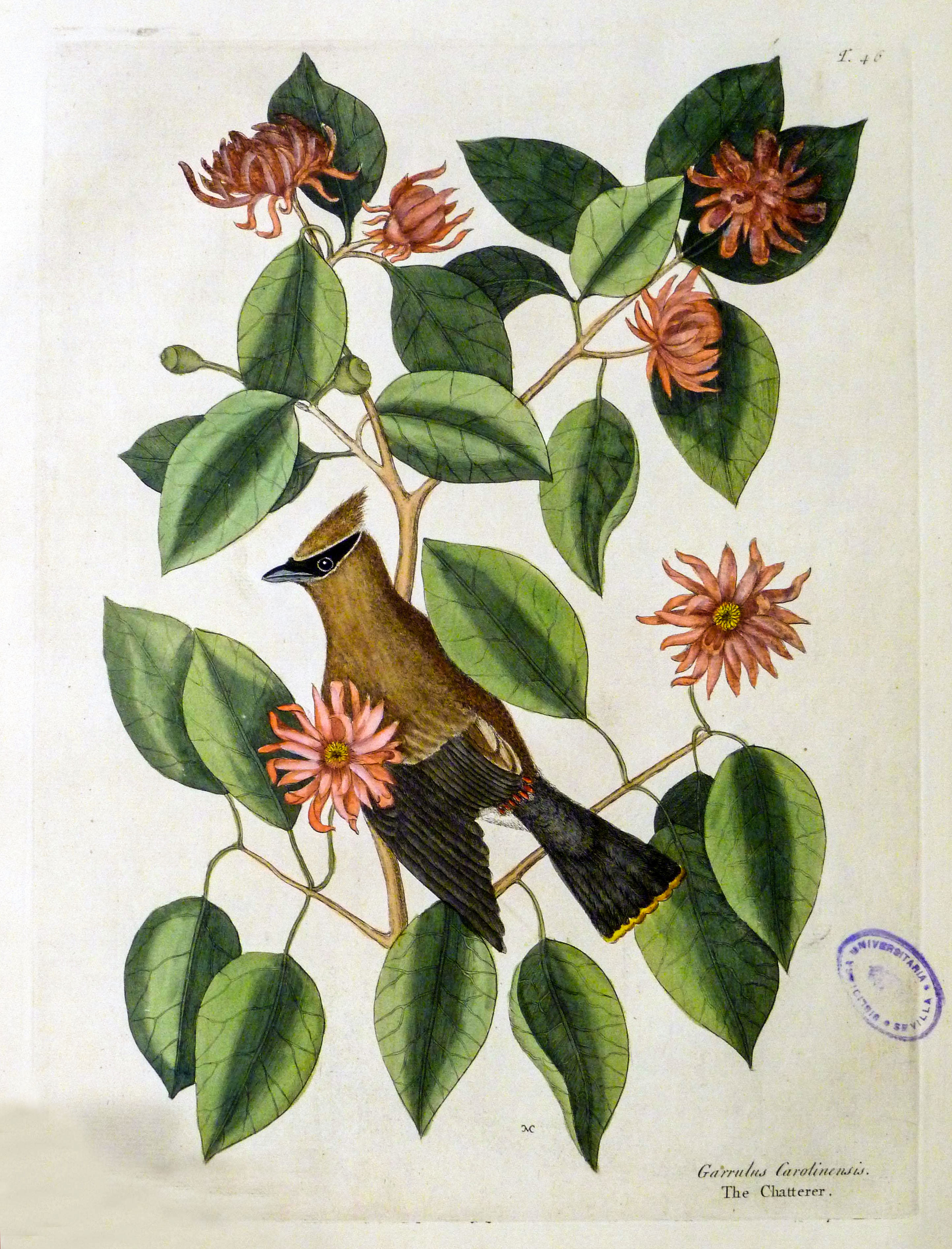
The earliest illustration of Calycanthus floridus, from a work published from 1731 onwards

Calycanthus species are cultivated as ornamental plants by plant nurseries, including in the United States and England.

Calycanthus floridus is planted in gardens, as a specimen shrub, or for hedges. The English naturalist Mark Catesby drew it as the support for the bird he called "Garrulus Carolinensis The Chatterer" (now Bombycilla cedrorum) in a work published from 1731 onwards. He described the shrub as growing in "remote and hilly parts" and having bark "as odoriferous as cinnamon". The colonial planters of the Carolinas transplanted it into their gardens, and the botanist Peter Collinson described it to Linnaeus and imported it into England from Charleston in the Province of South Carolina around 1756.

Calycanthus occidentalis is planted in traditional, native plant, and wildlife gardens, and for natural landscaping and habitat restoration projects, primarily in California and the Western United States. It was introduced into cultivation in 1831.

Calycanthus chinensis was introduced into cultivation in both the United States and the United Kingdom from the Shanghai Botanical Garden in the 1980s. It has since been used extensively in the breeding of cultivars.

=== Hybridization ===
Several hybrids and hybrid cultivars have been produced, with the intention of combining the larger flower size of C. chinensis with the colour and scent of the two North American species, as well as their greater hardiness. The hybrid between C. chinensis and C. floridus has been named C. × raulstonii. It combines the larger flowers of C. chinesis with the flower color of C. floridus. The original cross has been given the cultivar name 'Hartlage Wine' after the student, Richard Hartlage, who made the first crosses. Further crosses have been made. 'Venus' involves C. occidentalis as well.

Hybrid cultivars include:

- 'Aphrodite' (C. chinensis × C. occidentalis) – US; large reddish-purple flowers with yellow marks on the inner tepals, borne on relatively long stalks; long flowering season
- 'Hartlage Wine' (C. × raulstonii) – US, 1991; resembles C. chinensis in leaf and flower size, with the flower colour of C. floridus; may reach 2 m (7 ft) in height; given the Royal Horticultural Society's Award of Garden Merit
- 'Hongyun' (C. × raulstonii) – China, 2001; large flowers of C. chinensis with the red colour of C. floridus
- 'Solar Flare' (C. × raulstonii) – US, 2003–2006; similar to 'Hartlage Wine' but with larger and thicker leaves and smaller flowers; appears to be hardier to frost than 'Hartlage Wine'
- 'Venus' (C. × raulstonii × [C. chinensis × C. occidentalis]) – large white flowers, marked with yellow and purple at the centre; strongly fragrant
Calycanthus cultivars

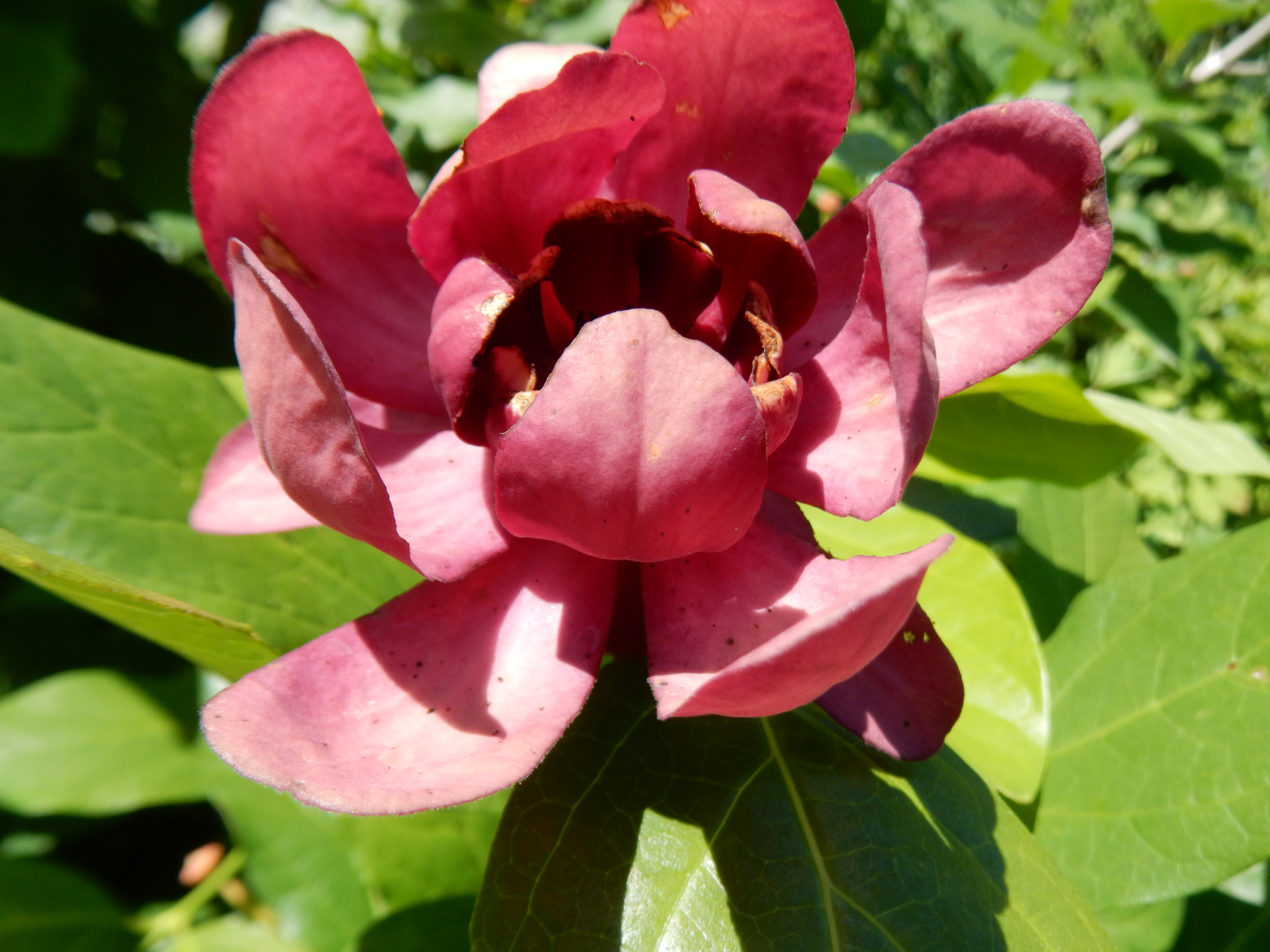
Calycanthus 'Aphrodite'

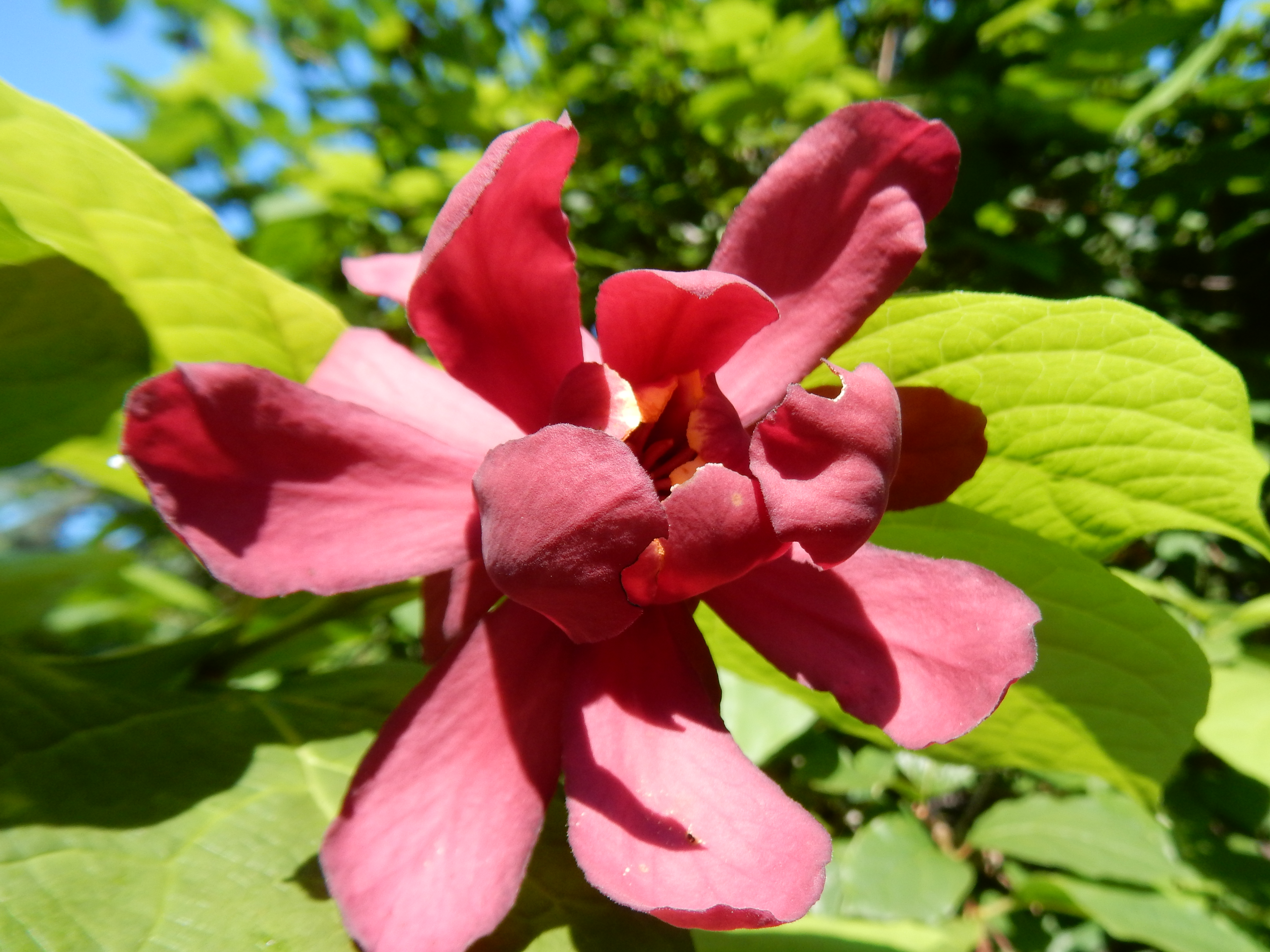
Calycanthus × raulstonii 'Hartlage Wine'

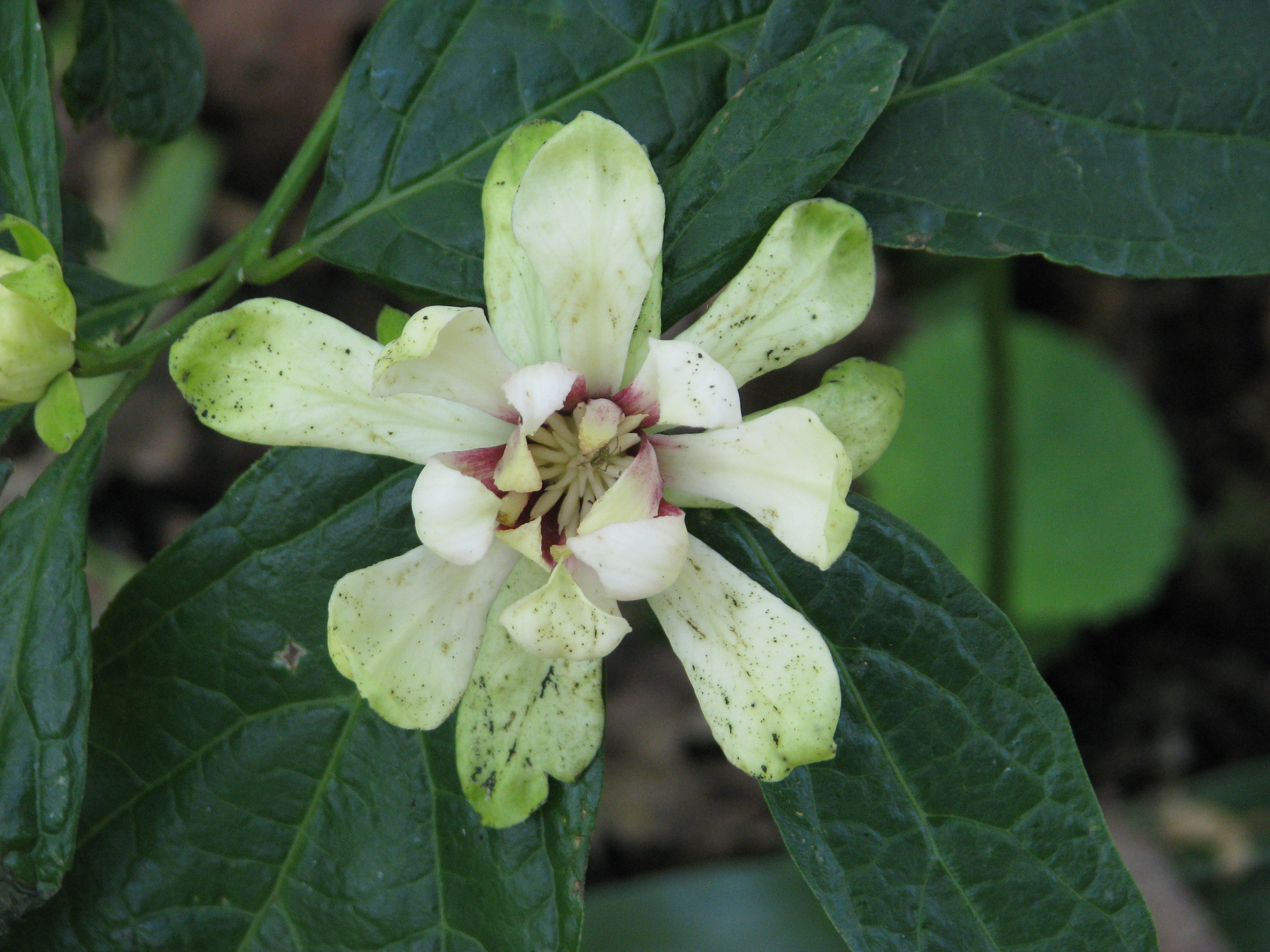
Calycanthus 'Venus'

== Other uses ==
Calycanthus floridus and C. occidentalis were both used as a traditional medicinal plant by Native Americans. The indigenous peoples of California also used C. occidentalis in basketweaving and for arrow shafts.

=== Essential oils ===
Calycanthus oil, distilled from the flowers, is an essential oil used in some quality perfumes.
