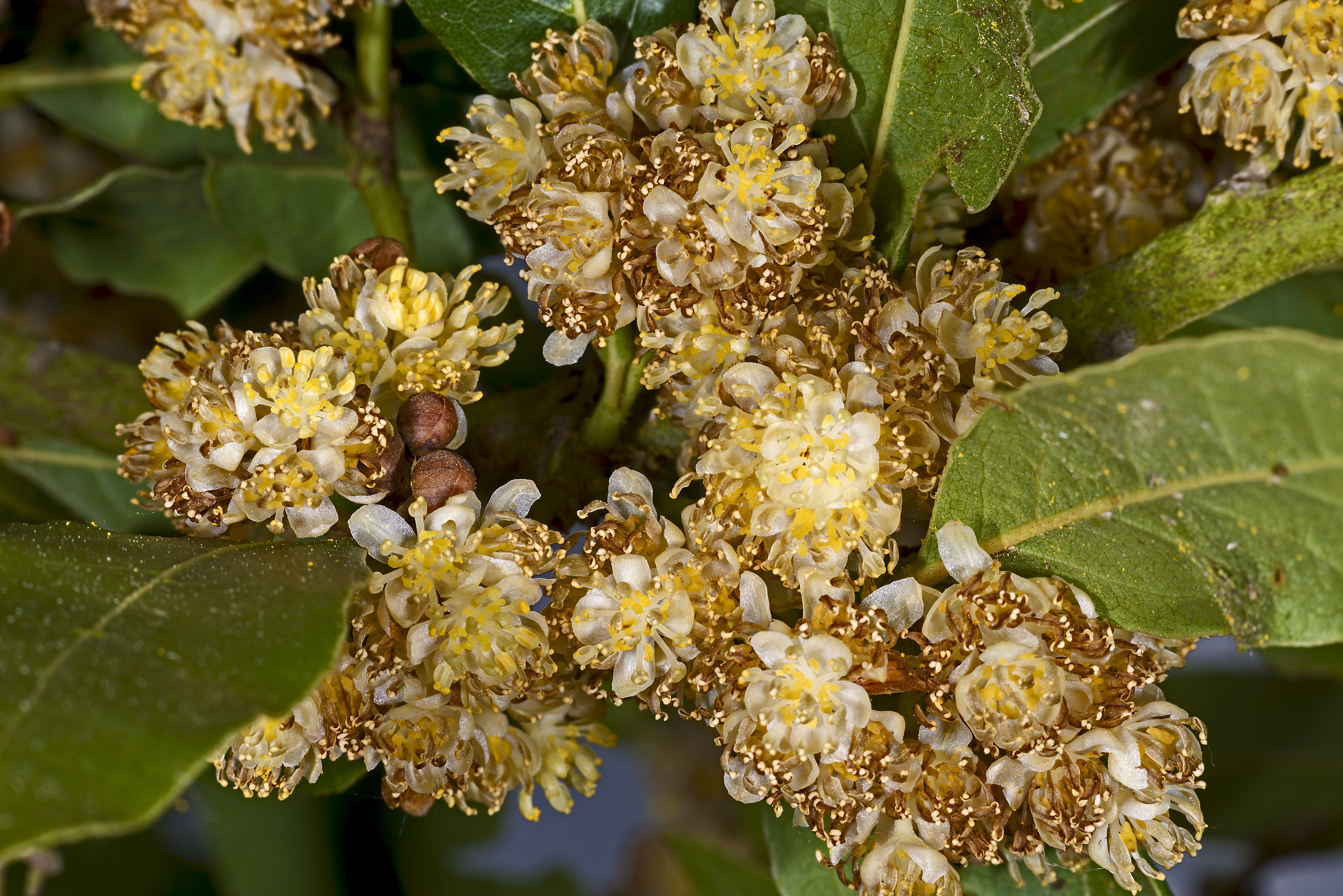
- Laurus nobilis flowers and leaves

Scientific classification
- Kingdom: Plantae
- Clade: Embryophytes
- Clade: Tracheophytes
- Clade: Angiosperms
- Clade: Magnoliids
- Order: Laurales; Juss. ex Bercht. & J.Presl

Families
- Atherospermataceae; Calycanthaceae; Gomortegaceae; Hernandiaceae; Lauraceae; Monimiaceae; Siparunaceae

= Laurales =

Laurales Temporal range: Aptian - recent

Order of flowering plants

The Laurales are an order of flowering plants. They are magnoliids, related to the Magnoliales.

The order includes about 2500–2800 species from 85 to 90 genera, which comprise seven families of trees and shrubs. Most of the species are tropical and subtropical, though a few genera reach the temperate zone. The best known species in this order are those of the Lauraceae (for example bay laurel, cinnamon, avocado, and Sassafras), and the ornamental shrub Calycanthus of the Calycanthaceae.

The earliest lauraceous fossils are from the early Cretaceous. It is possible that the ancient origin of this order is one of the reasons for its highly diverged morphology. Presently no single morphological property is known, which would unify all the members of Laurales. The presently accepted classification is based on molecular and genetic analysis.

== Classification ==
The first botanist to think of the Laurales as a natural group was H. Hallier in 1905. He viewed them as being derived from the Magnoliales. During some or all of the 20th century, the Laurales generally included Amborella and the plants now classified in Austrobaileyales and Chloranthaceae. They were not removed until the advent of molecular data in the late 20th century; their previous inclusion made it harder to determine the relationships within the Laurales and between the Laurales and other groups.

The following families are included in the Angiosperm Phylogeny Group system (APG III):

order Laurales

family Atherospermataceae
family Calycanthaceae
family Gomortegaceae
family Hernandiaceae
family Lauraceae
family Monimiaceae
family Siparunaceae

- Magnoliids
  - - Canellales
    - Piperales
  - - - Laurales
        - Calycanthaceae
        - - - Siparunaceae
            - - Atherospermataceae
              - Gomortegaceae
          - - Hernandiaceae
            - - Monimiaceae
              - Lauraceae
    - Magnoliales

The current composition and phylogeny of the Laurales.

Under the older Cronquist system, the Laurales included a slightly different set of families (current placement, where different, in brackets):

- Family Amborellaceae (Family Amborellaceae, unplaced)
- Family Calycanthaceae
- Family Gomortegaceae
- Family Hernandiaceae
- Family Idiospermaceae (= Calycanthaceae pro parte)
- Family Lauraceae
- Family Monimiaceae (Cronquist included Atherospermataceae and Siparunaceae in Monimiaceae)
- Family Trimeniaceae (Austrobaileyales)

The extinct family Araripiaceae (containing only the genus Araripia) is known from the Aptian of Brazil.

== Gallery ==
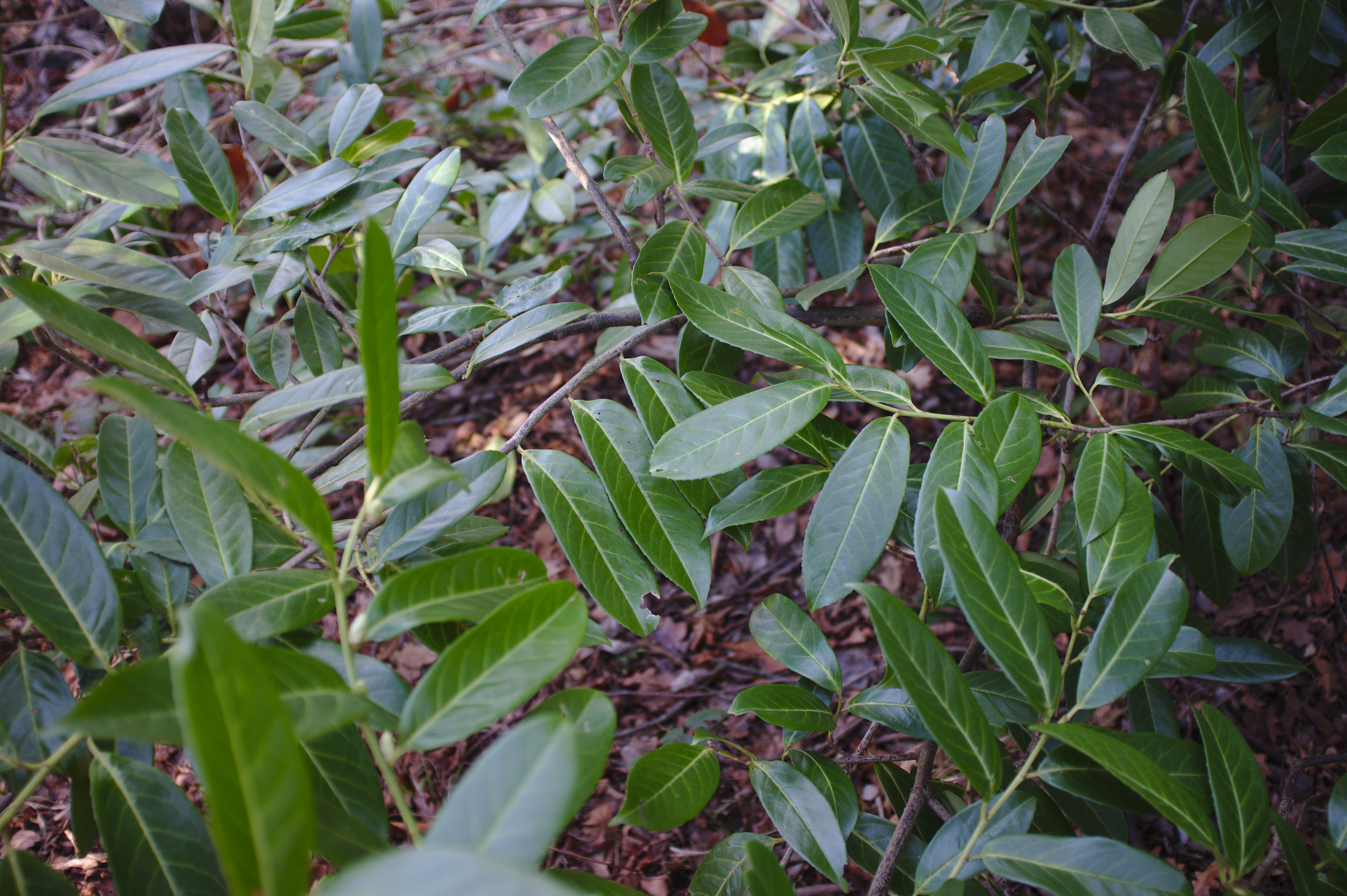
Laurus nobilis (Bay laurel)

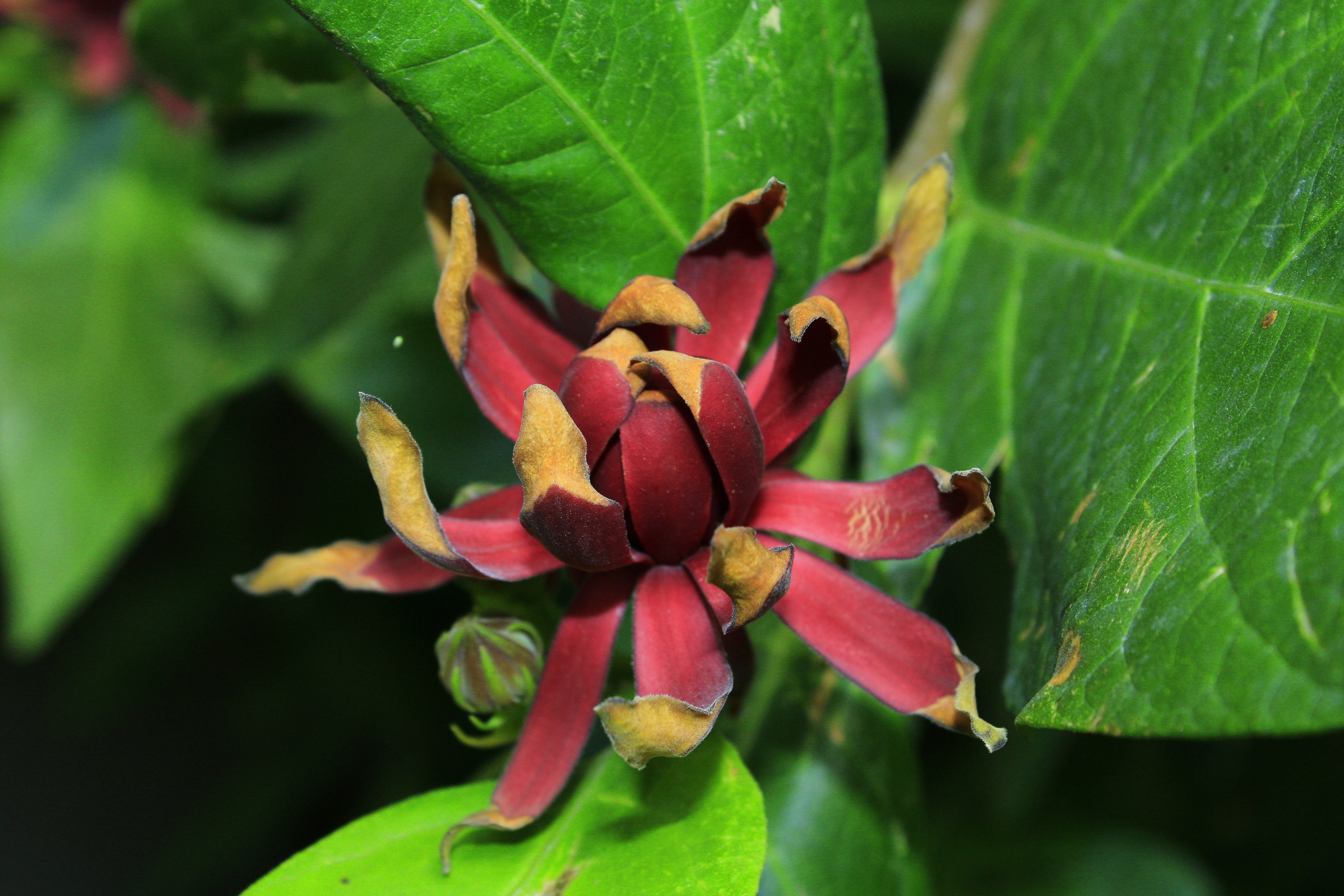
Calycanthus floridus (Sweetshrub)

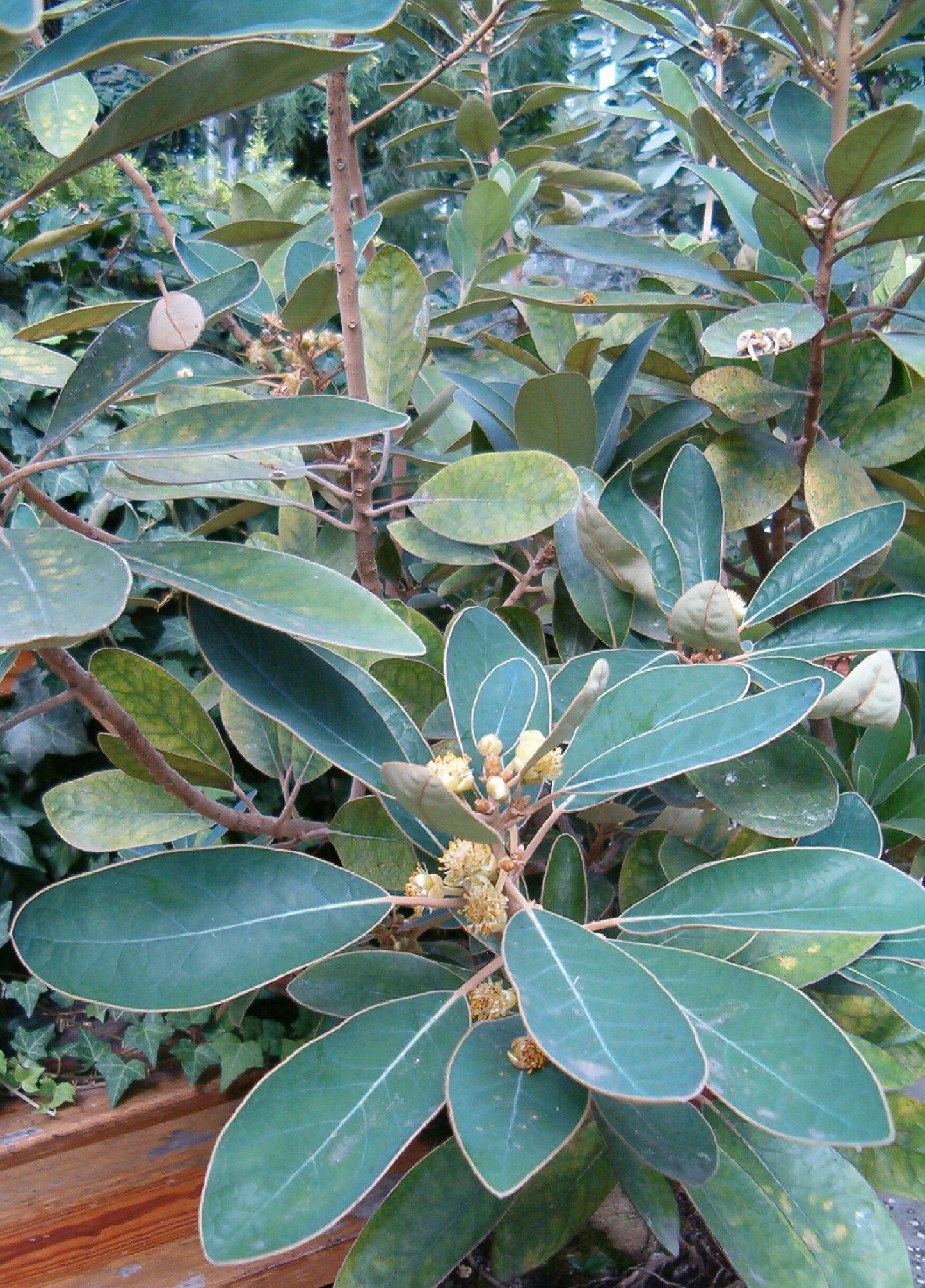
Litsea japonica (Litsea)

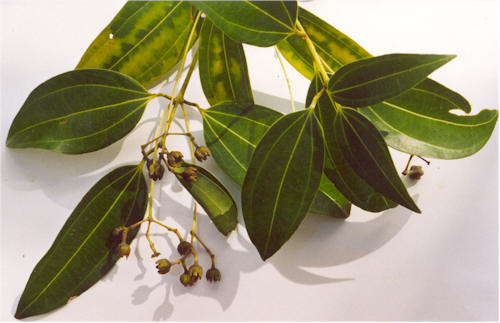
Cinnamomum verum
