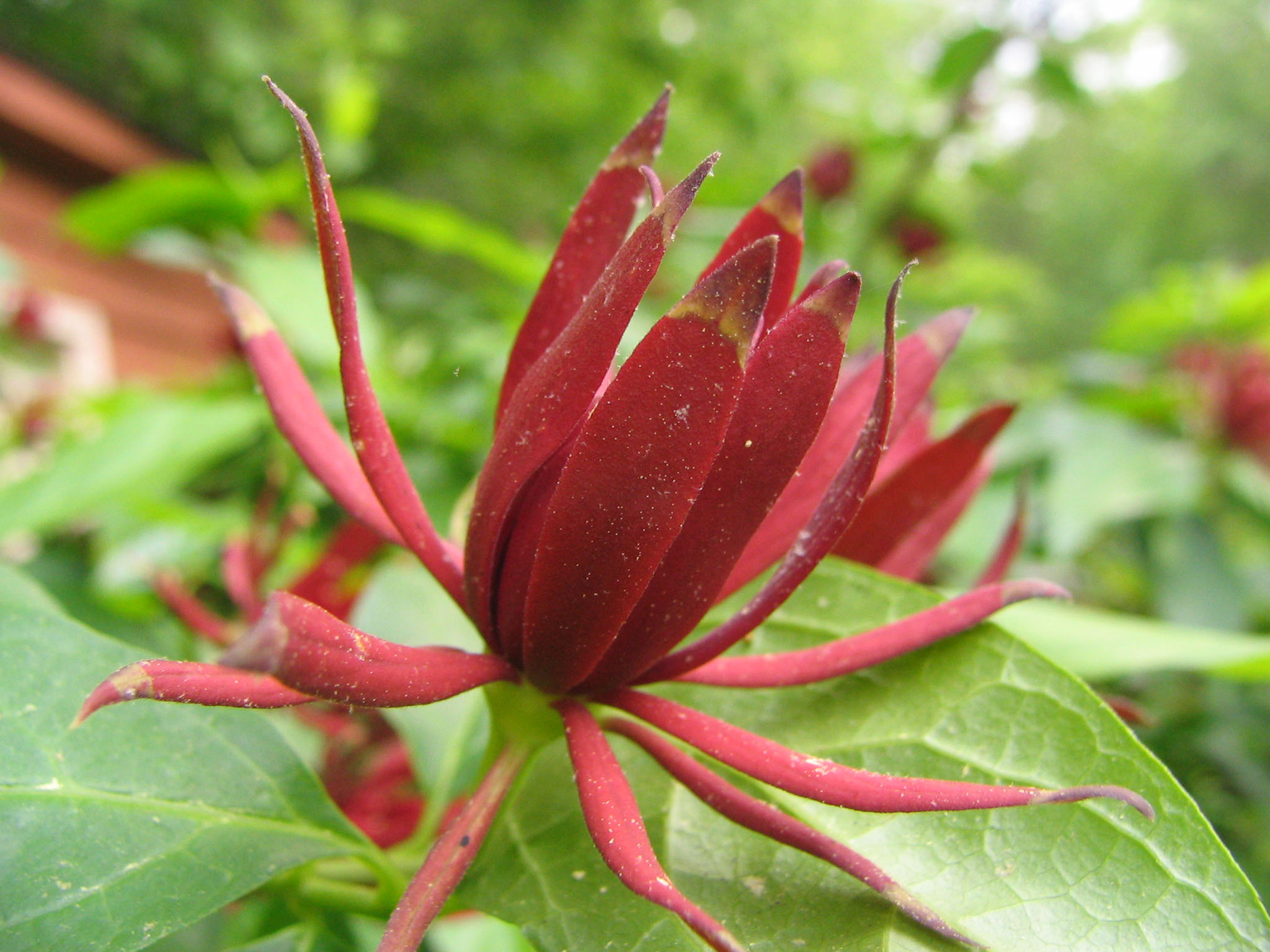
- Calycanthus floridus

Scientific classification
- Kingdom: Plantae
- Clade: Tracheophytes
- Clade: Angiosperms
- Clade: Magnoliids
- Order: Laurales
- Family: Calycanthaceae; Lindl.

Genera
- Calycanthus L. (incl. Sinocalycanthus); Chimonanthus Lindl.; Idiospermum S.T.Blake

= Calycanthaceae =

Calycanthaceae Temporal range: Turonian - recent Possible Aptian record

Family of flowering plants

The Calycanthaceae (sweetshrubs or spicebushes) are a small family of flowering plants in the order Laurales. The family contains three genera and only 10 known species, restricted to warm temperate and tropical regions:

- Calycanthaceae
  - - Calycanthus (three species; western and southeastern North America and one species in eastern Asia)
    - Chimonanthus (six species; eastern Asia)
  - Idiospermum (one species; Queensland, Australia)

They are aromatic, deciduous shrubs growing to 2–4 m tall, except for Idiospermum, which is a large evergreen tree. The flowers are white to red, with spirally arranged tepals. DNA-based phylogenies indicate the Northern Hemisphere Calycanthus and Chimonanthus diverged from each other in the mid-Miocene, while the Australian Idiospermum had already diverged by the Upper Cretaceous and likely represents a remnant of a former Gondwanan distribution of Calycanthaceae.

The oldest definitive fossil of the family is Jerseyanthus from the Turonian of New Jersey; the even earlier Araripia from the Aptian of Brazil and Virginianthus from the Albian of Virginia may also represent members of the family, but may also be stem-Calycanthaceae or more basal Laurales. In 2024, Araripia was placed in its own order, Araripiaceae.

In the APG IV system of 2016, Calycanthaceae is placed in the Laurales order in the magnoliids clade.
