= Iranian rock =

Genre of music

- Other names: Rocka red
- Stylistic origins: Rock and roll; garage rock; pop rock; rock music
- Cultural origins: 1960s, Iran
- Typical instruments: Vocals; electric guitars; electric bass guitar; electronic keyboards; drum kit

Subgenres
- Iranian alternative rock

Regional scenes
- Tehran; Abadan; Astara; Mashhad

Other topics
- Iranian jazz; Iranian pop music; Azerbaijani rock; Armenian rock

Iranian rock (also known as Rocka red) refers to rock music produced by Iranian artists. Rock music has been popular in Iran since the 1960s, with the emergence of singers such as Kourosh Yaghmaei, Farhad Mehrad, Fereydoon Foroughi and Habib Mohebian, but was largely forgotten after the Iranian Revolution. Like most rock styles, electric guitar and bass guitar and drums are the main instruments in this type of music. In some groups, keyboard and piano are very important.

Iranian rock music is influenced by English rock, American rock and European styles. Because of the Iranian performers of this music, various types of Iranian rhythms and tones in this genre are separated from other rock genres. Iranian rock was banned after the Islamic revolution of 1979, and apart from a small number of artists, this style of music still has many problems in Iran.

== Early years ==
Rock music was introduced in Iran by the 1960s, together with the arrival of other Western musical genres in the country's music industry. Iranian rock music was developed by the emergence of artists such as Farhad Mehrad, Kourosh Yaghmaei, Black Cats, The Dangers and Scorpio(not to be confused with the German Scorpions). It soon grew as a popular musical genre among the young generation, especially at the nightclubs of Tehran and Abadan.

=== Couchini Restaurant ===
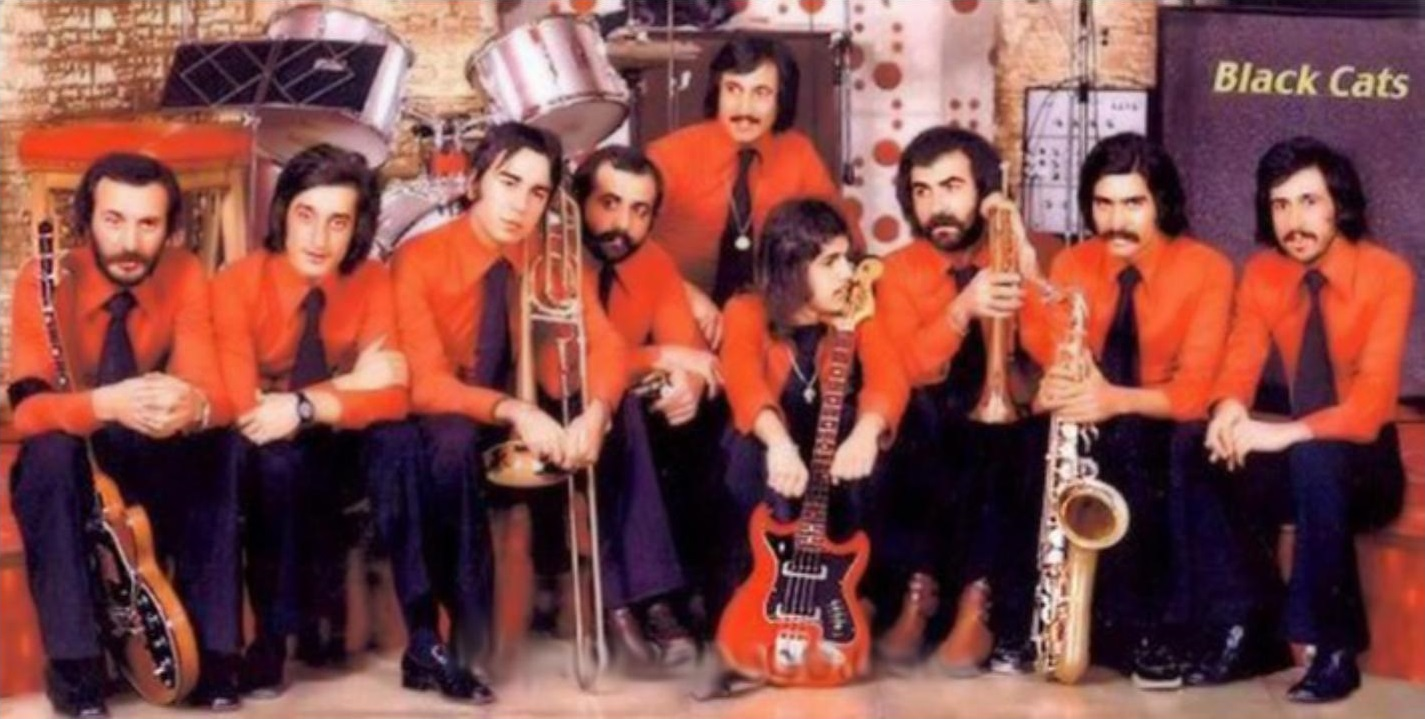
Black Cats in 1969

The origin of many Iranian rock artists, including Farhad and the Black Cats, is Couchini Restaurant. The restaurant was founded by Vida Ghahremani in the early 1960s. Farhad Mehrad played the piano at this restaurant and was the lead singer of the Black Cats group. He also sings the songs of Ray Charles. The Americans in that area had given Farhad the nickname "Ray Charles of Iran". Ebi also performed his first performance at Couchini Restaurant. After the Black Cats became famous, they no longer performed at the restaurant. That's why other groups like Scorpio replaced them. In general, Couchini Restaurant was the most important place to cultivate Iranian rock music.

"Without Couchini Restaurant, rock music would never have grown in Iran, and we would never hear singers like Ebi and Farhad."

— Ebrahim Nabavi, book Basement music Chapter One Page 89.

=== Kourosh Yaghmaei ===
Kourosh Yaghmaei began releasing his albums in 1971. He brought a lot of innovation to Iranian rock. Using the keyboard as the rhythm of the song instead of the guitar is part of this innovation. Kourosh Yaghmaei released two albums before being banned, both of which are important works of Iranian rock. His most important work is Gol-e Yakh. Based on international standards, the flower of ice quickly penetrated beyond the borders of Iran, and thereafter various performances in other countries of the world continued to this day. According to Ebrahim Nabavi (author of the book Basement music): "Kourosh Yaghmaei has had a profound impact on Psychedelic Rock in Iran." Kourosh Yaghmaei is known as the father of Iranian rock because of his deep influence on Iranian rock music. After the Islamic Revolution, Yaghmaei was banned from performing for seventeen years. During that time he worked for children and published books and cassettes. In 1987, he released his fourth solo instrumental album Diar which was recorded without bass, guitar and drums, as dictated by the Iranian government. In addition, Yaghmaei arranged folkloric pieces to be played by the Great National Orchestra.Between 2003 and 2006, Yaghmaei worked with his last studio album titled Malek Jamshid.[17][18] After 12 years of trying to obtain the required permit from the Ministry of Culture and Islamic Guidance, the authority denied to release this album in Iran. Latter in 2016, since two years of restriction not to use types of equipment such as acoustic system, sound engineering, professional microphones, amplifiers, Roland keyboard, electric guitar, 8 track recorder and other necessary equipment[17][9] the album was released by Now-Again in United States and the album was banned by the Iranian government.[8][17]

He released debut compilation Back from the Brink: Pre-Revolution Psychedelic Rock from Iran: 1973–1979 in 2011.[19][20] A two-disc celebration of Yaghmaei's most well-known numbers, recorded between 1973 and 1979, before the Islamic Revolution.[21] In 2018 Nas sampled an Old Persian Song called " Gole Yakh " by @kourosh.yaghmaei for Adam and Eve

=== Habib Mohebian and Fereydoon Foroughi, pioneers of blues rock ===
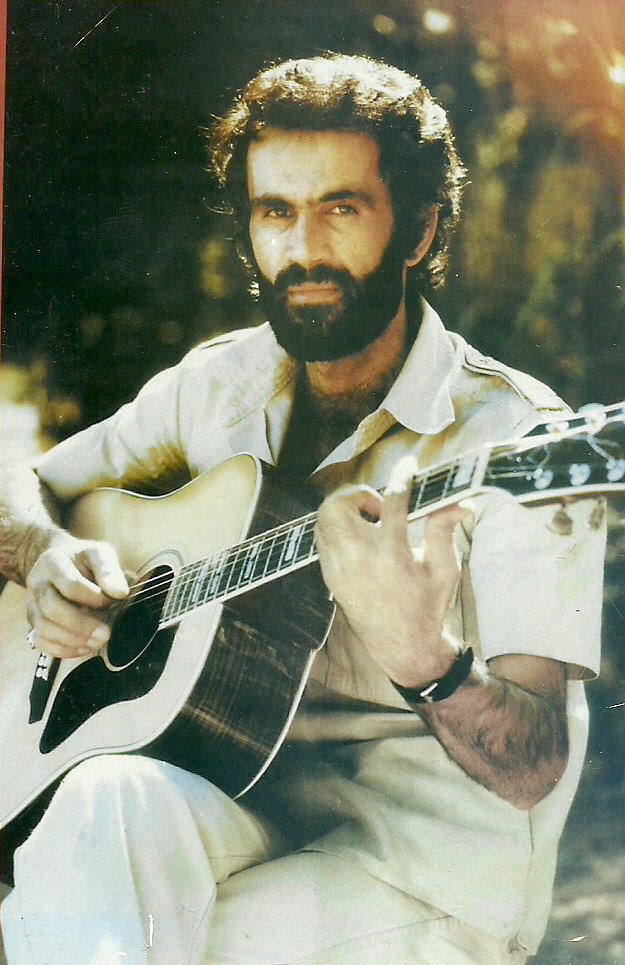
Habib in 1977

Fereydoon Foroughi began his work a year after Farhad Mehrad. His debut album Zendoone Del was one of the first albums of Iranian blues rock. Fereidun Foroughi's scratchy voice greatly contributed to his reputation. His most famous song is "yar dabestani man" sweetheart. Fereydoun Foroughi's work ended with this album. The bad sales of this album made it impossible to release another album. With the Iranian Revolution happening, the voice of Fereydoun Foroughi was never heard again. Although Fereydoon Foroughi's work was not long, his influence on rock music is significant. In 1977, Habib Mohebian began preparing his first album. Four months ago Habib's mother released the album. Habib sang a song called "Mother" because of her mother's death that was used in the album. Habib Mohebian has two other self-titled songs, "Lonely Night Man" and "My Shahla", both of which are on his first album. Until the Iranian Revolution, Habib only

Habib – "Lonely Night Man"
Lonely Night Man, Habib's most famous work

had the opportunity to release another album called Hello Neighbor. After the revolution, Habib stayed in Iran until 1983 and then moved to Los Angeles. His most notable work during this period was "Swamp Crabs", an important work in blues rock. Habib returned to Iran in 2009. Habib did little work until the end of his life and died in 2016.

=== Tehran Sound ===
The number of rock bands gradually increased, each performing in cafes and restaurants. Some of these bands, such as The Raptures, The Robles, The Dangers, and Golden Ring, have released albums. Most of the works published by these groups did not succeed. In time, these rock bands were renamed Tehran Sound. All bands in Tehran Sound released their songs with the Apollo label. But most of them did not succeed. Kamran Yaghmaei, brother of Kourosh Yaghmaei, formed a band that played the songs of Kourosh. Andy started playing music with the band, he played in the Bass Guitar. Tehran Sound had almost disappeared by the dissolution of key groups such as the Golden Ring by 1977. One of the last artists to call themselves a member of Tehran Sound was Faramarz Aslani, who blended flamenco with rock. Tehran Sound ended with the start of the Iranian Revolution.

=== Regional scenes ===
==== Astara ====
In 1969 and 1970 Golden Ring first introduced rock garage into Iranian rock music. As a result, large groups of enthusiasts of this genre were formed throughout Iran. The most important Astara rock band was Cheshm Azar Group, founded by Nasser Cheshm Azar. The song "God of the heavens" is the band's most popular song, which many have covered. Other highlights of Astara are the miracles.

==== Mashhad ====
The Sinners and Pepe Flovy were active rock bands in Mashhad. In 1966, The Sinners performed "(I Can't Get No) Satisfaction" at the hall of Mohammad Reza Shah. Andranik Asaturian formed the Super Five band in 1969. This band was one of the first examples of jazz fusion in Iran. the Super Five lasted only a year.

==== Abadan ====
The Herbs group was formed in Abadan. Some members of this group later joined the Scorpio group. Son Soul Brothers was a group that Martik Kanian and Mehdi Khashe founded. Martik and Mehdi Khashe were both from Abadan, playing guitar for Mehdi Rahmati's orchestra. In 1971, Martik and Mehdi Khasheh were separated from the Mehdi Rahmati Orchestra. Martik and Mehdi Khashe, along with Firouz Sarkarde, Behrouz Lari, Mohammad Moradi and Hossein Hosseini formed the Son Soul Brothers band. The group was originally covering foreign works such as Pastime Paradise. The band have been making their own songs since 1972, with the most successful being "Cheshmaye To" in 1975. "Cheshmaye To" was listed in the number 90 list of my network and you as "Top 100 Persian Songs". Son Soul Brothers was the first Iranian band to perform a disco song. The group was dissolved in 1977.

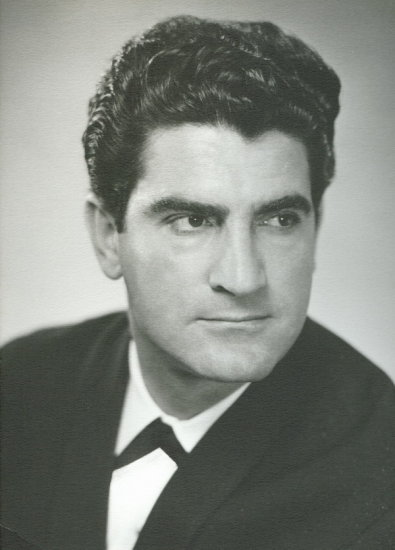
Viguen, known as Sultan of Jazz, was a role model for many Armenian singers.

=== The role of Armenians ===
Viguen was a pioneer in the integration of pop music with Persian poetry. Artoush and his band The Wonders also pioneered the creation of symphony rock in Iran. But Artosh's work was not well known, and Artosh remained anonymous until his death in 2018. Varoujan, a great Armenian musician, had arranged many popular Iranian songs. He died of cardiac arrest in his forties. Like many other Armenian singers, Georges Hvansian tried to imitate Viguen. He became famous for reading Greek works. The Poppy band was one of the first Armenian rock bands. Some of the songs in this band are outstanding. Armenian works are considered influential to Iranian rock music. And still these works have maintained their fame.

== After the 1979 Revolution ==
Rock music started after the revolution and before the presence of internet activities in the era of President Rafsanjani with the performance of Kaveh Yaghmaei and Babak Amini in Tehran. Kaveh Yaghmai performed rock music and sold tickets for the first time in Tehran, which was met with great reception from the people.

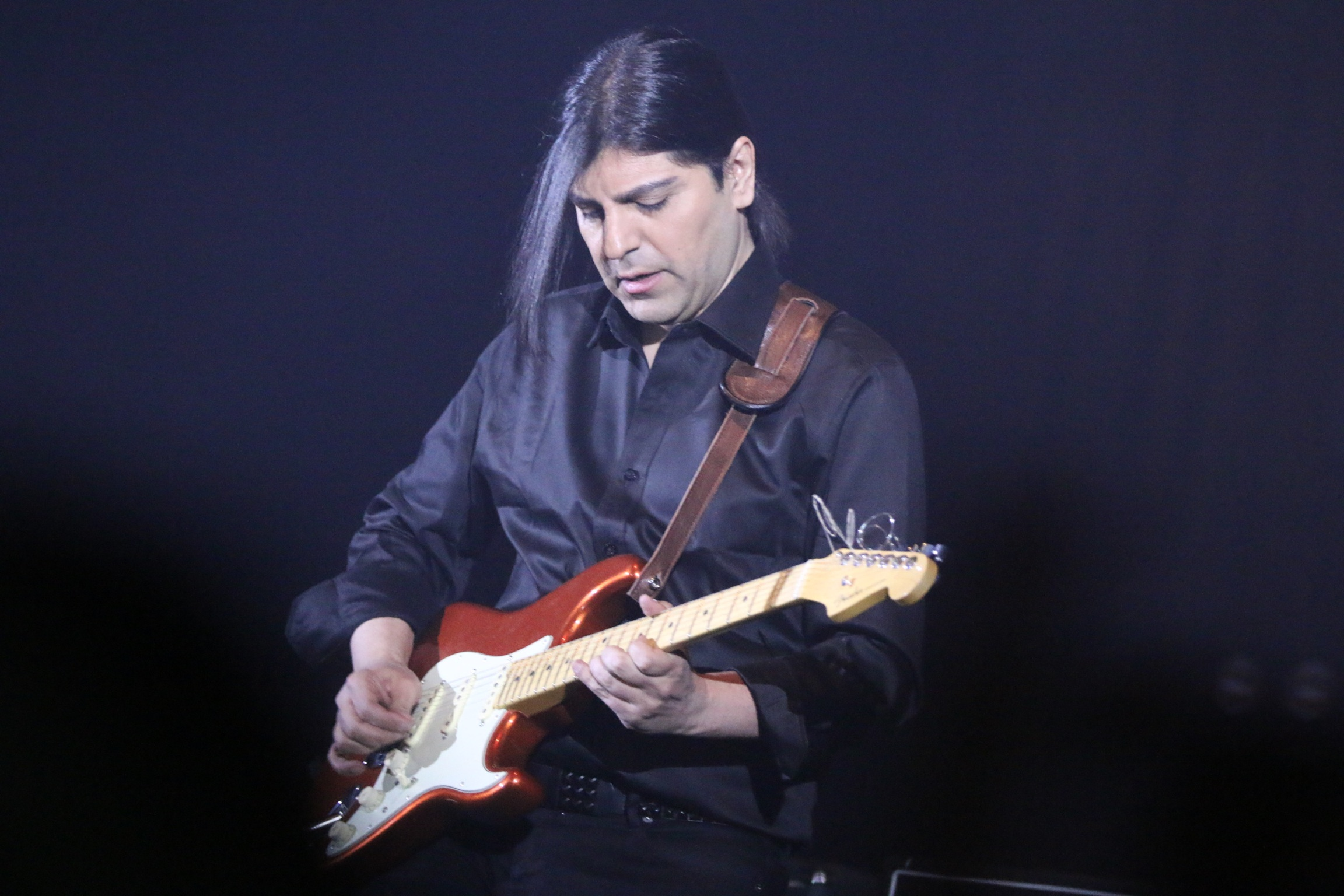
Kaveh Yaghmaei 2019 Tehran

== Kaveh Yaghmaei ==
Kaveh Yaghmaei is one of the most influential Iranian musicians, composers, and arrangers since the 1979 Islamic Revolution. He is recognized for revitalizing rock music in Iran and blending Western and Iranian musical traditions.

=== Early life and education ===
Kaveh was born into a musical family and is the son of Kourosh Yaghmaei, a legendary Iranian musician and pioneer of psychedelic rock. He began playing guitar at the age of eight and attended the Tehran Conservatory of Music, the most prestigious music school in Iran before the 1979 revolution. After the temporary closure of music schools, Kaveh continued his education under his father’s guidance.

He later earned a Bachelor of Arts in Classical Guitar from Azad University of Tehran. During his formative years, he developed a strong interest in progressive rock, a style not formally taught in Iran at the time. His musical influences include Baroque and Classical music, as well as rock icons such as Deep Purple, Rush, Supermax, Jethro Tull, Jeff Beck, AC/DC, Camel, The Ventures, Dire Straits, Elton John, Pink Floyd, Alan Parsons, and Eric Clapton.

=== Career ===
Kaveh Yaghmaei emerged as a leading figure in Iran’s post-revolution rock scene. He became known for his innovative arrangements, live performances, and fusion of Western rock styles with Iranian musical elements.

He has collaborated with both Iranian and international artists, contributing guitars, vocals, and arrangements to various projects. Several of his works have been remixed by international musicians, including Kanye West and Nas, and have been translated into multiple languages, including French, German, Arabic, and English.

=== Notable albums and singles ===
- Matarsak (2003, U.S.) – Kaveh’s first solo album, which became one of Iran’s best-selling pop albums. An official concert DVD was also released, marking the first professional multitrack concert recording in Iran.
- Sokoot-e Sard (Cold Silence, 2007, U.S.) – His second album, released through Taraneh Records; featured songs that entered the PMC TV Top Twenty chart, with Avalin Harf reaching #1.
- Manshour (2016) – Became the bestselling pop-rock album in Iran that year.
- Adamhaye Shabzadeh (2021) – Released internationally.
- Singles: Mard e Ankabooti (Rock and Acoustic versions, 2022), Safar (with Shahrokh Izadkhah, 2017), Kouleh (2017), Dejavu (2017), and Havaye Taze (2024).

=== Collaborations and international work ===
Kaveh has performed with musicians from Canada and the U.S., including Daniel Adair, Brian Poulsen, and Ben Kaplan. His concerts have taken place in Iran, Canada, and other countries, bridging Iranian music with global audiences.

=== Political and social activism ===
Since 2019, Kaveh Yaghmaei has been actively engaged in cultural and musical initiatives supporting freedom and human rights in Iran. Through his compositions, collaborations, and live performances—both in Iran and internationally—he has contributed to raising awareness about the struggles of women and artists under oppressive regimes. His work often addresses themes of exile, censorship, and resistance, reflecting his personal experiences and his ongoing commitment to artistic freedom.

=== Awards and recognition ===
- Winner of multiple Barbod awards for songwriting and arrangement.
- Recognized as a leading figure in reviving Iranian rock music post-1979.
- His album Manshour (2016), the bestselling pop-rock album in Iran, received the following awards:
  - 2017 International Fajr Music Festival Award for Best Pop Album of the Year
  - 2017 Musicema Festival Award for Best Pop-Rock Album of the Year (based on the opinions of music experts and notable professional musicians)
  - 2017 Musicema Barbod and Nakisa Award for Best Pop-Rock Album of the Year (based on the opinions of music experts and notable professional musicians)
  - 2017 Chelcheragh People’s Choice Award for Best Lyrics

=== Musical style ===
Kaveh Yaghmaei is known for his technical guitar skills, intricate arrangements, and fusion of Western rock, classical music, and Iranian traditional motifs. His works span progressive rock, pop-rock, acoustic, and orchestral styles.

=== Alternative rock ===
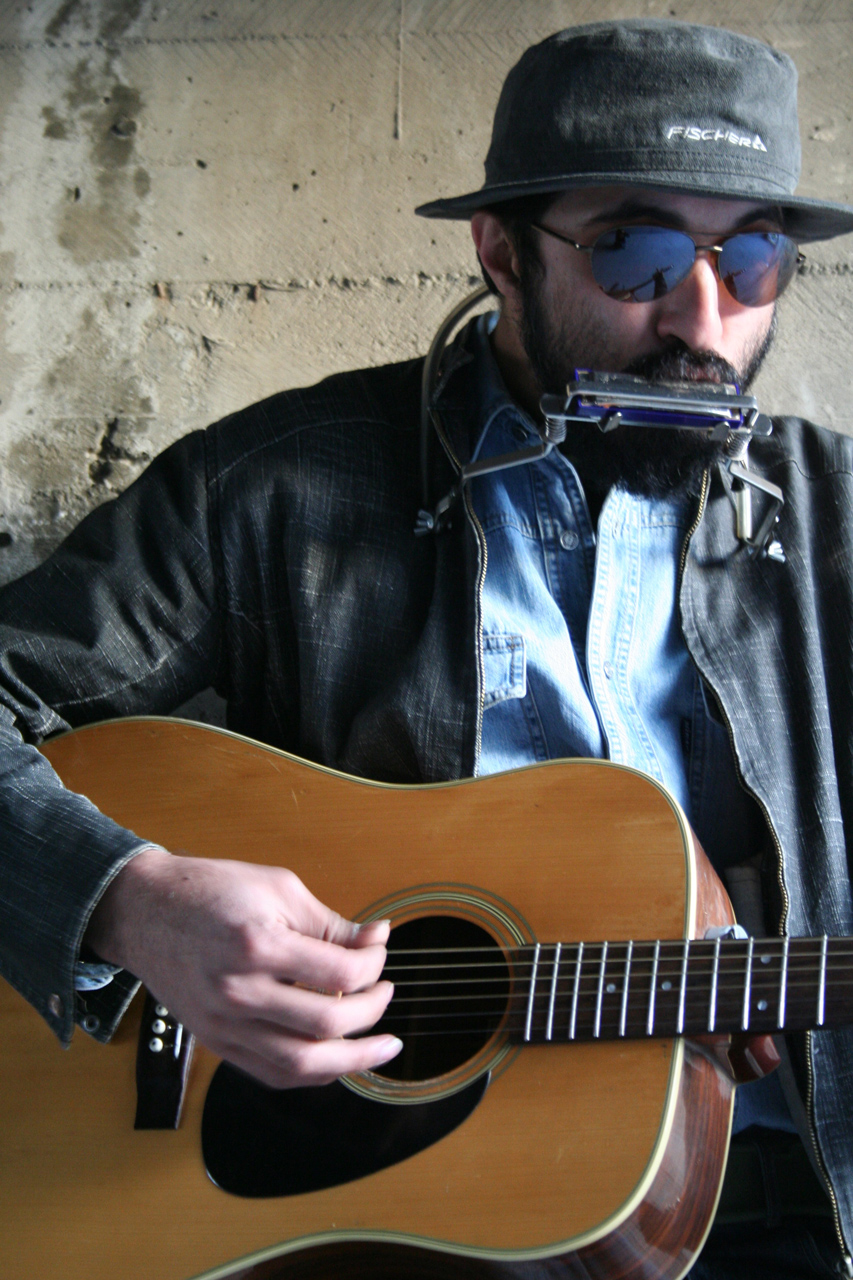
Abdi behravanfar had a profound impact on Iranian alternative music and later folk rock.

Alternative rock in Iran has a tumultuous history. Following, Abdi Behravanfar, the O-Hum and Comment Band groups began to make alternative works. Alternative bands, like other rock genres, operate underground in Iran. Alternative rock bands with roots and blues, psychedelic, and garage rock influences created a thick and powerful sound making use of highly amplified distortion, extended guitar solos, high beats, and overall loudness. The lyrical themes of these groups are mostly related to the consequences of the mechanization of life, life and death, and protest against capitalist governments. The heavy rhythms and defiant lyrics made this style popular in Iran. B-band is one of the most influential bands of this genre and is considered a pioneer of Iranian alternative rock. The music of bands like B-band incorporates traditional Iranian melodies as well as elements of jazz music. Their lyrics tend to speak of their own cultural and personal experiences, and reflect on the loneliness, hope and despair of the world at large.

=== Heavy Metal and Hard rock ===
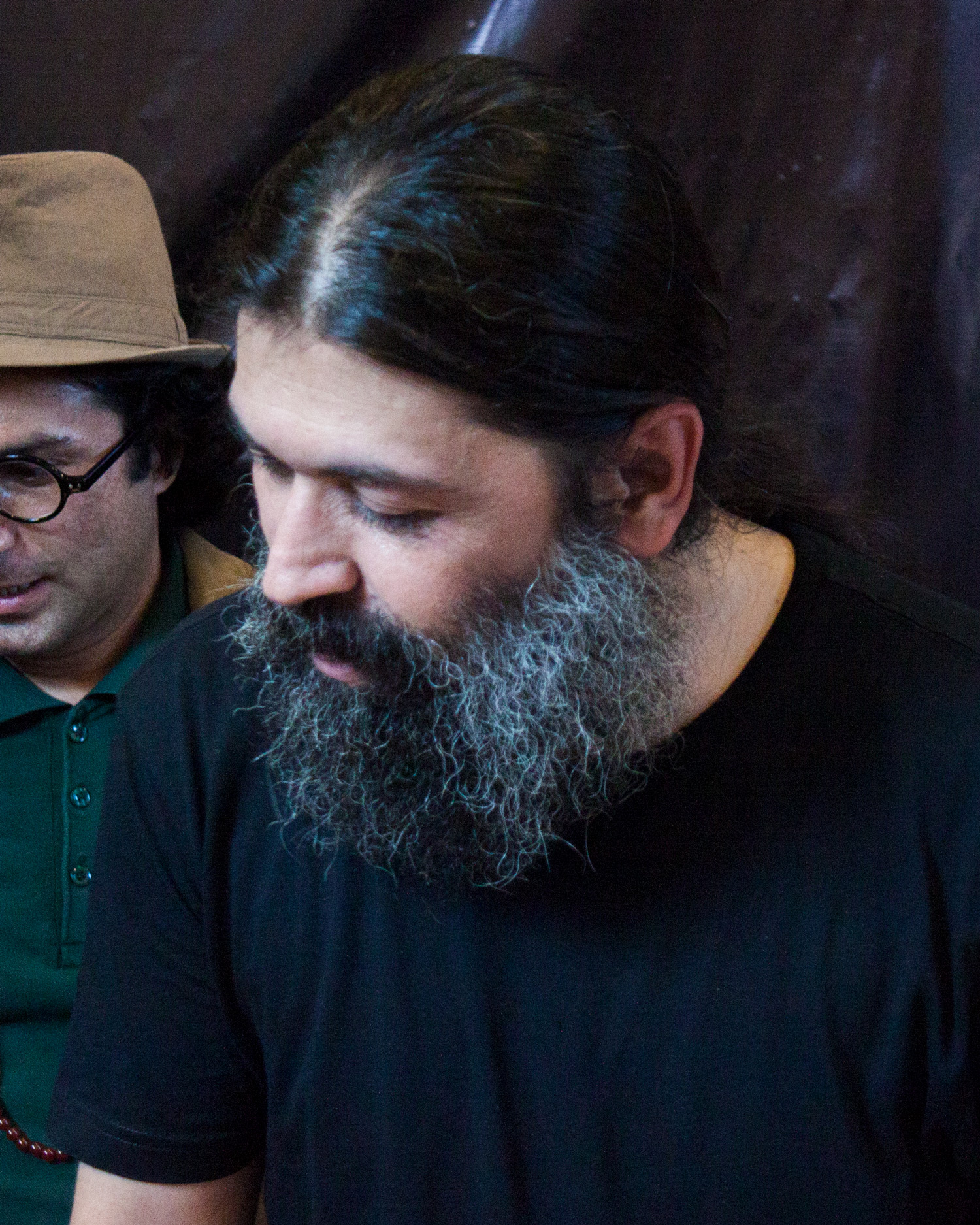
Farshid Arabi, Iranian Heavy Metal singer.

The inspiration for many of Iran's hard rock songs of the 1970s were bands like Cream, The Who and above all The Jimi Hendrix Experience. With the victory of the Iranian Revolution, heavy metal and hard rock in Iran disappeared for a while. After the 1979 Revolution, Iran engaged in an eight-year war with Iraq. It was at this time that some Iranian youths, led by Farshid Arabi, were playing unauthorized heavy metal. Over time, Farshid Arabi formed a group called Silent Death and continued to operate underground. The most important source of inspiration for Farshid Arabi and his band was Black Sabbath, which later became the source of inspiration for many Iranian metal bands. By the beginning of the 1990s, heavy metal has grown in Iran and gained many fans and supporters. During this period, the works of the Grunge bands were sold underground in Iran, the works of Nirvana group being the most popular and best-selling. Many bands formed during this period in Iran such as Baramant, Kahtmayan, Angband, Mordab, Arsames and Master of Persia. Heavy metal and hard rock music are illegal like many other rock styles in Iran. but in recent years some bands like Gereh received permission to play concerts in Tehran.

=== Hypernova and the globalization of Iranian rock music ===
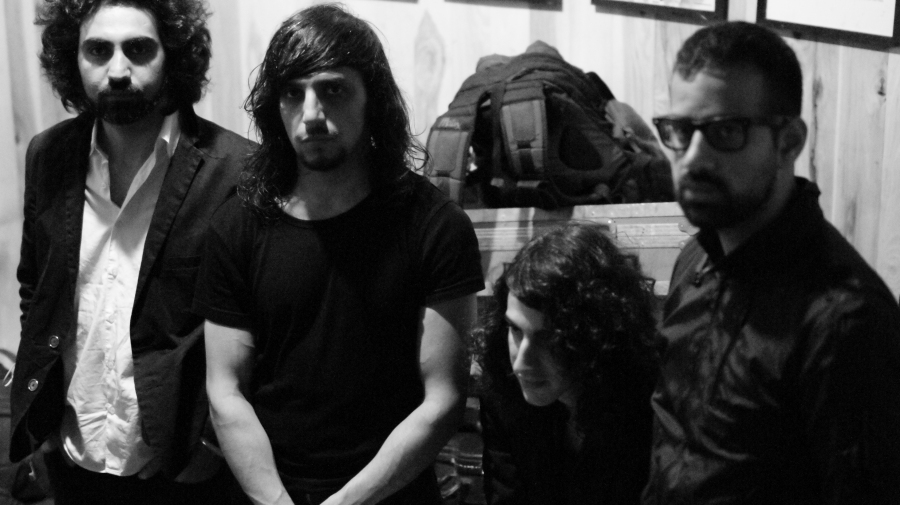
Hypernova From left to right: Jam, Kami, Kodi Najm, King Raam

Hypernova was formed in 2006 by King Raam. This band can be called the flagship of Iranian rock, not only because it is Iranian but also accepted by some of the most famous rock bands in America. Hypernova was the first Iranian rock band to make an album with an American music company. King Raam and Kodi Najm are both successful singers who began their work with the band. King Raam's father, Kavous Seyed-Emami, died in 2018 suspiciously, and King Raam left Iran permanently.

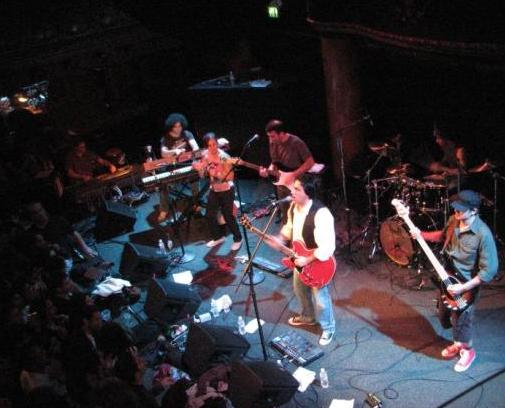
Kiosk Band Running

=== Kiosk and political currents ===
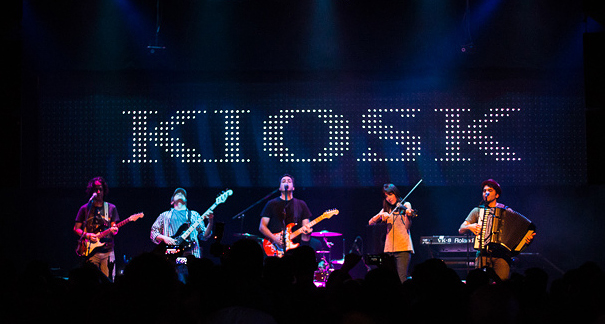

Kiosk has become the largest Iranian rock band during the following years. The band strives to present critical and social songs in a different music format, with blues and jazz music being played. Arash Sobhani is among thirty Iranians who have welcomed US President Donald Trump's tough stance against the Iranian government. The publication of the letter sparked a wave of criticism against the writers of the letter, and some condemned it as "traitor" or "homeland salesman." After the release of Ardalan Payvar broke his way from Arash Sobhani. The name of the band, Kiosk, stems from the original formation of the group in Tehran, when its members gathered together in any possible makeshift space or “Kiosk” to play their music without fear of arrest.

=== Mohsen Namjoo and his influences on rock music ===
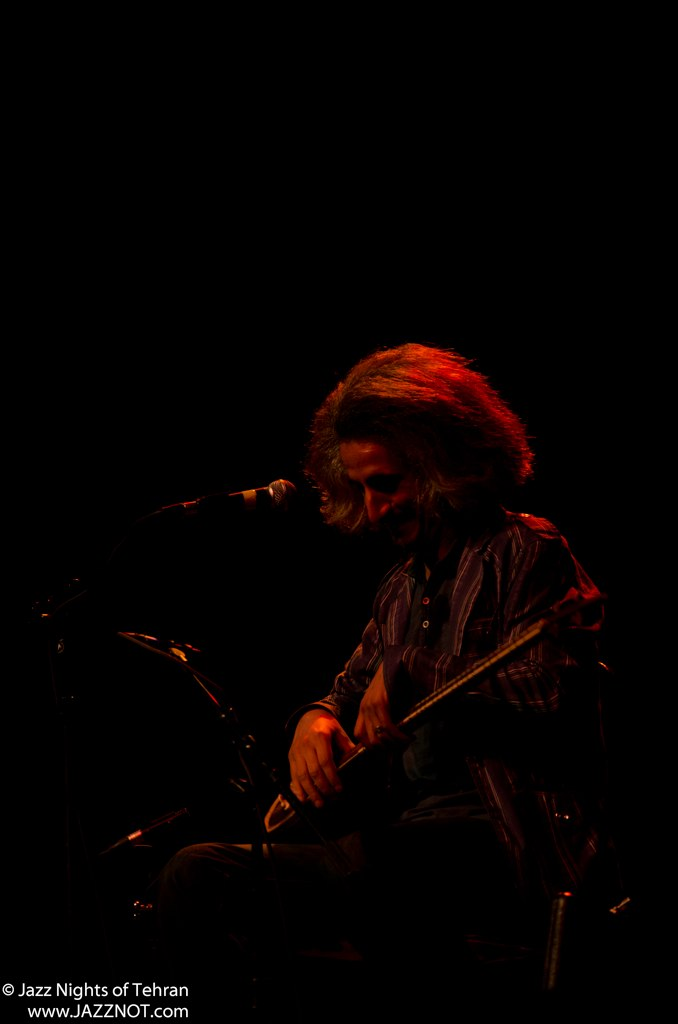
Mohsen Namjoo Running

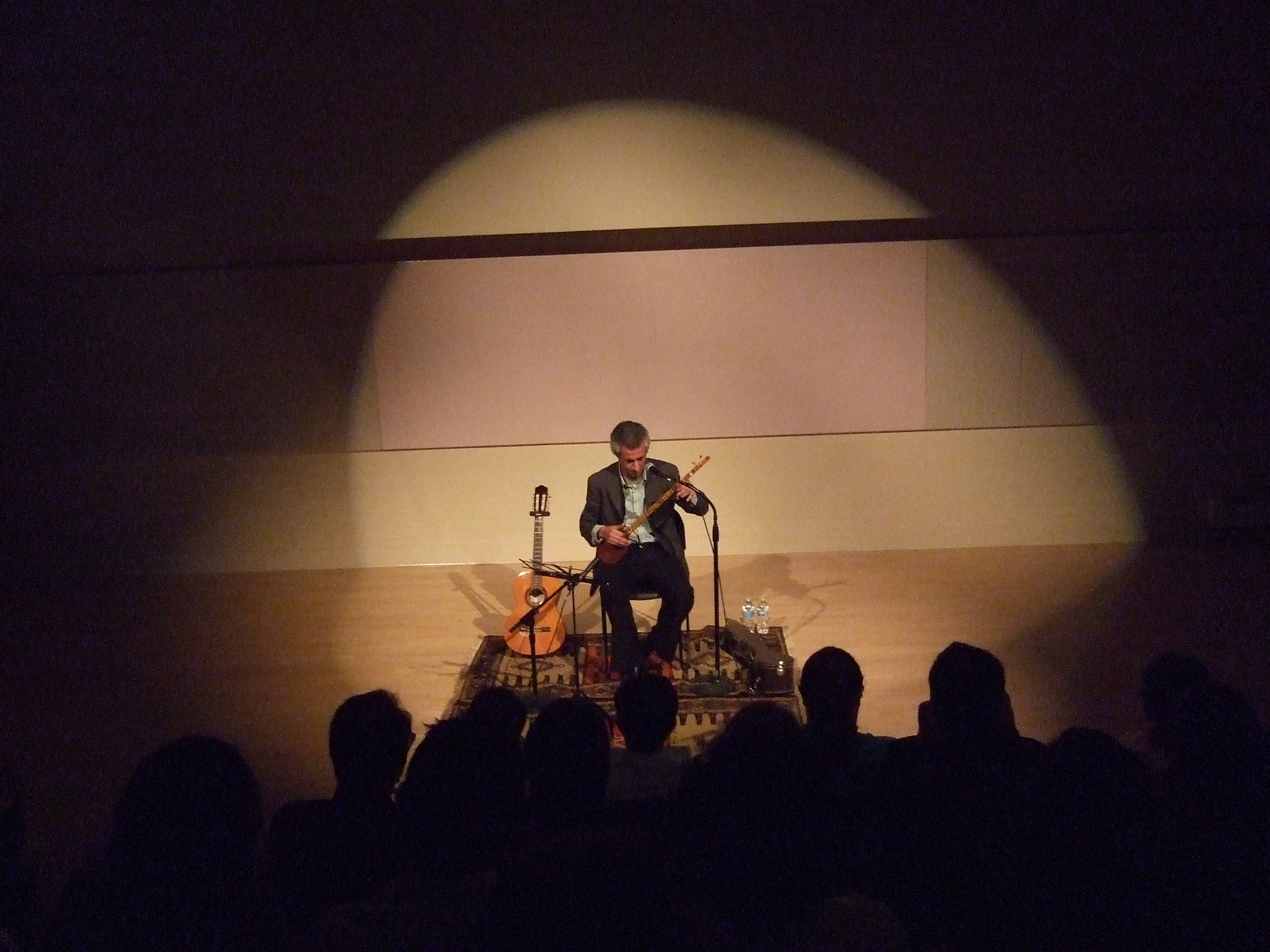
Namjoo in concert in Illinois.

Mohsen Namjoo has introduced a lot of innovations in this style since 1993 when he entered Iranian rock music. Although she speaks boldly, she is very popular. An Iranian correspondent for The New York Times in Iran wrote that "some call him a sort of Bob Dylan of Iran". In fall 2014, Namjoo taught “Revolution and Poets: Content and Form in Iranian Poetry.” Organized by Middle East Studies, Brown, he took part in a panel discussion on Protest Music/ Music Performance and Social Change on Thursday, November 13, as well as taking the lead on assembling a couple of Iranian bands, banned from playing in their own country, who came together for the first time in an Iranian Music Festival titled “Iran Underground” on November 15 at RISD Auditorium. The event was part of Brown's 250th Anniversary events. Mohsen Namjoo's particular style has not been able to be critically criticized because of his lack of familiarity with the basics of music. On one or two occasions, Mohsen Namjoo's supporters were criticized inside Iran, and the hearings were forced to be canceled, and Mohsen Namjoo himself was silent. By reading verses from the Qur'an (suras al-Shams), Namjoo made allergies to himself. Some websites reported Namjoo's conviction by the Tehran General Court to five years in prison for insulting the sacred, mockery of the Qur'anic verses (Shams' song) and defaming the Muslim Bible. In an interview with the BBC, he did not rule out a reporter's possibility of linking the conviction to his recent work, including a desert clip (which he presented to protesters during the 2009 presidential election).

=== Kaveh Afagh and Iranian pop rock ===
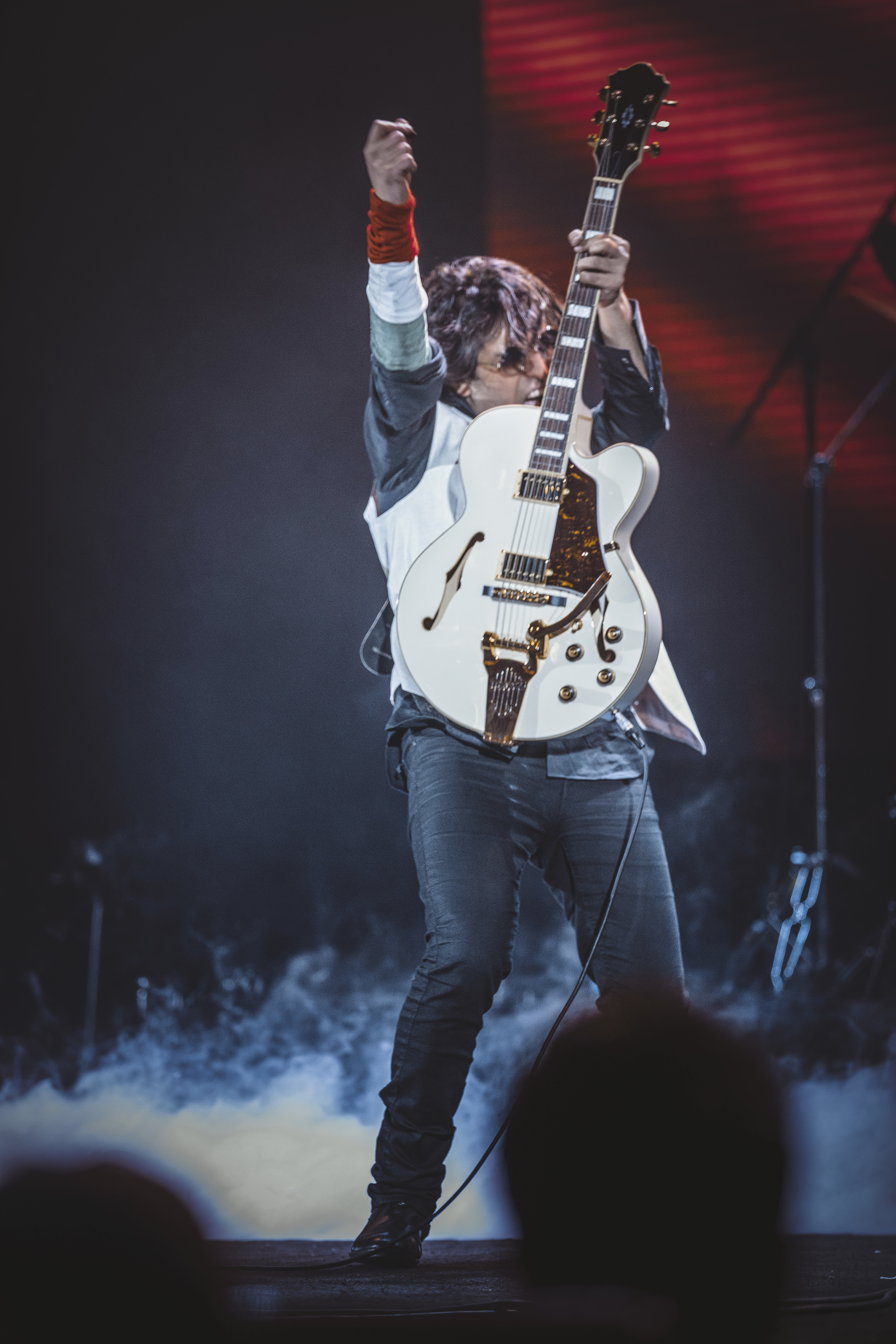

Kaveh Afagh was part of The Ways band but left in 2011. Afagh is the first rock singer in post-Islamic Revolution Iran to obtain an activity license, which he obtained after being banned for ten years from performing. He remains one of the country's most prominent rock singers. Aside from his music, Afagh has also exhibited his artwork in several art galleries. He has performed many concerts abroad and in Iran. Kaveh Afagh song collection "Tehran-57" has been released as the first Persian rock song collection in 2017. Kaveh performed a selection of his songs for the first time on the Milad Tower Stage for the first time at the Resistance 92 Festival and eventually received the festival's first prize in live performance.

== See also ==
- Music of Iran
