= Through the Chaos =

Studio album by Hypernova
- Released: April 6, 2010 (USA)
- Recorded: February 2008
- Genres: Indie rock, new wave, post-punk
- Length: 36:15; 51:04 (iTunes deluxe edition)
- Label: Narnack Records
- Producer: Herwig Maurer

Singles from Through the Chaos
- 1. "Fairy Tales" Released: March 2, 2010 (USA)

Through the Chaos is Hypernova's debut album and was released April 6, 2010 on Narnack Records. The album is produced by Herwig Maurer and mixed/engineered by Sean Beavan. The album was recorded, mixed and mastered in 2008 but the official release was pushed back to 2010. During this time a few limited edition copies were given out by the band to fans. The limited edition copies of the album were also on sale during their US national tour with The Sisters of Mercy.

== Track listing ==
All tracks are written by King Raam and Kodi Najm.

No.	Title	Length
1.	"Universal"	3:43
2.	"Viva La Resistance"	3:02
3.	"Lost in Space"	3:44
4.	"American Dream"	3:43
5.	"Empty Times"	4:27
6.	"Here and Now"	3:47
7.	"With You"	3:33
8.	"Fairy Tales"	3:52
9.	"Monster in Me"	2:45
10.	"See the Future"	3:30

iTunes deluxe edition
No.	Title	Length
11.	"Somewhere Far Away"	4:17
12.	"Hidden Track"	10:47

== Personnel ==
- King Raam – lead vocals, rhythm guitar
- Kodi Najm – lead guitar, synthesizer, rhythm guitar
- Jam – bass guitar
- Kami – drums, percussion
