= Fereydoon Foroughi =

Iranian singer (1951–2001)

Fereydoon Foroughi فریدون فروغی
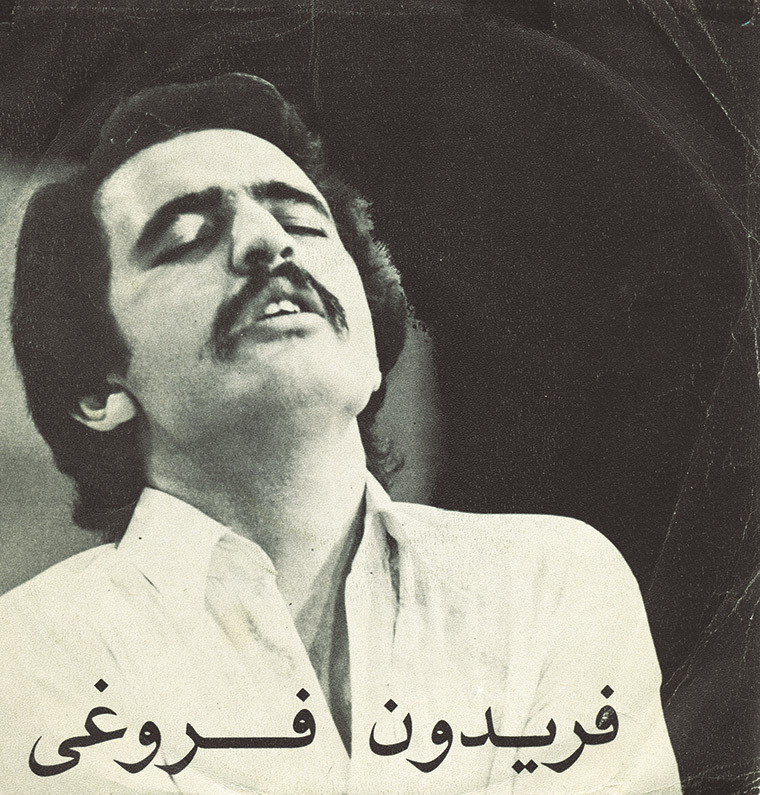

Background information
- Also known as: Fereydoon
- Born: Fereydoon Foroughi; 29 January 1951; Tehran, Iran
- Died: 5 October 2001 (aged 50) Tehranpars, Tehran, Iran
- Genres: Pop, blues
- Occupations: Singer, songwriter
- Instruments: Guitar, piano, tar, drum
- Years active: 1968–1979, 1985–2001
- Labels: Taraneh; Caltex; Avang Records/Avang; MZM Records

Fereydoon Foroughi (Persian: فریدون فروغی; 29 January 1951 – 5 October 2001) was an Iranian singer, musician and composer. He contributed greatly to Iranian music and arts and his unique voice and style soon caught on with the people. In addition to his studies in acting, playing the guitar, piano and organ he also composed music. His style was inspired by jazz and blues.

== Early life and education ==
Fereydoon was born on Monday, January 29, 1951 in the Salsabil neighborhood of Tehran. His father, Fathullah, was a tobacco worker and wrote poetry and strings on his own. His paternal family was one of the great landowners of Naraq. At first, the name Farhad was chosen by his father, but at the request of his grandfather, his name was changed to Fereydoon. He was the fourth and last child of his family after three older sisters, Parvaneh, Effat and Forough.

In 1956, at the age of six, he began his education, and finally in 1968, he received a diploma in natural sciences, after which he dropped out of school. Fereydoon practiced music himself, due to his interest in rock music, especially in Ray Charles.

== Career ==
At the age of 16, Fereydoon began playing music in earnest with a group of musicians, performing popular Western songs and tunes of the day, especially blues music, in various venues. He continued to do so until the age of 18. It is during this period that he gives up music for a while after a love failure, but after this short period of withdrawal, in 1969, the owner of the Kazab's cabaret in Shiraz invited Foroughi and his companions to perform in that place. In the late 1970s, he became a prominent singer in the nightclubs of old Tehran and the star of famous cafes such as the Marquis and Kakouleh.

=== 1970s and playback ===
He started playback work in 1971 with the film Adamak directed by Khosrow Haritash, who realized that he had found the person he was looking for sing. As a result, Fereydoon performed two songs titled "Adamak" and "Parvaneh Man" ("My Butterfly") with the music of Touraj Shabankhani and the lyrics by Labat Vala. After the release of the film, the 45-page pages of these two songs will be offered in famous stores such as Al Cordobs, Pop, Disco, Beethoven and Pars. These two songs blossom and fall on the tongues and Fereydoun becomes famous. Although he was criticized at the time for imitating Farhad's voice, he was no longer overshadowed by the name of his beloved singer, Ray Charles.

After a while, Fereydoun was signed a contract with Farshid Ramzi, the director of the TV show Six and Eight. This collaboration leads to produce songs such as "Zendoone Del" ("Prison of the Heart") and "Sorrow of Loneliness" with poems by Arash Sezavar and composed by William Khno, the former of which makes Foroughi an artist of style. Fetne chakmepoosh directed by Homayoon Bahadoran was the second film in which Foroughi performed a song of the same name in 1972. In the same year, he met and married to Goli Fatorehchi.

In 1973, Amir Naderi's Tangna, with its exhilarating and shocking melodies by Monfaredzadeh, had Foroughi's voice on the credits. In the same year, he performed several songs, the most prominent of which was "Niaz" ("Need"), lyrics by Shahyar Ghanbari and music by Monfardzadeh; a song that leads to the interrogation of all three people by SAVAK. He will perform the song "Fresh Air" in a colorful TV program in the same year.

In 1974, he was perform a song for the film Yaran, played and directed by Farzan Deljou. In the same year Foroughi divorced his wife due to a misunderstanding. After that, he performed the song "Hamisheh Ghayeb" ("Always Absent") with a lyrics by Shahyar Ghanbari, music by William Kheno and arrangement by Varoujan Hakhbandian. The song was previously performed as "Tired Fish".

Gradually becoming an experienced artist, he began to collect his works and released his first album, Zendoone Del. He released his second album called Yaran in 1974. In the same year he was banned from acting for two years due to the performance of the song "Sale Ghahti" ("Year of Famine") by the imperial government. In 1977, after the announcement of political open space by the government, Foroughi released his third album called the Sale Ghahti after a two-year ban. In February of this year, his father died of pneumonia.

=== Islamic revolution ===
In 1978, during Islamic revolution with the deterioration of the political situation in Iran, Foroughi protested against the situation in the country with the release of the album Botshekan. In the same year he performed a song titled "Prostitute", which was never released. In 1979, after the revolution, Foroughi stayed in Iran and performed a concert that included the songs of this concert in Foroughi's album in a new beginning. And "swindler" was not exist in Foroughi's record like them. After the release of this cassette, in 1980, Foroughi performed the song "Yar Dabestani" for the film Az faryad ta teror (From Screaming to Assassination), directed by Mansour Tehrani, which is used in the film's credits. While no official ban has been announced for Foroughi's activities yet, Tehrani has been informed that he must remove Foroughi's voice from the credits of his film. As a result, Jamshid Jam undertakes to sing this song. At the same time, whispers are heard about the ban on Foroughi's activities. He sang the song "Koocheye Shahre Delam" ("Alley of the City of My Heart").

== Death ==
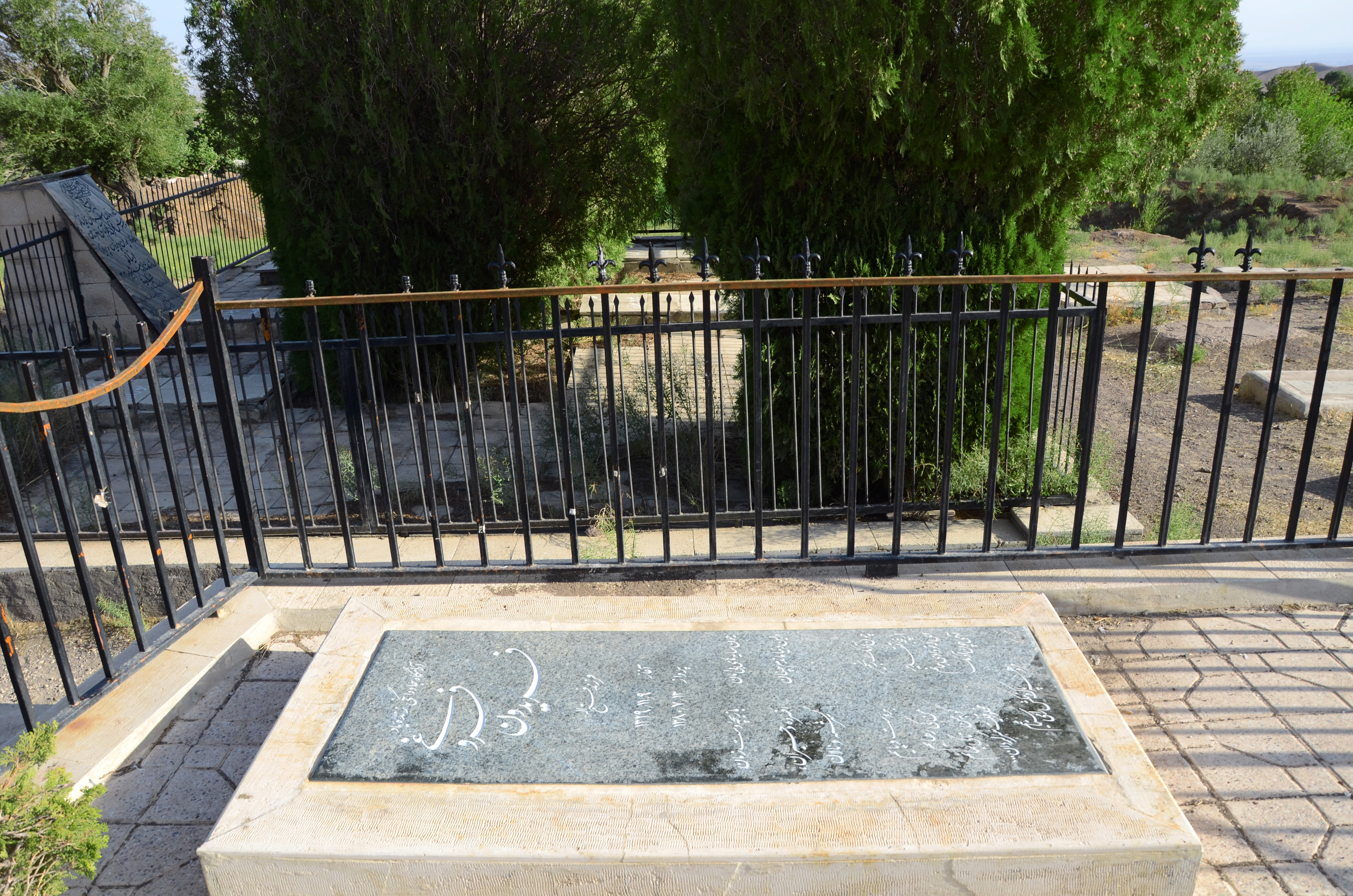
Tomb of Fereydoun at Qurqurak

Fereydoon died of a heart attack at the age of 50 on 5 October 2001 at his home in Tehranpars. He was buried in the village of Qurqurak Buin Zahra in Qazvin, next to small ponds, in the shadow of a large mountain and in the tranquility that he had been waiting for years. Shahyar Ghanbari, singer, songwriter, composer and old friend of Fereydoun, says about his death:

Fereydoun Foroughi dies for the second time. The first time when the man could not sing and the second time when the man wanted to sing. Fereydoun was killed by oblivion and extinction.

— Shahyar Ghanbari

== Discography ==
Studio albums

- Zendoone Del (1972)
- Sale Ghahti (1977)
- Doe Taa Chesm Seyah Dari (1979)

== Filmography ==
- Adamak (1971)
- Fetne chakmepoosh (1972)
- Zan-e bakere (1973)
- Tangna (1973)
- Keyfar (1973)
- Yaran (1974)
