= King Raam =

King Raam کینگ رام
- Born: Raamin Seyed-Emami; April 2, 1981 (age 45); Bushehr, Iran
- Genres: Post-punk; rock; Iranian rock; indie rock
- Instruments: Guitar, vocals
- Website: www.kingraam.com

Ramin Seyed-Emami (Persian: رامین سیدامامی; born in Bushehr, Iran in 1981), better known by his stage name King Raam (Persian: کینگ رام), is an Iranian-born musician and singer and a resident of Vancouver, Canada. Currently, he resides in New York City as part of his enrollment in the musician-in-Residency Program at the New York City Artist Safe Heaven Residency. He is the lead singer for the Iranian punk rock band Hypernova, and he also does solo work under the pseudonym King Raam.

== Early life ==
King Raam was born in 1981 in the coastal city of Bushehr, Iran. His father, Kavous Seyed-Emami, was a professor and eventually relocated the family to Eugene, Oregon to complete his Ph.D. By 1991 the family moved back to Iran.

== Musical career ==
=== Hypernova ===
Hypernova was created in 2000. Bandmates Raam (vocals) and Kami (drums) played extensively in the Tehran underground scene as well as a few small-time international gigs. The line-up changed extensively during this period, and Raam even took a brief sabbatical from the band to study International Relations in Toronto. Hypernova got a break in 2006, playing at the Intergalactic Iranian Music Festival in the Netherlands. In 2007, Hypernova was invited to perform at the South by Southwest Music Festival in Austin, TX. Pooya rejoined the band and Kodi Najm (guitar) and Jam (bass) were added to the line-up. Unfortunately, an international incident involving a group of British soldiers held off the coast of Iran caused a delay in Hypernova's visas. However, their agent was determined to get them to the US and finally enlisted the help of New York Senator Chuck Schumer, who expedited their entry to the United States. Expecting to stay just two weeks, Hypernova brought only their instruments, some clothes and $400. They got a gig at the FatBaby bar on the lower east side of New York, where they garnered attention from MTV and the New York Times. Hypernova continues to tour and has released four albums and their song "Viva La Resistance" is featured on Rock Band 3.

=== King Raam ===
Following the success of Hypernova, Raam created King Raam as a solo project. Collaborating with (poet and artist) Tara Aghdashloo, Esfand, and others, Raam released his first solo album, titled Song of the Wolves in November 2011. His second album, named as The Vulture, released in 2014 containing 14 songs in both Persian and English.

== Return to Iran and leave ==
Raam moved back to Iran in 2014, right after he released his second album. He started working with Sajjad Afsharian in theaters in Tehran. In September 2014 he played some of his songs in his own country for the first time.

In February 2018, Iran's judiciary said that his father, the Iranian-Canadian professor Kavous Seyed-Emami, committed suicide while in detention in Evin Prison, Tehran, because of the evidence against him in a spying case. This claim, including the alleged suicide, has been rejected by his family. Following this event, he had to leave the country again.

The family of Kavous Seyed-Emami, who died under suspicious circumstances while under arrest in Tehran, was planning to flee harassment by authorities there and start a new life in Vancouver, where they have lived before. But at the last minute, his widow, Maryam Mombeini, who is a dual citizen of both Iran and Canada, was temporarily detained. She was prevented from leaving Iran and their two sons had to fly alone, leaving her behind.

One of the sons, Ramin, quickly reached out to friends in Canada, phoning and texting to stay in contact amid the unfolding uncertainty. He also connected with human-rights groups and journalists in New York to tell them about their mother's sudden situation. One of them tweeted a photo that Ramin sent of himself and his brother, Mehran, in their plane seats just before takeoff.

== Podcast ==
In the winter of 2020, Raam started a podcast called "Masty o Rasty;" he shared the podcast to his own site as well as other platforms, such as SoundCloud, Spotify, Apple Music, Telegram, CastBox, and YouTube.

== Other Appearances ==
Raam appeared on the reality TV "Shahs of Sunset", Season 1, Episode 6.

Raam appears onstage with Javaad Alipoor in the play 'Things Hidden Since the Foundation of the World'.
