= O-Hum =

Iranian musical group

- Origin: Tehran, Iran
- Genre: Persian rock alternative rock
- Years active: 1998–present
- Members: Shahram Sharbaf; Nima Ramezan; Saman Vandadi; Roozbeh Gholipour; Pouya Shomali
- Past members: Kasra Ebrahimi; Kasra Saboktakin; Reza Moghadas; Reza Aabaayi; Peter Akoob; Yahya Alkhani; Mani Safikhani
- Website: www.o-hum.com

O-Hum is an Iranian rock band from Tehran, Iran, formed in 1998. The band consists of Shahram Sharbaf (lead vocals, guitar), Nima Ramezan (guitar), Roozbeh Gholipour (drums, percussion), Pouya Shomali (bass), Saman Vandadi (tar, setar, kamanche, daf).

O-Hum has released five albums: Nahal-e Heyrat (1999), Hafez Ashegh Ast (2001), Aloodeh (2005), E-Hum: O-Hum Remixes 1999-2009 (2010), In Kherghe Biandaz (2014). Their musical style is the mixture of western rock music with Persian traditional music, scales and Instruments.

== History ==
=== 1990–1998: Early years and The idea of O-hum ===
Shahram Sharbaf in an interview explained how the idea of the band emerged. He said "I met Shahrokh Izadkhah... and since the very first notes we played together I felt I’ve found the partner I always needed... We got together and made many albums and began dreaming of having a rock band in Iran. In fact, O-Hum’s first album was the fruit and natural continue of what we were doing between 1990 to 1999."

O-Hum means "illusions" in Persian. Sharbaf states that the band name was chosen such that it wouldn't be a cliché after a while, and without any fixed meaning; also such that it could be spelled and written easily in Persian and English.

=== 1998–2001: Formation and Nahal-e Heyrat ===
The band was formed in 1998 in Tehran, Iran. The original members were singer Shahram Sharbaf, guitarist Shahrokh Izadkhah, and bass guitarist Babak Riahipour.

Everything started with the first song Shahram and Shahrokh wrote on acoustic guitar and Sehtar: 'Darvish'.

At first they distributed copies of the songs among friends; Sharbaf states that "copies got hand to hand so fast and things got so hot that even a music company called ‘Tanin Sot’ stepped in and offered a contract." Finally they recorded their first album Nahal-e Heyrat in the summer of 1999 and it was released in October 1999. The album had twelve songs originally, one of them to be later removed from the list [Pire May-foroosh].

=== 2001–2005: Hafez Ashegh Ast ===
O-Hum played its first concert in March 2001 at Russians Orthodox Church in Tehran.

The O-Hum website was launched in March 2001 providing all their songs for free. It received a huge feedback and reception such that it helped the band to be recognized on international scene and play concerts in United States and Europe.

In February 2002 they recorded two singles in BAM studio in Tehran, which later became known as Hafez Ashegh Ast. Later they released the full songs online for free on the occasion of the Iranian new year, Nowruz.

In early 2003 Babak Riahipour decided to step out of O-Hum and continue his personal career. Later in summer 2003 Shahrokh also quit O-Hum and moved to Vancouver, Canada.

Darvish Video clip was released in fall of 2003 via O-Hum.com and soon became a hit.

In spring of 2004, O-Hum traveled to Germany for a couple of concerts in Berlin, Hamburg and Rostock. They played in House of Culture in Berlin, and Fabrik in Hamburg.

On December 5, 2004, O-Hum performed their first official concert inside Iran on World AIDS Day in amphitheater of Tehran's heart hospital.

=== 2005–2010: Aloodeh ===
Shahram began the recording of O-Hum's new album in early 2004 and soon prepared fourteen tracks for the album which later became Aloodeh. Kasra Ebrahimi, Shahrokh Izadkhah, Kasra Saboktakin and guest appearances by traditional musicians helped Shahram to create O-Hum's new effort. Bamahang Productions, a music company in Canada, released Aloodeh on 20 December 2005 worldwide. It received a great welcome both locally and overseas.

During 2004 to 2008 the band was busy playing several concerts in Berlin, Hamburg, Frankfurt, Rostock, Amsterdam and New York. On October 22, 2006, they attended the Iranian Intergalactic Music Festival in Zaandam, Netherlands.

=== 2010–2014: E-Hum: O-Hum Remixes 1999-2009 ===
Sharbaf says at the time when the fans were expecting their next album, he was in a situation that they couldn't record a fresh new album. So he decided to release the E-Hum album which was the remix of electronic performance of most popular songs of O-Hum. Their goal was to satisfy their fans and attract the youth for which they were successful. After the release of E-Hum, they performed concerts in UK.

In September 2012, they performed a concert in cultural complex of Azadi tower. They performed for 3 days and 6 showtimes with new members of the band, which was welcomed by fans.

=== 2014–2022: In Kherghe Biandaz ===
Their album In Kherghe Biandaz was released by Nashr-e Nofe on March 8, 2014. O-Hum's new album which is the band's first official work in Iran was the best seller of "fusion music" inside Iran for months. The album contains 10 music pieces and is of 50 minutes.

Live performance of In Kherghe Biandaz was done in spring and summer of 2014 in Tehran's Azadi Tower Complex.

=== 2022–present: Shatt-e Sharab ===
Their latest album Shatt-e Sharab was officially released on March 8, 2022. It was accessible through O-Hum and Shahram Sharbaf websites. They began their work on the album in autumn 2021, where like their very first album, the three members, Shahram, Babak and Shahrokh, were all reunited again.

== Musical style ==
O-Hum music is a mix of western rock music with Persian traditional music, scales and Instruments. Their style is called “Persian Rock”, combining western rock with Persian instruments and modes. Lyrics are taken from Iranian poets Hafez and Rumi.

Shahram Sharbaf stated that the idea of mixing rock music with Iranian music was something which had been done some years before them by musicians like Arash Mitooee however with less success.

Sharbaf says: "But for O-Hum I had two reasons in my mind: the major one was about mixing something together which is very in contrast with each other. Words come from 800 years ago and the music is processed and written on electronic chips and computers. It’s like using old Persian symbols in painting or graphics. I loved how strange these two media sound together and how we can boost the meaning of words with musical elements and technology." He believed that the contradiction of a poem from 800 years ago with the twentieth century music could produce an interesting mixture of music.

Sharbaf says that they decided to provide a work which was having Iranian identity. Before beginning O-Hum, they had recorded other works, but eventually they decided to do these works so that when it is heard, everyone understands that these works are being made by an Iranian band.

== Band members ==
=== Current members ===
Member	Role	Years active	References
Shahram Sharbaf	Lead vocals, electric and acoustic guitar, synthesizer	1998–present	
Nima Ramezan	Guitar	2012–present	
Saman Vandadi	Tar, setar, kamanche, daf	2012–present	
Roozbeh Gholipour	Drums, percussion	2012–present	
Pouya Shomali	Bass	2012–present	

=== Former members ===
Member	Role	Years active	References
Shahrokh Izadkhah	Guitars, traditional instruments, synthesizer	1998–2003	
Babak Riahipour	Bass	1998–2003	
Kasra Ebrahimi	Drums		
Kasra Saboktakin	Bass		
Reza Moghadas	Keyboards		
Reza Aabaayi	Ghaychak		
Peter Akoob	Bass		
Yahya Alkhani	Drums		
Mani Safikhani	Guitar		

== Discography ==
=== Albums ===
Year	Album
1999	Nahal-e Heyrat
2001	Hafez Ashegh Ast
2005	Aloodeh
2010	E-Hum: O-Hum Remixes 1999-2009
2014	In Kherghe Biandaz
2022	Shatt-e Sharab

=== Singles ===
Title
Delbar-e Ayyar
