= Javaad Alipoor =

British-Iranian writer

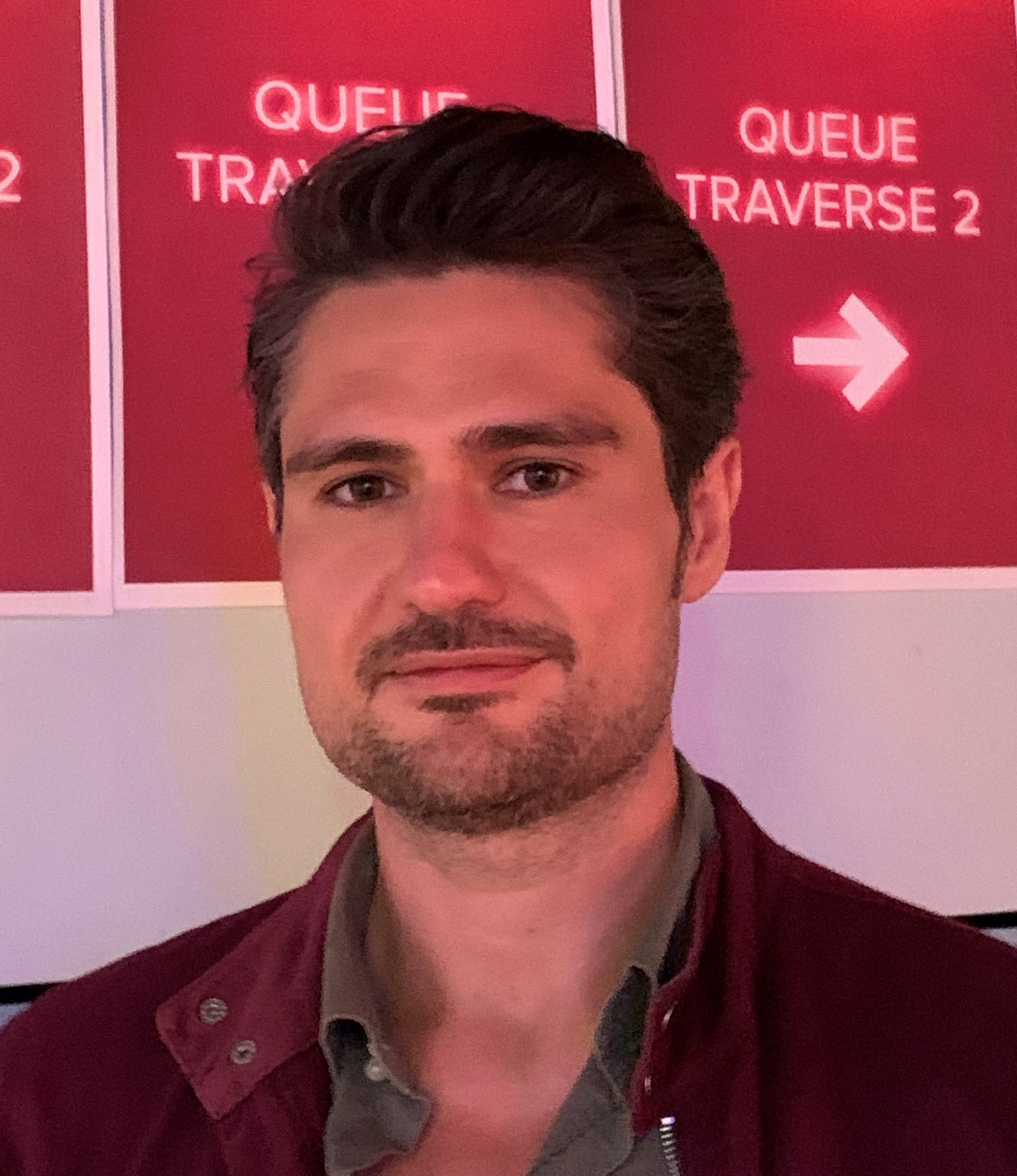
- Alipoor at The Traverse Theatre in Edinburgh 2023
- Born: September 1984 (age 41)
- Education: University of Bradford
- Years active: 2012–present
- Spouse: Natalie Diddams

Javaad Alipoor (born September 1984) is a British-Iranian theatre-maker and writer from Bradford. His work explores the interactions between technology and society, inviting audiences to engage with the kinds of technologies which shape how knowledge is created, shared and contested.

== Early life ==
Alipoor was born to an Iranian Shia Muslim father who fled the Shah regime and an English Catholic working class mother and grew up on a council estate in Bradford. Alipoor studied Regeneration Project Management at University of Bradford and is a member of University Court there. He then pursued a Masters; his thesis was about psychoanalysis and Sufism.

== Career ==
Alipoor has worked as a social worker and as resident associate director at Sheffield theatres and creative projects manager at Royal & Derngate theatre. His eponymous theatre company was established in 2017.

Alipoor has won two Scotsman Fringe First Awards (For 'Believers are But Brothers' 2017 and 'Rich Kids: A history of Shopping Malls in Tehran' 2019) and has been hosted at The Traverse Theatre during the Edinburgh Festivals

== Writing ==
'The Believers Are But Brothers' takes its title from a quote in the Qur’an and concerns online radicalisation and how young disaffected men access Islamic State propaganda sites and 4Chan.

In 'Rich Kids: A History of Shopping Malls in Tehran' Alipoor performs with Peyvand Sadeghian using YouTube and Instagram to tell stories of how Iran's young, wealthy elite live extravagant lifestyles on social media.

Alipoor's play 'Things Hidden Since the Foundation of the World' (not to be confused with Girard's Things Hidden Since the Foundation of the World') explores the story of Iranian singer Fereydoun Farrokhzad and together with Chris Thorpe, Me-Lee Hay and Raam Emami (King Raam)) comments on the way the internet shapes knowledge and research and how colonial structures are reproduced and perpetuated online, particularly in the multiple language versions of Wikipedia. Alipoor encourages his audience to browse Wikipedia and follow links down a wiki rabbit hole.

== Personal life ==
Alipoor lives in Manchester with his wife Natalie Diddams. He speaks fluent Persian. In 2018, Alipoor said he is not religious, but does take part in local Shia cultural events.
