= Niloufar Bayani =

Iranian conservationist

- نیلوفر بیانی
- Born: 1986 (age 39–40); Tehran, Iran
- Education: McGill University, Columbia University
- Occupations: conservationist, cheetah researcher
- Known for: Asian cheetah conservation, ecosystem-based disaster risk reduction and adaptation
- Awards: BBC 100 Women (2022)

Niloufar Bayani (Persian: نیلوفر بیانی; born 1986;) is an Iranian wildlife conservation biology researcher and activist. She was convicted in 2019 of espionage by Iranian authorities in a closed-door trial in Iran, and received a 10-year prison sentence.

== Early life and education ==
Niloufar Bayani was born in 1986 in Tehran, Iran. She graduated in 2009 from McGill University in Canada with a BSc degree in biology, and holds an MA degree in Conservation Biology from Columbia University.

== Career ==
After graduation, Bayani worked as a consultant and project adviser to United Nations Environment Programme (UNEP) between 2012 and 2017.

In the summer of 2017, she joined the Persian Wildlife Heritage Foundation (PWHF), an Iranian environmental organization co-founded by Kavous Seyed-Emami and other Iranian environmentalists. PWHF is a not-for-profit organization supervised by a board of trustees and an executive board whose members are well versed in conservation strategies and natural resource management. In Iran, she worked on the wildlife projects, setting camera traps in seven provinces to monitor the critically endangered Asiatic cheetah.

== Arrest and imprisonment ==
Bayani was arrested in January 2018 by the Islamic Revolutionary Guard Corps, on charges of espionage. Others arrested and imprisoned from PWHF included Seyed-Emami, Amir Hossein Khaleghi, Abdolreza Kouhpayeh, Hooman Jokar, Morad Tahabaz, Sam Rajabi, Sepideh Kashani, and Taher Ghadirian.

In 2019, Bayani wrote an open letter to Ayatollah Khamenei, describing her harsh treatment by her interrogators. On February 18, 2020, BBC Persia published letters that Bayani wrote from Evin Prison, in which she detailed the tortures she has to undergo. According to a report compiled by the BBC, she was separated and detained incommunicado for eight months and her interrogators tortured and threatened her with sexual assault. Bayani said that her interrogators showed her a photo of Seyed-Emami, whose body was found in his prison cell two days after his arrest with officials claiming he had committed suicide.

She was sentenced in 2020 without a lawyer and despite her claims. On the occasion of Iranian New Year and Eid al-Fitr, Ayatollah Khamenei has agreed to pardon or commute the sentences of 2,127 convicts upon a proposal by Iranian Judiciary Chief Gholmhossein Mohseni-Ejei. Four environmentalists – Sepideh Kashani, Niloufar Bayani, Houman Jowkar, and Taher Ghadirain – are included in the amnesty. Niloufar Bayani was released on Monday 8 April 2024, 2266 days after she was arrested, after more than 6 years in prison, and is now free with her family.

== International pressure ==
On March 14, 2019, the European Parliament adopted a resolution in which it condemned the Iranian violations to human rights, freedom of expression, fair trial, freedom of the press, freedom of thought and freedom of religion. In particular, the document makes reference to the case of Bayani and the other environmentalists in point 14; by urging the Iranian authorities to release all the individuals unfairly detained in their prisons for allegedly commission of crimes.

The United Nations' Human Rights Council, on January 28, 2020, published a Report on the situation of human rights in Iran, which expresses the concern of the Special Rapporteur regarding condition of respect of the fundamental human rights. One paragraph of the document relates to the case of the eight detained environmentalists, among which there is Bayani. She is accused of "collaborating with the United States enemy state" and has also been condemned to refund the income received as a consultant and project adviser to United Nations Environment Programme (UNEP) between 2012 and 2017. The Rapporteur invited the Iranian authorities to ensure the respect of the work pursued by the scientific community for the benefit of the Iranian country.

Scholars at Risk (SAR) is an international network of institutions and individuals that promotes academic freedom and protect scholars from academic freedom threats. SAR has been actively supporting Bayani, including by sending letters to public authorities in Iran, running advocacy seminars in universities, and conducting online activities via social networks.

== Iranian reactions ==
Following Bayani's revelation of the sexual and psychological harassment of the interrogators, the Tehran Prosecutor's Office denied the allegations, claiming that all the interrogation procedures had been videotaped, and linked the issue to accusations and planned actions on the eve of the election. It claimed that the judiciary was sensitive to the dignity of defendants, convicts, and prisoners.

The revelation of the behavior of the intelligence interrogators to Bayani was widely reported on social media. In a statement on Twitter, the Iranian reformist political activist Mostafa Tajzadeh called for the truth in Bayani's case, and for the punishment of the perpetrators of violence.

== See also ==
- Ahmad Reza Jalali
- Human rights in Iran
