= Kavous Seyed-Emami =

Canadian academic and conservationist

- Born: 24 December 1953; Tehran, Iran
- Died: 8 February 2018 (aged 64); Evin Prison, Tehran, Iran
- Resting place: Ammameh, Shemiranat, Iran
- Citizenship: Iranian, Canadian
- Criminal charge: Espionage
- Spouse: Maryam Mombeini
- Children: Ramin and Mehran
- Scientific career
- Education: Ohio University; University of Oregon
- Fields: Sociology
- Workplaces: Imam Sadiq University
- Thesis: Shi'ism and Development in Post-Revolutionary Iran (1991)
- Military career
- Allegiance: Iran
- Branch: Army
- Service years: 1980–1981
- Conflicts: Iran–Iraq War (WIA)

Kavous Seyed-Emami (Persian: کاووس سیدامامی; December 24, 1953 – February 8, 2018) was a Canadian academic and conservationist. Seyed-Emami ran the Persian Wildlife Heritage Foundation (PWHF) and was a sociology professor.

In February 2018, Iran's judiciary said that he killed himself while in detention in Evin Prison, Tehran, because of the evidence against him in a spying case. This claim, including the alleged suicide, has been rejected by his family.

Canada's Minister of Foreign Affairs Chrystia Freeland offered her condolences and stated that Canada expects "the Government of Iran to provide information and answers into the circumstances surrounding this tragedy." She welcomed the return of Seyed-Emami's sons back to Canada in March 2018 and asked the Government of Iran to lift the travel ban on Seyed-Emami's spouse, Maryam Mombeini.

== Life ==
Seyed-Emami was a Western-educated Iranian. He returned to Iran after the Iranian Revolution and fought in the war against Iraq. He was a professor of Sociology at Imam Sadiq University in Tehran and a visiting scholar at the University of Lethbridge in 2017. He was one of the founders of the Persian Wildlife Heritage Foundation (PWHF), a private non-profit organization dedicated to the conservation and preservation of wildlife in Iran.

== Arrest ==
Professor Kavous Seyed-Emami along with seven other environmentalists and fellow members of the Persian Wildlife Heritage Foundation was arrested on February 6, 2018, by the Iranian Revolutionary Guard.

== Death ==
Professor Seyed-Emami, the founder of PWHF, died under suspicious circumstances in the notorious Evin Prison in Tehran two days after his arrest.

Iran's judiciary claimed the 65-year-old professor of sociology had committed suicide because of evidence of espionage against him but his family and acquaintances and human rights defenders have always refuted the claim.

According to the New York-based Center for Human Rights in Iran (CHRI), one of the Tehran-based lawyers representing the family has revealed that the autopsy result was never made public but a preliminary state medical examiner’s report "showed evidence of an injection on his skin" as well as “bruises on different parts of the body.”

== See also ==
- List of foreign nationals detained in Iran
- Niloufar Bayani, PWHF employee also arrested
