= Abdi Behravanfar =

Iranian singer-songwriter (born 1975)

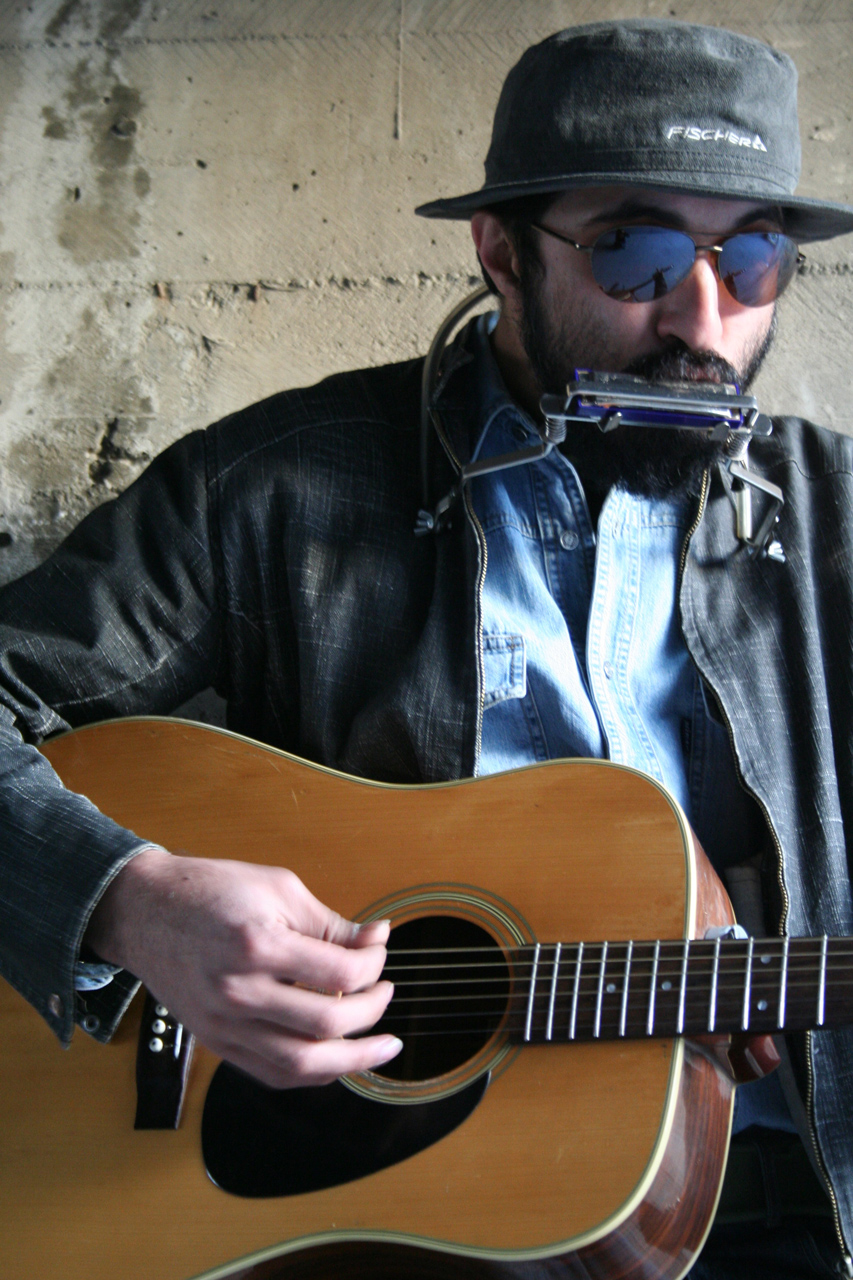

Background information
- Born: 1975 (age 50–51)
- Origin: Mashhad, Iran
- Genres: Rock, country blues, folk blues
- Occupations: Singer-songwriter, guitar player, harmonica player
- Instruments: Guitar, harmonica, Dotar
- Website: web.archive.org/web/20091102162602/http://www.abdibehravanfar.com/english/%20Abdibehravanfar.com

Abdi Behravanfar (Persian: عبدی بهروانفر; born in Mashhad, Khorasan, 1975) is an Iranian singer and songwriter. He is founder of the MUD band, based in Mashhad. He plays the guitar, harmonica and dotar (Persian folk lute). He learned guitar with Fleming Khoshghadami and dotar with Master Bakshi Almajughi.

Behravanfar has recorded nearly 40 songs, in five studio albums with the others as singles. The 2 albums, Shalamroud and Kokheo & Kalakhet were released by two production companies in the United States. The first one by Bamahang Production and the second album released by Zirzamin Production. In 2012, "White Dwarf" and in 2013 "Sorrow", were released by CD Baby. He also has performed as a film-score player for short films.

He produced and released an album by Bakhshi Almajughi in 2017; Behravanfar also produced a documentary about him showed in BBC Persian.

== Early career ==
Abdi Behravanfar was born in Mashhad, Iran. At the age of 12 while listening to "Roll On", a song created by Alabama country band, he found himself interested in playing the guitar. When he was 22 he went to Tehran and bought a guitar and started learning to play the instrument. After returning to Mashhad he formed MUD.

In 2011 he moved to London, where he has played with many blues artists. He was also a member of a British folk rock band, playing at gigs and festivals around the UK. He now play harmonica witn the blues artist Jake Zaits.

He has been influenced by musicians such as Jimi Hendrix and Jim Morrison in rock music; Son House, Muddy Waters and Sonny Boy Williamson in blues, plus Neil Young and Ian Anderson, and from Khorasani Folk.

== Discography ==
=== Studio albums ===
- Shalamroud (2008)

Track listing

1. "Faryade Feshordeh" – 4:13
2. "Agha Ghazanfar" – 5:30
3. "Toop-e-Toop" – 2:48
4. "Shalamroud" – 5:44
5. "Marde Sardo Garm Keshideh" – 5:40
6. "Kargare Bad-Bakht" – 5:48
7. "Kenare Jo" – 3:50
8. "Be Saram Zad" – 5:02
9. "Gorge Balan Rideh" – 4:09
10. "Baghe Vaba Gerefteh" – 6:10
- Kokheo & Kalakhet (2009)

Track listing

1. "Roghi" – 6:54
2. "Zadim Be Khunash" – 4:27
3. "In!?" – 5:46
4. "Pesar Amoo Joon" – 4:28
5. "Nahange Khaam" – 3:50
6. "Soog" – 4:29
7. "Gap" – 4:45
8. "Mostafa" – 5:50
- White Dwarf (2012) 19:48
- Sorrow (2013)

Track listing

1. "News" – 4:35
2. "Spring" – 4:19
3. "Alang & Dolang" – 6:32
4. "Sorrow" – 4:45
5. "Your Mood" – 5:30
6. "Atop The Mountains" – 5:20
7. "Spider" – 7:02
8. "Calm Down" – 6:10
9. "Gone Down The Alley" – 3:50
- Ejaze (2020)

Track listing

1. "Agha Ghazanfar"
2. "Shabe Man"
3. "Raftam Sare Kuche"
4. "Kargare Badbakht"
5. "Shalamroud"
6. "Marde Sardo Garm Keshide"
7. "Gorge Balan Reede"
8. "Pesar amou joon"
9. "Vagh Vaghe Sag"
10. "Jabre Zamune"
11. "Kenare Joo"
12. "Ghuze Bla Ghuz"
- Tokhm E Talaa (2021)

Track listing

1. "Roghi" (Instrumental)
2. "Alang o Dolang"
3. "Bahaar"
4. "Deladang"
5. "Kajaaye Khoshk"
6. "Gham"
7. "Lalaee"
8. "Tokhm e Talaa"
9. "Nahang e Khaam"
10. "Pesar Amoo Joun"
11. "Sar be Sar"
12. "Shaayad"
13. "Soog"
14. "Tanhaa Aamadam"
15. "Be Sahraa"
16. "Roghi"
- VEL (2023)

Track listing

1. "Mar"
2. "Basom ni"
3. "Ala Dokhtar"
4. "Sho Ayom"
5. "Do Vel"
6. "Dendoun"
7. "Gogal"
8. "Yaad"

=== Singles ===
1. "Shaayad" – 6:25
2. "Fiuz-e- sukhteh" – 5:26
3. "Esfandiar-e Maghmoum" – 9:35
4. "Gap" – 4:44
5. "lalayee" – 6:26
6. "Ejazeh" – 3:45
7. "Dela Dangom"
