= Habib (singer) =

Iranian singer and musician

Habib حبیب محبیان
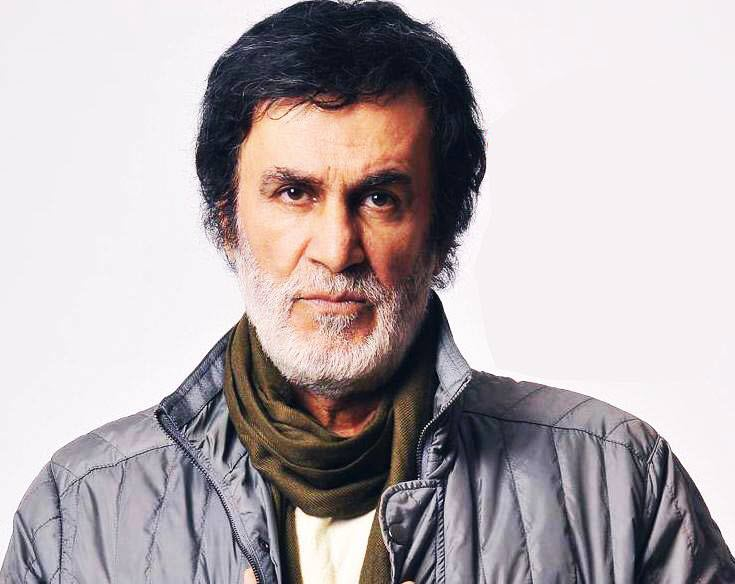

Background information
- Born: Habib Mohebian; 27 September 1947; Tehran, Iran
- Died: 10 June 2016 (aged 68) Ramsar, Mazandaran, Iran
- Genres: Persian rock, rock, pop, country
- Occupations: Singer, composer, musician
- Instruments: Guitar, piano
- Years active: 1975–2016
- Labels: Taraneh Records, Avang Music, Caltex Records
- Website: Official website

Habib Mohebian (Persian: حبیب محبیان; 26 September 1947 – 10 June 2016), better known by his stage name Habib, was an Iranian singer, songwriter, musician, composer and arranger. He is considered one of the founders of Iranian rock music. He was one of the few Iranian singers who had composed all his works and he was one of the few Iranian singers who used a twelve-string guitar in his performances and was a professional musician of this instrument.

== Early life ==
Habib was born on 27 September 1947 in Shemiran, Tehran province. His interest was in the guitar from the beginning. Habib's adolescence coincided with the appearance of the Beatles in the 70s of Europe, and this made him more interested in music. After being accepted in the radio and television exam, he started learning the principles and measures of composition under the supervision of Morteza Hannaneh. Later, he was able to be employed as a singer on television. After 2 years of employment in radio and television, he went to military service, and there he was also a singer of the officers' club.

== Career ==
=== Before the revolution ===
He released the hit album "Mard-e Tanha-ye Shab" in 1977 which led to his fame. The most famous song of this album is of the same name. Another famous song of the album is "Shahlaye Man". He also released his second album called "Salam Hamsayeh" in 1978.

=== Immigration to America ===
After the Iranian Revolution, Habib left Iran in 1983 due to the ban on his singing in Iran and settled in Los Angeles in the United States of America in 1985. He reached his prime again with "Bezan Baran" (1996) album. After that, he released another successful album called "Kavir-e Bavar" (1999), which included the famous song of "Kharchanghaye Mordabi".

=== Collaboration with Mohammad ===
In 2002, Habib went on stage with his son Mohammad. While staying true to his principles, Habib has shown a bit more flexibility in producing music videos, performing on stage and more mainstream music to help his son's career. Their first joint album was called "Javuni".

=== Return to Iran ===
Habib travelled back to Iran in 2009 and requested the government to release the album and perform the concert. But they didn't allow this, and after returning to Iran, he released only a few singles and music videos.

== Personal life ==
His first wife was called Shadi. They had a son, Ahmadreza. After Shadi's death, Habib married Nahid. They had a son, Mohammad.

== Death ==
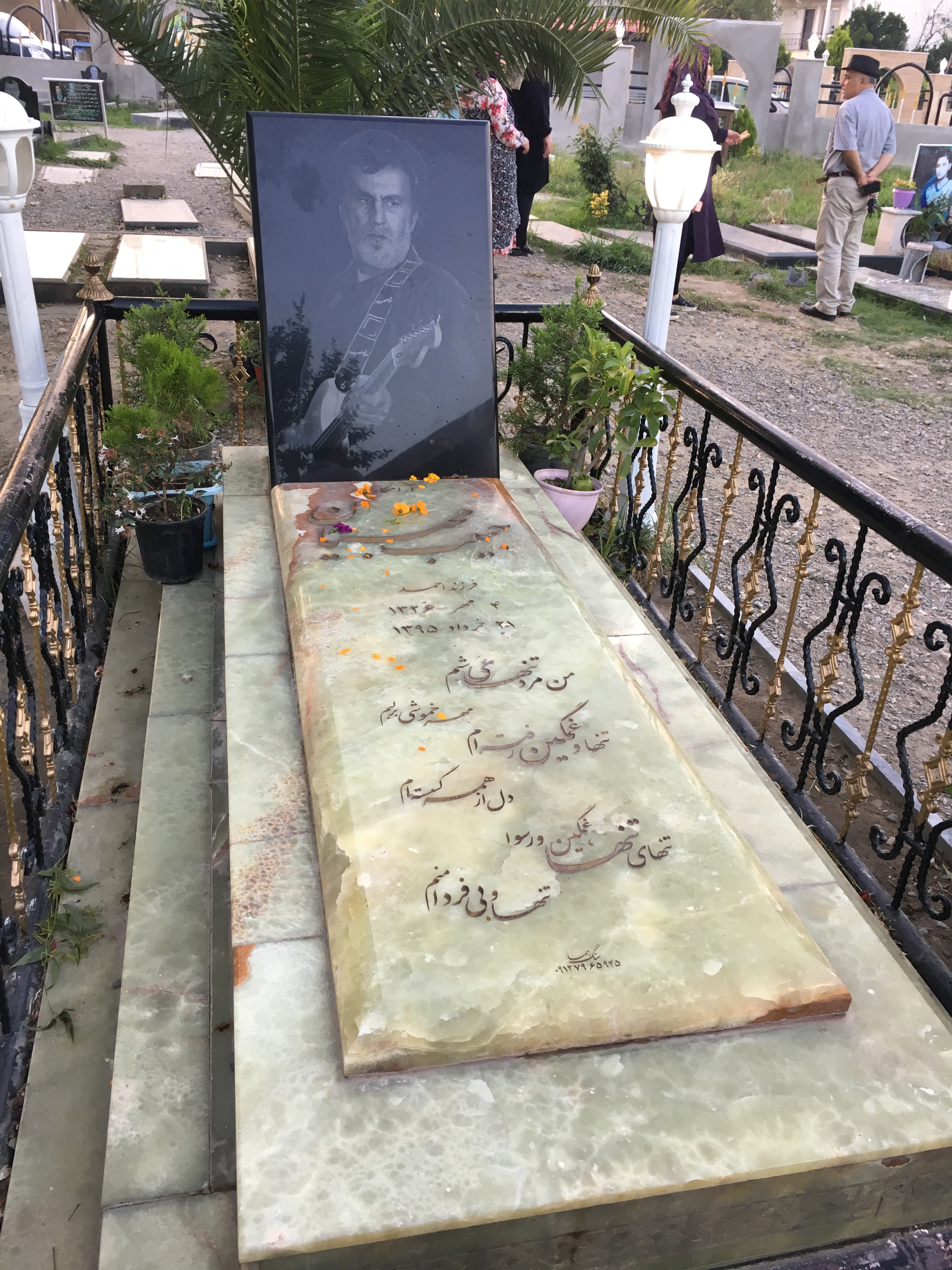
Habib's grave in Ketalem and Sadat Shahr

He died at 9 o'clock in the morning on Friday, June 10, 2016, at the age of 68 due to cardiac arrest in Niasteh village, Katalem, Ramsar.

== Discography ==
=== Albums ===
- (1977) Mard-e Tanha-ye Shab
- (1978) Salaame Hamsayeh
- (1984) Aftab Mahtab
- (1988) Hamraz
- (1990) Khorshid Khanoom
- (1992) Akheh Azizam Chi Misheh?
- (1994) Sefr
- (1996) Bezan Baran
- (1999) Kavir-e Bavar
- (2001) Khodavanda
- (2002) Khane-ye Koochak
- (2004) Javuni
- (2006) Khodeshe (Feat Mohammad)
- (2008) Iran Banoo

=== Singles ===
- (2010) Shooneh Be Shooneh (Feat Ivan)
- (2010) Eshgh Khodaei
- (2012) Baran
- (2012) Abo Khaak
- (2012) Sara
- (2012) Mahkoom (Feat Samir Zand)
- (2013) To Naboodi
- (2014) Bebar ey barf
- (2014) God is great
- (2014) Naz gole baba
- (2014) Banooye sharghi
- (2015) Donya
- (2016) Goleh sorkh
- (2016) Mohkoom 2
- (2016) Donya (Remix)
- (2017) To Hosseini
- (2018) Yade Geryehat (Feat Mohamad)
