= Zendoone Del =

Studio album by Fereydoon Forooghi
- Released: February 1, 1972
- Venue: Tehran
- Genre: Folk; funk; psychedelic rock
- Length: 57:23
- Label: Taraneh Records

Fereydoon Forooghi chronology
Doe Taa Chesm Seyah Dari (1972)	Zendoone Del (1972)	Sale Ghahti (1977)

Zendoone Del (Persian: زندونِ دل; Heart's Prison) is the debut album by Iranian singer-songwriter Fereydoon Forooghi. It was released in 1972 as an unofficial album by Taraneh Records in Iran and includes 13 tracks. After released filmscores for Adamak, he resumed his activities in the field of film and theater music. This time, he sang a song by Farshid Ramzi, which resulted in pieces such as "Zendoone Del" and "Ghame Tanhaei".

== Release ==
The album was released as an LP record with the sides containing six and seven songs, respectively. Before the album was released, the single "Zendoone Del" was sold as a 7-inch 45-rpm record, with "تم زندون دل" on the B-side by Juliet and manufactured by Royal. The album was re-released in 1992 by Taraneh Records.

== Track listing ==
Side A
No.	Title	Length
1.	"Gereftar" (Arrested)	4:44
2.	"Havaye Tazeh"	3:27
3.	"Khak"	6:16
4.	"Ghasedak"	4:50
5.	"Ghoozake Pa"	4:00
6.	"Tangna"	4:51

Side B
No.	Title	Lyrics	Music	Length
7.	"Niaz" (Need)	Shahyar Ghanbari	Monfardzadeh	4:19
8.	"Mahie Khasteye Man"			4:22
9.	"Zendoone Del" (Heart's Prison)	William Khenno	Khenno	4:12
10.	"Ghame Tanhaei"			4:46
11.	"Divaneye Man"			3:02
12.	"Adamak"			4:09
13.	"Hamisheh Ghayeb" (Always Absent)	Shahyar Ghanbari	Khenno	4:17

== Personnel ==
- Manouchehr Cheshmazar – piano
