= Yaran =

Yaran ياران
- Village
- Location within Iran
- Coordinates: 34°31′19″N 45°58′01″E
- Country: Iran
- Province: Kermanshah
- County: Dalahu
- Bakhsh: Central
- Rural District: Ban Zardeh

Population (2006)
  - Total: 191
- Time zone: UTC+3:30 (IRST)
  - Summer (DST): UTC+4:30 (IRDT)

Yaran (Persian: ياران, also Romanized as Yārān) is a village in Ban Zardeh Rural District, in the Central District of Dalahu County, Kermanshah Province, Iran. At the 2006 census, its population was 191, in 35 families.
