= Hypernova (band) =

New York-based Iranian rock band

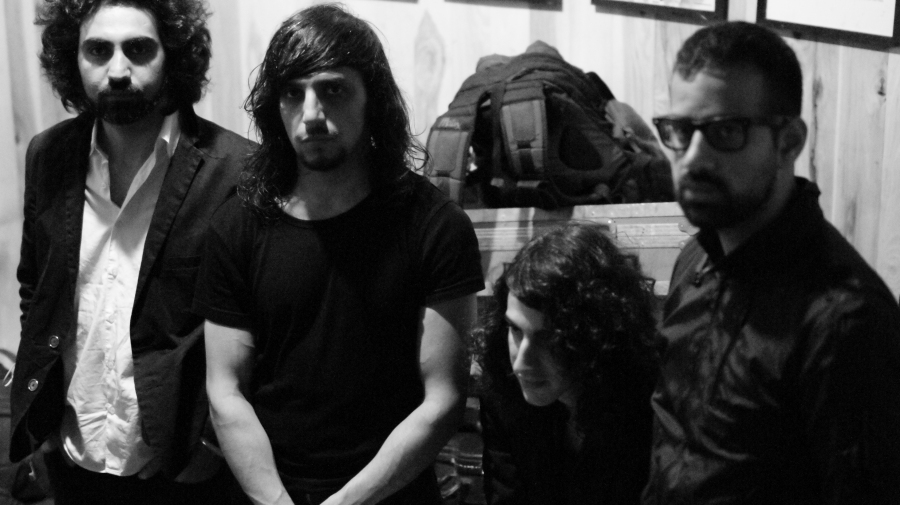
- From left to right: Jam, Kami, Kodi Najm, King Raam

Background information
- Origin: Tehran, Iran
- Genres: Post-punk revival, indie rock
- Years active: 2006–present
- Label: Narnack
- Members: King Raam; Kami; Kodi Najm; Jam

Hypernova is a New York–based Iranian rock band from Tehran. The band is made up of King Raam, Kami, Kodi Najm and Jam. Raam is the lead vocalist, Kodi is the lead guitarist, Kami is the drummer and Jam plays bass. Hypernova also has session musicians playing synths and keys at their live shows. The band members' individual names are derivations of their actual first names, probably to avoid undue attention at home in Tehran, where playing rock music is dubbed as illegal and may lead to arrest, large fines, and even a public flogging.

== Discography ==
=== Through the Chaos (2010) ===
Through the Chaos is Hypernova's debut album and was released April 6, 2010 on Narnack Records. The album is produced by Herwig Maurer and mixed/engineered by Sean Beavan. The album was recorded, mixed and mastered in 2008 but the official release was pushed back to 2010. During this time a few limited edition copies were given out by the band to fans.

1. "Universal"
2. "Viva La Resistance"
3. "Lost In Space"
4. "American Dream"
5. "Empty Times"
6. "Here And Now"
7. "With You"
8. "Fairy Tales"
9. "Monster In Me"
10. "See The Future"

=== Exit Strategy / Live EP (2011) ===
Exit Strategy is Hypernova's latest release. The EP was recorded live at "Machines With Magnets studios". Exit Strategy consists of 4 tracks. The track-listing is as follows:

1. "Children of Gemini"
2. "Extacy"
3. "Prevail"
4. "Reasons Unknown"

== Rock Band 3 ==
In October 2010, it was announced that the song "Viva La Resistance" from Hypernova's debut album Through the Chaos would be featured on the main setlist of the video game Rock Band 3. "Viva La Resistance" was also the first song from the 2010s to be included on a Rock Band disc.

== 2008–2009 U.S.A. tour ==
The band were only issued visas after Senator Charles Schumer faxed a letter to the U.S. embassy in Dubai.
