= Qurqurak =

Qurqurak قورقورك
- Village
- Location within Iran
- Coordinates: 35°39′39″N 50°09′15″E
- Country: Iran
- Province: Qazvin
- County: Buin Zahra
- Bakhsh: Central
- Rural District: Zahray-ye Pain

Population (2006)
  - Total: 14
- Time zone: UTC+3:30 (IRST)
  - Summer (DST): UTC+4:30 (IRDT)

Qurqurak (Persian: قورقورك, also Romanized as Qūrqūrak and Qorqūrīk) is a village in Zahray-ye Pain Rural District, in the Central District of Buin Zahra County, Qazvin Province, Iran. At the 2006 census, its population was 14, in 7 families.
