= Kodi Najm =

- Born: 29 July 1989 (age 37); Tehran, Iran
- Genres: Post-punk revival, techno, soundtracks
- Instruments: Guitar, piano, bass guitar
- Years active: 2005–present
- Labels: Narnack records, Correspondant Records
- Website: http://www.kodinajm.com

Kodi Najm (born 29 July 1989) is an Iranian-American musician, composer and producer. He is best known for his film compositions and soundtrack work. Najm was the lead guitar player for the rock band Hypernova in the early 2000s.

== Early life and musical career ==
Kodi Najm was born in Tehran, Iran. He left Iran when he was 17 years old and moved to the New York City where he currently resides. He has written and released an EP and one full-length album as a member of Hypernova. Najm has also recorded and composed a heavily electronic and orchestral concept album for the motion picture Koyakatsi in early 2013.

== Solo work ==
Correspondant Compilation 07 - 'E.V.B.T (East Village Bass tool)' with Krystal Klear

== Filmography ==
- Chiaroscuro Cinematography by Greig Fraser (2025) - Executive Producer
- Until We Meet Again (2020)
- Vortex (Short) (2019)
- Ziona (Documentary) (2017)
- Thirty-Six Hours (short) (2016)
- Koyakatsi OST - Koyakatsi (Motion picture by Ayoub Qanir)
- Vex (short) (2014)
- Room 237 (short) (2012)

== Band discography ==
- Hypernova - Fairy Tales (2009)
- Hypernova - Through the Chaos (2010)
- Hypernova - Exit Strategy (2011)
